= United States Post Office (Provincetown, Massachusetts) =

- U.S. Post Office-Provincetown Main
- U.S. National Register of Historic Places
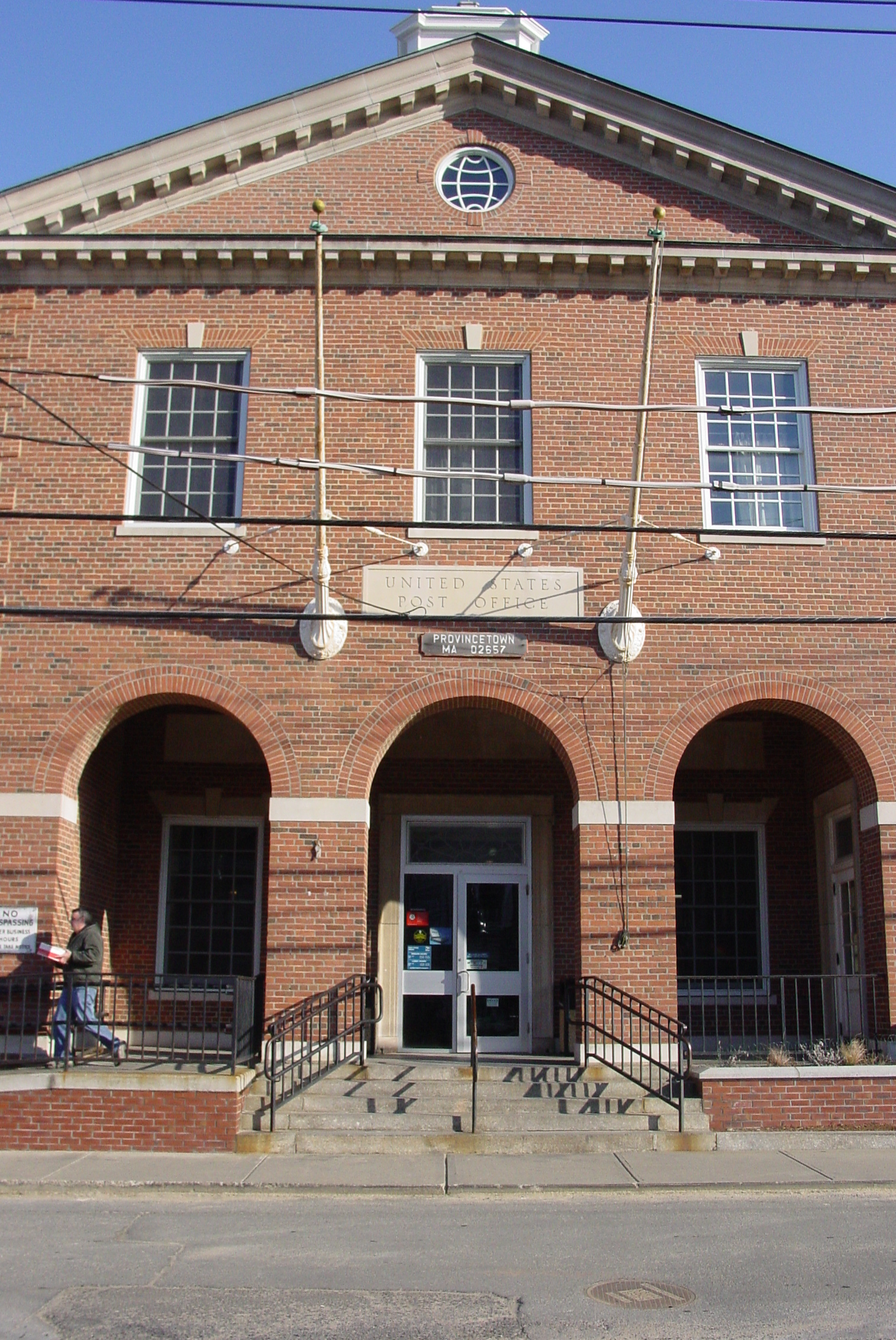
- United States Post Office in Provincetown
- Location: 217 Commercial St; Provincetown, Massachusetts
- Coordinates: 42°2′57″N 70°11′20″W
- Built: 1930
- Architect: J.A. Wetmore
- Architectural style: Georgian
- NRHP reference No.: 87001772
- Added to NRHP: October 19, 1987

The Provincetown Post Office is located at 217 Commercial Street in Provincetown, Massachusetts. It is located in a 2 1/2-story brick building that was built in 1930. The main facade has a loggia-style arcade of three arches on the first level, leading to a recessed entrance. The second story has three large windows across, and the gable end has an oculus window and dentil moulding. The building is crowned by a cupola.

The building was listed on the National Register of Historic Places in 1987.

left side facing building	right side

== See also ==
- National Register of Historic Places listings in Barnstable County, Massachusetts
- List of United States post offices
