= Old North Cemetery (Truro, Massachusetts) =

Historic cemetery in Barnstable County, Massachusetts

- U.S. National Register of Historic Places
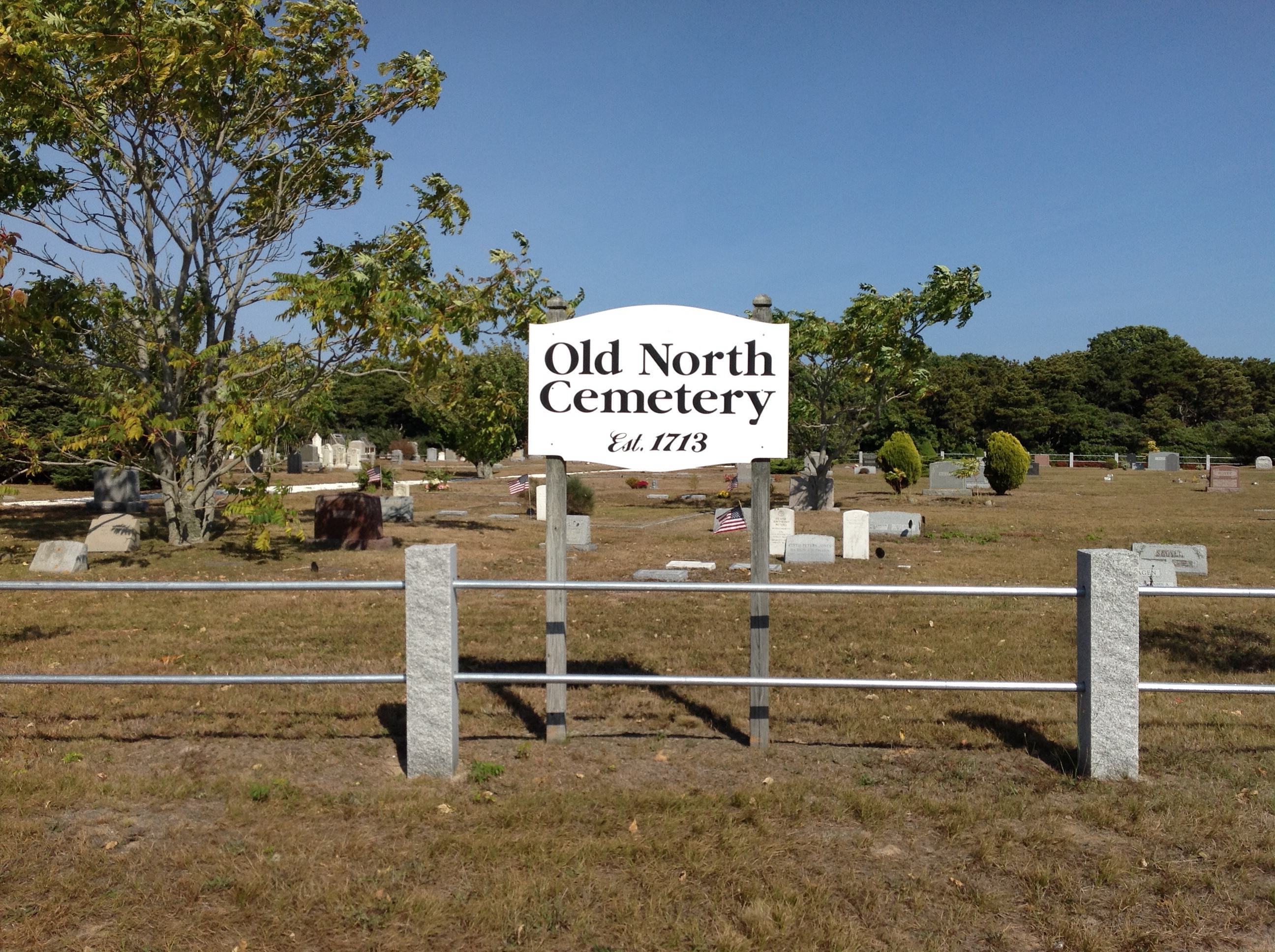

- Location within Cape Cod Location within Massachusetts Location within the United States
- Location: Truro, Massachusetts
- Coordinates: 42°01′26″N 70°04′24″W
- NRHP reference No.: 13000095
- Added to NRHP: March 20, 2013

The Old North Cemetery is the oldest cemetery in Truro, Massachusetts. The cemetery, formerly the Old North Graveyard, was established in 1713 on the Hill of Storms where the first church in Truro was built in 1709. It remained the town's only cemetery until 1799 when the Pine Grove Cemetery was established. Old North is on US Route 6 between Aldrich Road and South Highland Road. Many individuals associated with Truro's early development are buried here, as are ship's captains. When originally laid out, the cemetery was about 3 acres (1.2 ha) in size; it was expanded in 1926 and again in 1974 and is now 5.8 acres. The oldest part of the cemetery is its northernmost section, abutting Aldrich Road. As of 2022 there are approximately 1,670 burials in the cemetery. Over half of those buried in the original "Old Stone" (north) section were less than 50 years old when they died.

The cemetery was added to the National Register of Historic Places in 2013.

== History ==
The first church in Truro was built prior to 1709 as it was a requirement for incorporation of a town. Experts differ on the site, but the consensus is that the second building erected in 1720 was at the site of the first building. Some unmarked graves were found near the site of the present Christian Union Church. These are thought to be of people who died prior to 1713 or who were buried apart from the community due to pestilence or a family wish for separation. The replacement church building was called "The First Church of Christ in Truro" and the site was named the "Hill of Storms" being exposed to winds from all directions.

At a meeting on May 22, 1713, the town voted that the selectmen should take care to have a convenient piece of ground cleared on the north side of the meeting-house in Truro, for a burying place, and the charge be paid out of the Town Treasury. When the new church was built in Truro center a new graveyard was established in the churchyard and the old cemetery remained in the ownership of the town. The cemetery is on the Massachusetts Historical Commission record and the National Register of Historic Places.

== Grave markers ==
As the oldest cemetery in Truro it has the largest number of 18th century grave markers in the town. There are a large number of the round shouldered slate stones dating to the 18th century. The earliest grave is 1713 where Hannah Paine aged 52 is buried. The 18th century stones have typical motifs of the period, skulls with wings, sunsets, hourglasses, etc. The next important group of markers are the marble slabs dating from the mid and late 19th century. These come in many shapes, but round topped and pointed topped are the most common. The burial ground has a large number of 20th and 21st century slabs. Residents of the town continue to be buried in the cemetery today.

== Truro Cemetery Commission ==
The cemetery is overseen by an elected board of three town residents whose powers and duties are to care for and manage all public burial grounds in town. Caring for the cemeteries includes maintenance of grounds, trees, roads, fences, mausoleums, and burial memorials. Management includes record-keeping, selling burial plots to residents, issuing deeds, staking plots and arranging the installation of permanent plot markers, and, when there is a death, issuing burial permits which are free but required for burial in a town cemetery.

== See also ==
- National Register of Historic Places listings in Barnstable County, Massachusetts
