= National Register of Historic Places listings in Barnstable County, Massachusetts =

Location of Barnstable County in Massachusetts

This is a list of the National Register of Historic Places listings in Barnstable County, Massachusetts.

This is intended to be a complete list of the properties and districts on the National Register of Historic Places in Barnstable County, Massachusetts, United States. Latitude and longitude coordinates are provided for many National Register properties and districts; these locations may be seen together in a map.

There are 207 properties and districts listed on the National Register in the county, including 3 National Historic Landmarks. Those in the town of Barnstable may be found at National Register of Historic Places listings in Barnstable, Massachusetts. Four listings appear in more than one of these lists because the boundaries cross geographic borders.

Contents: Counties in Massachusetts

Barnstable | Berkshire | Bristol | Dukes | Essex | Franklin | Hampden | Hampshire | Middlesex | Nantucket | Norfolk | Plymouth | Suffolk | Worcester

This National Park Service list is complete through NPS recent listings posted June 26, 2026.

== Current listings ==
=== Remainder of county ===
	Name on the Register	Image	Date listed	Location	City or town	Description
1	Ahearn House and Summer House	Ahearn House and Summer House	November 21, 1984 (#84000575)	Pamet Point Rd. 41°57′33″N 70°02′42″W	Wellfleet	
2	Aptucxet Trading Post Museum Historic District	Aptucxet Trading Post Museum Historic District	March 25, 2021 (#100006301)	6 Aptucxet Rd. 41°44′31″N 70°36′18″W	Bourne	Reconstruction of early colonial trading post inspired by Colonial Revival movement
3	Atwood–Higgins Historic District	Atwood–Higgins Historic District	July 30, 1976 (#76000154)	Bound Brook Island Rd. 41°57′12″N 70°03′26″W	Wellfleet	Originally listed as just the Atwood House, it was expanded to a historic district in 2010.
4	Avant House	Avant House	December 3, 1998 (#98001382)	MA 130 at Mill Pond; 41°38′57″N 70°29′12″W	Mashpee	
5	Baxter Mill	Baxter Mill	August 27, 1981 (#81000120)	MA 28; 41°39′38″N 70°15′42″W	West Yarmouth	
6	The Beacon	The Beacon	June 15, 1987 (#87001527)	Off Cable Rd. 41°50′42″N 69°57′36″W	Eastham	The longest-used of the Three Sisters of Nauset. The other two are listed separately (see Three Sisters of Nauset (Twin Lights) below); the three decommissioned lighthouses have since been reunited.
7	Captain James Berry House	Captain James Berry House	September 26, 1986 (#86001837)	37 Main St. 41°40′09″N 70°07′08″W	West Harwich	
8	Bourne High School	Bourne High School	February 27, 2013 (#13000035)	85 Cotuit Rd. 41°44′31″N 70°35′41″W	Bourne	This is the former Bourne High School building, which was afterward the Kempton J. Coady Junior High School.
9	Jonathan Bourne Public Library	Jonathan Bourne Public Library	January 14, 2013 (#12001168)	30 Keene St. 41°44′37″N 70°35′49″W	Bourne	The building listed on the National Register now houses the Jonathan Bourne Historical Center. The current Jonathan Bourne Public Library is located at 19 Sandwich Rd. in a former elementary school.
10	Bourne Town Hall	Bourne Town Hall	January 14, 2013 (#12001169)	24 Perry Ave. 41°44′53″N 70°36′06″W	Bourne	
11	Bournedale Village School	Bournedale Village School	February 27, 2013 (#13000037)	29 Herring Pond Rd. 41°46′30″N 70°33′42″W	Bourne	
12	Louis Brandeis House	Louis Brandeis House	November 28, 1972 (#72000148)	Neck Lane, off Cedar St., 8 miles (13 km) southwest of Stage Harbor Rd. intersection 41°40′23″N 69°59′00″W	Chatham	Summer home of Justice Louis Brandeis
13	Thomas Bray Farm	Thomas Bray Farm	September 15, 1988 (#88001455)	280 Weir Rd. 41°42′04″N 70°12′29″W	Yarmouth	
14	Marcel Breuer House and Studio		July 29, 2024 (#100010568)	634 Black Pond Road; 41°57′53″N 70°00′35″W	Wellfleet	
15	Brewster Old King's Highway Historic District	Brewster Old King's Highway Historic District	February 23, 1996 (#96000162)	Roughly MA 6A from east of Paines Creek Rd. to Bittersweet Dr. and parts of Briar and Lower Rds. 41°45′31″N 70°05′13″W	Brewster	
16	Brick Block	Brick Block	April 13, 1979 (#79000323)	Main St. and Chatham Bars Rd. 41°40′46″N 69°57′24″W	Chatham	
17	Bridge Road Cemetery	Bridge Road Cemetery	May 27, 1999 (#99000636)	Bridge Rd. 41°49′33″N 69°58′53″W	Eastham	
18	George I. Briggs House	George I. Briggs House	September 10, 1981 (#81000119)	Sandwich Rd. 41°44′31″N 70°35′51″W	Bourne	1830s Greek Revival house; blacksmith on property shod Grover Cleveland's horses in 1880s.
19	Cataumet Schoolhouse	Cataumet Schoolhouse	August 15, 2019 (#100004268)	1200 County Rd. 41°40′13″N 70°36′27″W	Bourne	
20	Center Methodist Church	Center Methodist Church	October 31, 1975 (#75000247)	356 Commercial St. 42°03′12″N 70°11′04″W	Provincetown	Center Methodist Episcopal Church was built in 1860 as the largest Methodist church in the world. The church was later the Chrysler Museum of Art. It is currently the home of the Provincetown Public Library.
21	Central Fire Station	Central Fire Station	February 26, 1998 (#98000146)	399 Main St. 41°33′06″N 70°36′28″W	Falmouth	
22	Chase Library		December 29, 2014 (#14001094)	7 Main St. 41°40′08″N 70°07′17″W	West Harwich	
23	Chatham Light Station	Chatham Light Station	June 15, 1987 (#87001501)	Main St. 41°40′17″N 69°57′01″W	Chatham	
24	Chatham Railroad Depot	Chatham Railroad Depot	November 27, 1978 (#78000422)	153 Depot Rd. 41°41′08″N 69°57′44″W	Chatham	
25	Chatham Windmill	Chatham Windmill	November 30, 1978 (#78000421)	Chase Park, Shattuck Pl. 41°40′34″N 69°57′33″W	Chatham	
26	Cleveland Ledge Light Station	Cleveland Ledge Light Station	June 15, 1987 (#87001462)	Cape Cod Canal; 41°37′49″N 70°41′55″W	Falmouth	
27	Coast Guard Motor Lifeboat CG 36500	Coast Guard Motor Lifeboat CG 36500	May 27, 2005 (#05000467)	Berthed at Rock Harbor; 41°47′58″N 70°00′32″W	Orleans	
28	Cobb Memorial Library	Cobb Memorial Library	June 12, 2013 (#13000367)	13 Truro Center Rd. 41°59′41″N 70°03′03″W	Truro	
29	Collins Cottages Historic District	Collins Cottages Historic District	May 20, 1999 (#99000528)	150 MA 6; 41°47′58″N 69°58′55″W	Eastham	
30	Cove Burying Ground	Cove Burying Ground	May 12, 1999 (#99000561)	Junction of MA 6 and Pine Woods Rd. 41°48′40″N 69°58′17″W	Eastham	
31	Crowell–Bourne Farm	Crowell–Bourne Farm	April 23, 1980 (#80000501)	W. Falmouth Highway; 41°37′04″N 70°37′34″W	West Falmouth	
32	Dennis Village Cemetery	Dennis Village Cemetery	June 8, 2005 (#05000558)	MA 6A and Old Bass River Rd. 41°44′11″N 70°11′33″W	Dennis	
33	Josiah Dennis House	Josiah Dennis House	February 15, 1974 (#74000360)	16 Whig St. 41°44′25″N 70°11′58″W	Dennis	
34	Dillingham House	Dillingham House	April 30, 1976 (#76000225)	West of Brewster off MA 6A; 41°44′57″N 70°07′31″W	Brewster	
35	Dune Shacks of Peaked Hill Bars Historic District	Dune Shacks of Peaked Hill Bars Historic District	March 15, 2012 (#12000132)	Inner Dune, Snail, & High Head Rds. 42°04′21″N 70°09′48″W	Provincetown	
36	Eastham Center Historic District	Eastham Center Historic District	May 12, 1999 (#99000560)	Depot, Mill, and Samoset Rds., and U.S. Route 6; 41°49′40″N 69°58′24″W	Eastham	
37	Eldredge Public Library	Eldredge Public Library	April 28, 1992 (#92000430)	564 Main St. 41°40′52″N 69°57′32″W	Chatham	
38	Falmouth Pumping Station	Falmouth Pumping Station	February 26, 1998 (#98000148)	Pumping Station Rd. 41°34′15″N 70°36′57″W	Falmouth	
39	Falmouth Village Green Historic District	Falmouth Village Green Historic District	March 27, 1996 (#96000271)	Roughly along Locust, Main, N. Main and Hewins Sts.and Palmer Ave., including also the Old Town Cemetery; 41°33′06″N 70°37′22″W	Falmouth	
40	First Congregational Parish Historic District	First Congregational Parish Historic District	May 19, 2014 (#14000214)	3 First Parish Ln., 26 Bridge Rd. 41°59′54″N 70°03′16″W	Truro	
41	First Universalist Church	First Universalist Church	February 23, 1972 (#72000122)	236 Commercial St. 42°03′02″N 70°11′18″W	Provincetown	
42	Forestdale School	Forestdale School	June 6, 1997 (#97000469)	87 Falmouth-Sandwich Rd. 41°41′15″N 70°30′16″W	Sandwich	
43	Fort Hill Rural Historic District	Fort Hill Rural Historic District	April 5, 2001 (#00001656)	Fort Hill Rd, Cape Cod National Seashore; 41°49′10″N 69°57′56″W	Eastham	
44	French Cable Hut	French Cable Hut	April 22, 1976 (#76000153)	East of North Eastham at the junction of Cable Rd.and Ocean View Dr. 41°51′34″N 69°57′07″W	North Eastham	
45	French Cable Station	French Cable Station	April 11, 1972 (#72000121)	Southeastern corner of Cove Rd.and MA 28; 41°47′16″N 69°59′16″W	Orleans	
46	Half Way House	Half Way House	July 21, 1978 (#78000423)	Forest Beach Road; 41°40′09″N 70°01′36″W	Chatham	
47	Harwich Historic District	Harwich Historic District	February 24, 1975 (#75000245)	Irregular pattern on both sides of Main St., west to Forest St.and east to the junction of Rte. 39 and Chatham Rd. 41°41′09″N 70°04′16″W	Harwich Center	
48	Harwich Port Library		May 11, 2026 (#100012996)	49 Bank Street; 41°40′02″N 70°04′19″W	Harwich	
49	Ruth and Robert Hatch Jr. House	Ruth and Robert Hatch Jr. House	February 25, 2014 (#14000018)	309 Bound Brook Way; 41°57′21″N 70°04′29″W	Wellfleet	Mid 20th Century Modern Residential Architecture on Outer Cape Cod MPS
50	Hawthorne Class Studio		July 21, 1978 (#78000434)	Off Miller Hill Rd. 42°03′27″N 70°10′58″W	Provincetown	
51	Jedediah Higgins House	Jedediah Higgins House	November 21, 1984 (#84000550)	Higgins Hollow Rd. 42°00′35″N 70°03′06″W	North Truro	
52	Highland House	Highland House	June 5, 1975 (#75000157)	Off U.S. Route 6 on Cape Cod National Seashore; 42°02′25″N 70°03′56″W	Truro	
53	Highland Light Station	Highland Light Station	June 15, 1987 (#87001463)	Off U.S. Route 6; 42°02′48″N 70°04′10″W	Truro	
54	Hinckley's Corner Historic District	Hinckley's Corner Historic District	May 29, 1998 (#98000595)	0, 25, and 40 Way #112; 41°55′02″N 70°00′14″W	Wellfleet	
55	John and Mary Waterman Jarves House	John and Mary Waterman Jarves House	August 30, 2002 (#02000903)	3 Jarves St. 41°45′30″N 70°29′46″W	Sandwich	
56	Jarvesville Historic District	Jarvesville Historic District	September 23, 2010 (#10000787)	Roughly bounded by Liberty, Main, Jarves, and Church Sts., and the town landing 41°45′32″N 70°29′38″W	Sandwich	
57	Mercelia Evelyn Eldridge Kelley House	Mercelia Evelyn Eldridge Kelley House	February 24, 2005 (#05000080)	2610 Main St. 41°40′44″N 70°01′35″W	Chatham	
58	Peter Kugel House	Peter Kugel House	February 25, 2014 (#14000019)	188 Long Pond Rd. 41°56′40″N 69°59′53″W	Wellfleet	Mid 20th Century Modern Residential Architecture on Outer Cape Cod MPS
59	Samuel and Minette Kuhn House	Samuel and Minette Kuhn House	February 25, 2014 (#14000020)	420 Griffins Island Rd. 41°56′45″N 70°04′06″W	Wellfleet	Mid 20th Century Modern Residential Architecture on Outer Cape Cod MPS
60	Lawrence Academy	Lawrence Academy	February 20, 1998 (#98000123)	20 Academy Ln. 41°33′09″N 70°36′57″W	Falmouth	
61	Long Point Light Station	Long Point Light Station	September 28, 1987 (#87002039)	Long Point; 42°01′59″N 70°10′07″W	Provincetown	
62	Marconi Wireless Station Site	Marconi Wireless Station Site	May 2, 1975 (#75000158)	1 mile (1.6 km) northeast of Cape Cod National Seashore; 41°54′50″N 69°58′20″W	South Wellfleet	
63	Marconi–RCA Wireless Receiving Station	Marconi–RCA Wireless Receiving Station	August 30, 1994 (#94000996)	Junction of Old Comers Rd.and Orleans Rd. 41°42′12″N 69°58′47″W	Chatham	
64	Monomoy Point Lighthouse	Monomoy Point Lighthouse	November 1, 1979 (#79000324)	Monomoy Island; 41°33′33″N 69°59′39″W	Chatham	
65	Nauset Archeological District	Nauset Archeological District	April 19, 1993 (#93000607)	Fort Hill Road area 41°49′08″N 69°57′46″W	Eastham	
66	Nauset Beach Light	Nauset Beach Light	June 15, 1987 (#87001484)	Nauset Beach; 41°51′15″N 69°57′06″W	Eastham	
67	John Newcomb House	John Newcomb House	September 15, 1988 (#88001457)	near Williams Pond; 41°57′53″N 70°00′23″W	Wellfleet	Also known as Henry David Thoreau's "House of the Wellfleet Oysterman".
68	Nickerson Mansion	Nickerson Mansion	February 20, 1986 (#86000300)	2871 Main St. 41°46′22″N 70°03′10″W	Brewster	
69	Nobska Point Light Station	Nobska Point Light Station	June 15, 1987 (#87001483)	Nobska Rd. 41°30′59″N 70°39′27″W	Falmouth	
70	North Falmouth Village Historic District	North Falmouth Village Historic District	February 20, 1998 (#98000121)	85–408 Old Main Rd., and 6 Wild Harbor Rd. 41°38′47″N 70°37′02″W	Falmouth	
71	Northside Historic District	Northside Historic District	November 24, 1987 (#87001777)	U.S. Route 6A between the Barnstable–Yarmouth town line and White Brock; 41°42′10″N 70°14′45″W	Yarmouth	
72	Benjamin Nye Homestead	Benjamin Nye Homestead	January 6, 1992 (#91001899)	85 Old County Rd. 41°43′43″N 70°25′55″W	Sandwich	Now a historic house museum
73	Elnathan Nye House	Elnathan Nye House	June 27, 2002 (#02000697)	33 Old Main Rd. 41°38′08″N 70°37′11″W	Falmouth	
74	Oak Grove Cemetery	Oak Grove Cemetery	September 10, 2014 (#14000560)	46 Jones Rd. 41°33′50″N 70°36′59″W	Falmouth	
75	Old Harbor U.S. Life Saving Station	Old Harbor U.S. Life Saving Station	August 18, 1975 (#75000159)	Race Point Road; 42°04′48″N 70°12′59″W	Provincetown	Listed as being northeast of Chatham on Nauset Beach; moved in 1977.
76	Old Higgins Farm Windmill	Old Higgins Farm Windmill	June 10, 1975 (#75000240)	Off Old King's Highway, 51 Drummer Boy Rd. 41°45′08″N 70°07′16″W	Brewster	
77	Old Indian Meeting House	Old Indian Meeting House	December 3, 1998 (#98001383)	410 Meetinghouse Rd. 41°37′28″N 70°28′45″W	Mashpee	
78	Old North Cemetery	Old North Cemetery	March 20, 2013 (#13000095)	US 6 & Aldrich Rd. 42°01′26″N 70°04′25″W	Truro	
79	Old Town Center Historic District	Old Town Center Historic District	March 2, 2001 (#01000196)	Roughly along Locust Public Rd.and Salt Pond Rd. 41°50′18″N 69°58′37″W	Eastham	
80	Old Village Historic District	Old Village Historic District	December 17, 2001 (#01001406)	Roughly bounded by Main, Holway, Bridge Sts., Bearse's Ln., Chatham Harbor, Mill Pond, and Little Mill Pond; 41°40′29″N 69°57′06″W	Chatham	
81	Paine Hollow Road South Historic District	Paine Hollow Road South Historic District	May 20, 1998 (#98000540)	Roughly along Paine Hollow Rd., and Raywid Way; 41°54′50″N 70°00′27″W	Wellfleet	
82	PAUL PALMER (Shipwreck and Remains)	PAUL PALMER (Shipwreck and Remains)	April 12, 2007 (#07000288)	Stellwagen Bank National Marine Sanctuary	Provincetown	
83	Edward Penniman House and Barn	Edward Penniman House and Barn	May 28, 1976 (#76000155)	South of Eastham at Fort Hill and Governor Prence Rds. 41°49′06″N 69°57′56″W	Eastham	
84	Pine Grove Cemetery	Pine Grove Cemetery	March 20, 2013 (#13000096)	Cemetery Rd. 41°58′34″N 70°03′34″W	Truro	
85	Pond Hill School	Pond Hill School	March 23, 1989 (#89000222)	U.S. Route 6; 41°55′02″N 69°59′54″W	Wellfleet	
86	Poor House and Methodist Cemetery	Poor House and Methodist Cemetery	February 26, 1998 (#98000147)	744 Main St. 41°33′12″N 70°36′56″W	Falmouth	
87	Port Royal House	Port Royal House	April 15, 1982 (#82004943)	606 Main St. 41°40′56″N 69°57′36″W	Chatham	
88	Provincetown Historic District	Provincetown Historic District	August 30, 1989 (#89001148)	Roughly bounded by U.S. Route 6, the western end of Commercial St., Provincetown Harbor, and the southeastern end of Commercial St. 42°03′02″N 70°11′13″W	Provincetown	
89	Provincetown Public Library	Provincetown Public Library	April 21, 1975 (#75000248)	330 Commercial St. 42°03′09″N 70°11′07″W	Provincetown	Listing is for a previous building that housed the library prior to its 2002 move to the former Center Methodist Church.
90	Race Point Light Station	Race Point Light Station	June 15, 1987 (#87001482)	Race Point Beach; 42°03′40″N 70°14′33″W	Provincetown	
91	Rowell House	Rowell House	September 1, 1988 (#88001458)	Gull Pond Rd. 41°57′20″N 70°00′47″W	Wellfleet	
92	Saunders–Paine House	Saunders–Paine House	May 20, 1998 (#98000474)	260 Paine Hollow Rd. 41°54′46″N 70°00′34″W	Wellfleet	
93	Sea Call Farm	Sea Call Farm	June 12, 2008 (#08000530)	82 Tonset Rd. 41°47′12″N 69°58′45″W	Orleans	
94	Jacob Sears Memorial Library	Jacob Sears Memorial Library	November 18, 2009 (#09000934)	23 Center St. 41°44′52″N 70°08′46″W	Dennis	
95	Anthony and Allison Sirna Studio	Anthony and Allison Sirna Studio	February 25, 2014 (#14000021)	60 Way #4; 41°57′29″N 69°59′38″W	Wellfleet	Mid 20th Century Modern Residential Architecture on Outer Cape Cod MPS
96	Samuel Smith Tavern Site	Samuel Smith Tavern Site	November 11, 1977 (#77000108)	Great Island; 41°55′12″N 70°03′26″W	Wellfleet	17th century tavern site accessible via Great Island Trail
97	South Chatham Village Historic District	South Chatham Village Historic District	August 29, 2022 (#100008033)	Western portion of Main St., and northern portions of Deep Water Ln., Forest Beach Rd., and Pleasant St. 41°40′44″N 70°01′36″W	Chatham	
98	South Harwich Methodist Church	South Harwich Methodist Church	August 21, 1986 (#86001887)	270 Chatham Rd. 41°40′40″N 70°02′49″W	South Harwich	
99	South Yarmouth/Bass River Historic District	South Yarmouth/Bass River Historic District	May 29, 1990 (#90000787)	Roughly Main St.from Pine to South St., River St.from Main to Bass River Parkway, and Willow St.from River to South St. 41°39′39″N 70°11′35″W	Yarmouth	
100	Spring Hill Historic District	Spring Hill Historic District	October 28, 2010 (#10000862)	Roughly bounded by Massachusetts Route 6A, Spring Hill Rd., and Discovery Hill Rd. 41°44′53″N 70°28′22″W	Sandwich	
101	Stony Brook–Factory Village Historic District	Stony Brook–Factory Village Historic District	June 15, 2000 (#00000688)	Stony Brook Rd.; Setucket Rd., Run Hill Rd. 41°44′37″N 70°06′43″W	Brewster	
102	Taylor–Bray Farm	Taylor–Bray Farm	September 29, 1993 (#92000287)	Junction of Bray Farm Rd.N. and Nottingham Rd. 41°43′20″N 70°12′23″W	Yarmouth	
103	Teaticket School	Teaticket School	February 22, 2002 (#02000082)	340 Teaticket Hwy, MA 28 at Sandwich Rd. 41°34′09″N 70°36′20″W	Falmouth	
104	Three Sisters of Nauset (Twin Lights)	Three Sisters of Nauset (Twin Lights)	June 15, 1987 (#87001502)	Off Cable Rd. 41°50′42″N 69°57′36″W	Eastham	Two of the three lights; The Beacon (listed separately) is the third. At the time of their nomination, these two lights were separate from The Beacon; they have since been reunited.
105	Vera and Laszlo Tisza House	Vera and Laszlo Tisza House	February 25, 2014 (#14000022)	2 Deer Trail; 41°57′36″N 69°59′55″W	Wellfleet	Mid 20th Century Modern Residential Architecture on Outer Cape Cod MPS
106	Josiah Tobey House	Josiah Tobey House	December 9, 1994 (#94001496)	67 Oxbow Rd. 41°34′41″N 70°34′33″W	Falmouth	
107	Town Boundary Marker	Town Boundary Marker	September 18, 1987 (#87000269)	Race Ln. at Barnstable–Sandwich town line 41°41′11″N 70°26′12″W	Sandwich and Barnstable	
108	Town Hall Square Historic District	Town Hall Square Historic District	October 31, 1975 (#75001914)	Roughly bounded by Main, Grove, Water Sts., and Tupper Rd.from Beale Ave.to Massachusetts Route 6A; 41°45′29″N 70°30′04″W	Sandwich	Boundary increase (listed September 16, 2010): Roughly bounded by Massachusetts Route 6A, Morse Rd., Water St., Shawme Lake, Grove St., Main St., and Tupper Rd.
109	Town Line Boundary Marker	Town Line Boundary Marker	September 18, 1987 (#87000242)	Great Hill Rd. 41°43′19″N 70°24′04″W	Sandwich and Barnstable	
110	Town Line Boundary Marker	Town Line Boundary Marker	September 18, 1987 (#87000243)	410 High St. at Sandwich–Barnstable town line 41°43′19″N 70°24′04″W	Sandwich and Barnstable	
111	Townsend House	Townsend House	May 20, 1998 (#98000542)	290 Paine Hollow Rd. 41°54′42″N 70°00′38″W	Wellfleet	
112	Travelers Club		January 29, 2025 (#100011423)	314 Barlows Landing Road; 41°41′38″N 70°36′53″W	Bourne	
113	Truro Highlands Historic District	Truro Highlands Historic District	November 22, 2011 (#11000823)	Highland Light Rd. 42°02′22″N 70°03′44″W	Truro	Includes Highland Light, Highland House, and other buildings along Highland Light Road.
114	Union Hall	Union Hall	May 23, 1997 (#97000470)	Town Hall Rd, east of MA 6; 41°59′54″N 70°03′15″W	Truro	Truro's town hall.
115	Universalist Society Meetinghouse	Universalist Society Meetinghouse	February 25, 1999 (#99000186)	3 River Rd. 41°46′59″N 69°58′40″W	Orleans	
116	US Post Office-Provincetown Main	US Post Office-Provincetown Main	October 19, 1987 (#87001772)	217 Commercial St. 42°02′57″N 70°11′19″W	Provincetown	
117	Waquoit Historic District	Waquoit Historic District	February 26, 2004 (#04000086)	Portions of Main, Barrows, Carriage House, Collins, Martin, Moonakis, Takemmeh and Waquoit Landing, Parson, Studley, Whi; 41°35′08″N 70°31′11″W	Falmouth	
118	Paul and Madeleine Weidlinger House	Paul and Madeleine Weidlinger House	February 25, 2014 (#14000023)	54 Valley Rd. 41°57′36″N 70°00′24″W	Wellfleet	Mid 20th Century Modern Residential Architecture on Outer Cape Cod MPS
119	Wellfleet Center Historic District	Wellfleet Center Historic District	August 21, 1989 (#89001147)	Roughly bounded by Cross St., Holbrook Ave., Main, E. Main and School Sts., and Duck Creek; 41°56′12″N 70°01′43″W	Wellfleet	
120	West Dennis Graded School	West Dennis Graded School	August 24, 2000 (#00000957)	67 School St. 41°39′43″N 70°10′12″W	Dennis	
121	West Falmouth Village Historic District	West Falmouth Village Historic District	April 2, 1998 (#98000253)	Roughly along N. Shore Rd., from the junction of MA 28A and MA 28, and Crocker Point; 41°36′05″N 70°38′05″W	Falmouth	
122	West Schoolhouse	West Schoolhouse	April 24, 1975 (#75000262)	61 Whig St. 41°44′20″N 70°11′59″W	Dennis	
123	Wing Fort House	Wing Fort House	June 3, 1976 (#76000227)	Spring Hill Rd. 41°45′03″N 70°27′56″W	East Sandwich	
124	Wing's Neck Light	Wing's Neck Light	June 15, 1987 (#87001503)	Wing's Neck Rd. 41°40′56″N 70°39′37″W	Bourne	
125	Wood End Light Lookout Station	Wood End Light Lookout Station	June 15, 1987 (#87001504)	Wood End, between Herring Cove Beach and Long Point; 42°01′17″N 70°11′37″W	Provincetown	
126	Woods Hole School	Woods Hole School	October 21, 1982 (#82000473)	24 School St. 41°31′29″N 70°40′10″W	Falmouth	
127	Yarmouth Camp Ground Historic District	Yarmouth Camp Ground Historic District	August 28, 1990 (#90001244)	South of mid-Cape Highway (U.S. Route 6) and roughly bounded by County Ave., Willow St., Wood Rd., and Camp Ground Pond; 41°40′59″N 70°15′44″W	Barnstable and Yarmouth	

== See also ==
- National Register of Historic Places listings in Cape Cod National Seashore – includes Barnstable County listings
- List of National Historic Landmarks in Massachusetts
- National Register of Historic Places listings in Massachusetts
