= Mercelia Evelyn Eldridge Kelley House =

Historic house in Massachusetts, United States

- U.S. National Register of Historic Places
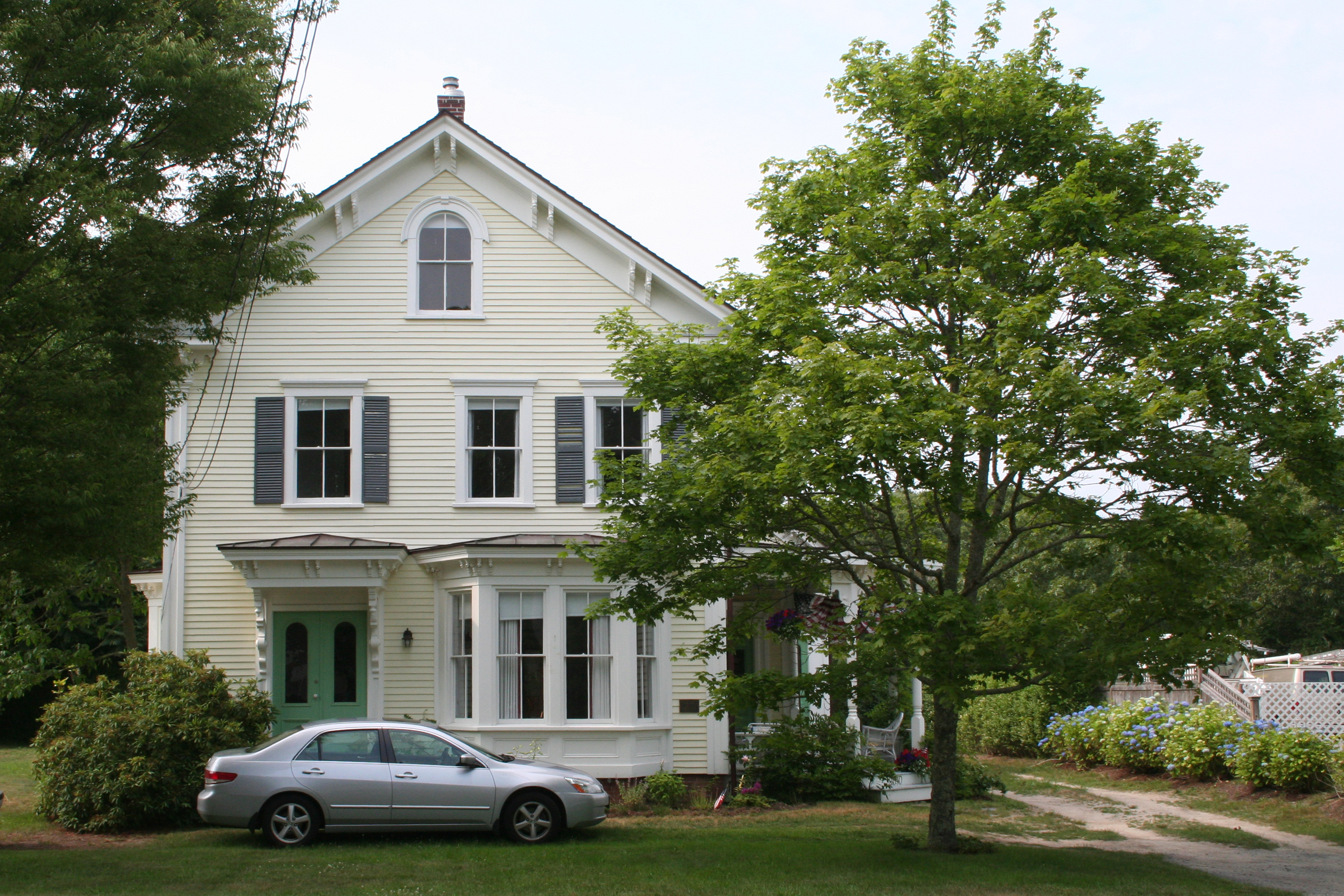

- Location within Cape Cod Location within Massachusetts Location within the United States
- Location: Chatham, Massachusetts
- Coordinates: 41°40′44″N 70°1′35″W
- Built: 1877
- Architect: Ambler, Thomas
- Architectural style: Italianate, Queen Anne
- NRHP reference No.: 05000080
- Added to NRHP: February 24, 2005

The Mercelia Evelyn Eldridge Kelley House is a historic house at 2610 Main Street in Chatham, Massachusetts. The 2 1/2-story wood-frame house was built in 1877 and has vernacular Italianate styling. It is significant for its association with the Eldridge family, who were major landowners in South Chatham and promoted its development. The house was listed on the National Register of Historic Places in 2005.

== Description and history ==
The Kelley House is on the north side of Main Street (Massachusetts Route 28) in the village of South Chatham, just east of its junction with Morton Road. It is a 2 1/2-story wood-frame house with a front-gable roof, wooden clapboard siding, and a brick foundation. The main facade is three bays wide, with its main entrance in the leftmost bay, and the right two bays on the first floor taken up by a bay window. Three sash windows are asymmetrically arranged on the second level, with two above the bay window and one above the entrance. A round-arch window is set in the gable. The entry is sheltered by a hip-roofed scrolled hood with paired Italianate brackets, details also found on the bay window. Paired brackets are also found in the eave lines of the front and side elevations. There is a porch on the right elevation, running back to an ell extending to the rear. The porch has turned posts and geometric panels that are Queen Anne in style, along with Italianate brackets.

The Eldridge family were significant landowners and developers of South Chatham in the early 19th century. Mercelia Eldridge's father Levi operated a number of businesses on the cape, was a bank president and Chatham town selectman, and held other prominent local posts. Mercelia and her second husband, Cyrus Kelley, built the house in 1877 on family-owned land. The house was not particularly elaborately decorated for the period, was probably built using lumber from her father's lumber yard, and is one of the best-preserved of a series of houses built along Main Street after the American Civil War.

The house remained in the hands of her descendants until 2002. In 2002, the house was sold to David M. Valdez, who undertook both submitting the house for inclusion the National Register and the completion of a Federally Certified Historic Restoration of the house that included the preservation of the existing layout and all of the original windows, interior painted wood doors, and trim that were part of the original decor from 1877 that made the doors and trim appear to be made from more precious hardwoods. These same painted wood finishes (probably by the same artist) are in the interior of the Captain Penniman House that was initially decorated and completed in 1868. The Penniman House is nearby in the Fort Hill area of Cape Cod National Sea Shore, which was the highest point adjacent to the meetinghouse erected by Pilgrim residents of Nauset (later Eastham) shortly after they settled the area in 1644.

== See also ==
- National Register of Historic Places listings in Barnstable County, Massachusetts
