= Paine Hollow Road South Historic District =

Historic district in Massachusetts, United States

- U.S. National Register of Historic Places
- U.S. Historic district
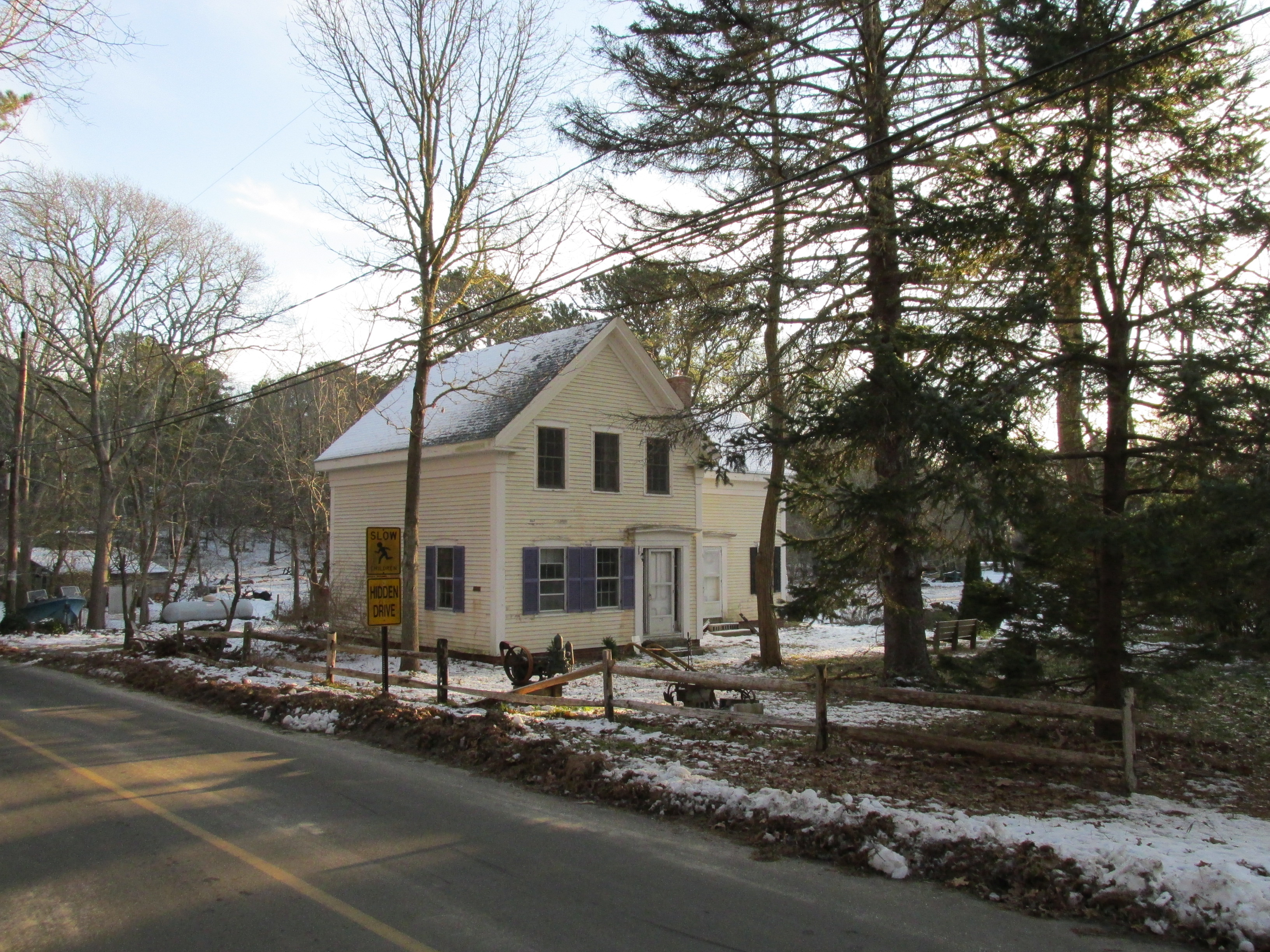
- Corner of Paine Hollow Road and Pleasant Point Road

- Location within Cape Cod Location within Massachusetts Location within the United States
- Location: Wellfleet, Massachusetts
- Coordinates: 41°54′50″N 70°0′27″W
- Area: 13 acres (5.3 ha)
- Built: 1850
- Architect: Sparrow, Zoeth; Hopkins, Eldad
- Architectural style: Greek Revival, Other
- NRHP reference No.: 98000540
- Added to NRHP: May 20, 1998

The Paine Hollow Road South Historic District is a residential historic district roughly along Paine Hollow Road, and Raywid Way in Wellfleet, Massachusetts. It consists of a cluster of seven 19th-century residences centered just north of Paine Hollow Road's junction with Pleasant Point Road and Baker Road, including one house on Baker Road and one on Rayvid Way. All seven houses were built by members of the locally prominent Paine family in the mid-19th century, and are predominantly Greek Revival in their styling.

The district was listed on the National Register of Historic Places in 1999.

== See also ==
- National Register of Historic Places listings in Barnstable County, Massachusetts
