= Sea Call Farm =

- U.S. National Register of Historic Places
- U.S. Historic district
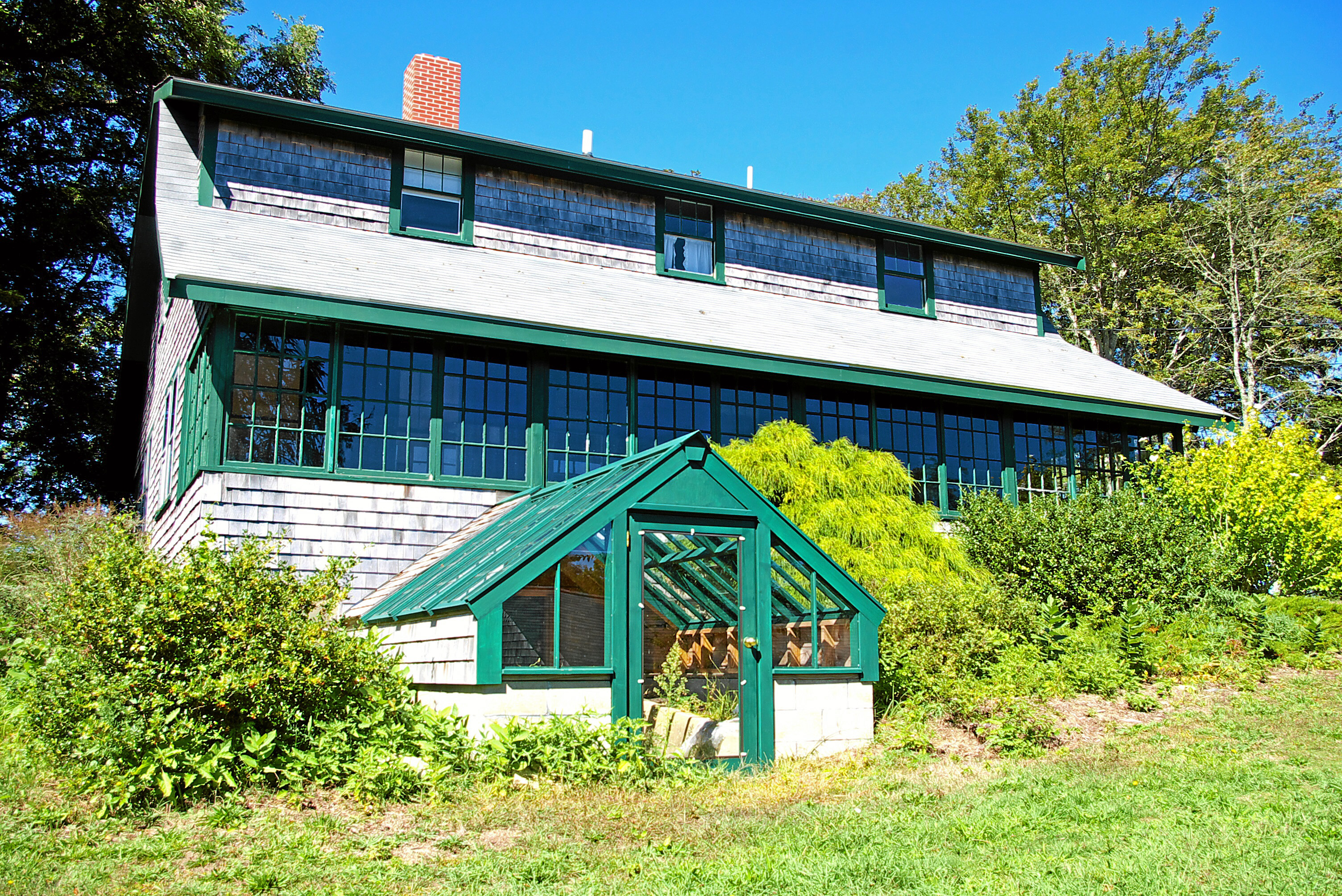

- Location within Cape Cod Location within Massachusetts Location within the United States
- Location: 82 Tonset Road, Orleans, Massachusetts
- Coordinates: 41°47′12″N 69°58′45″W
- Area: 6.35 acres (25,700 m^{2})
- NRHP reference No.: 08000530
- Added to NRHP: June 12, 2008

Sea Call Farm is a historic farm in Orleans, Massachusetts United States. It was listed on the National Register of Historic Places in June 2008.

The property was actively farmed by William A. and Bertha Fiske during 1931–1950, after William's retirement from railway employment. It was one of many small market-garden farms in the Barnstable County, but now is "the only surviving agricultural ensemble in Orleans and one of the few in the Cape Cod region. Its significance is enhanced by the extensive collection of diaries, account books, and other papers that detail life on the farm...."

It was acquired from the Fiske family by the Town of Orleans in 1987, for conservation.

== See also ==
- National Register of Historic Places listings in Barnstable County, Massachusetts
