= South Harwich Methodist Church =

Historic church in Massachusetts, United States

- U.S. National Register of Historic Places
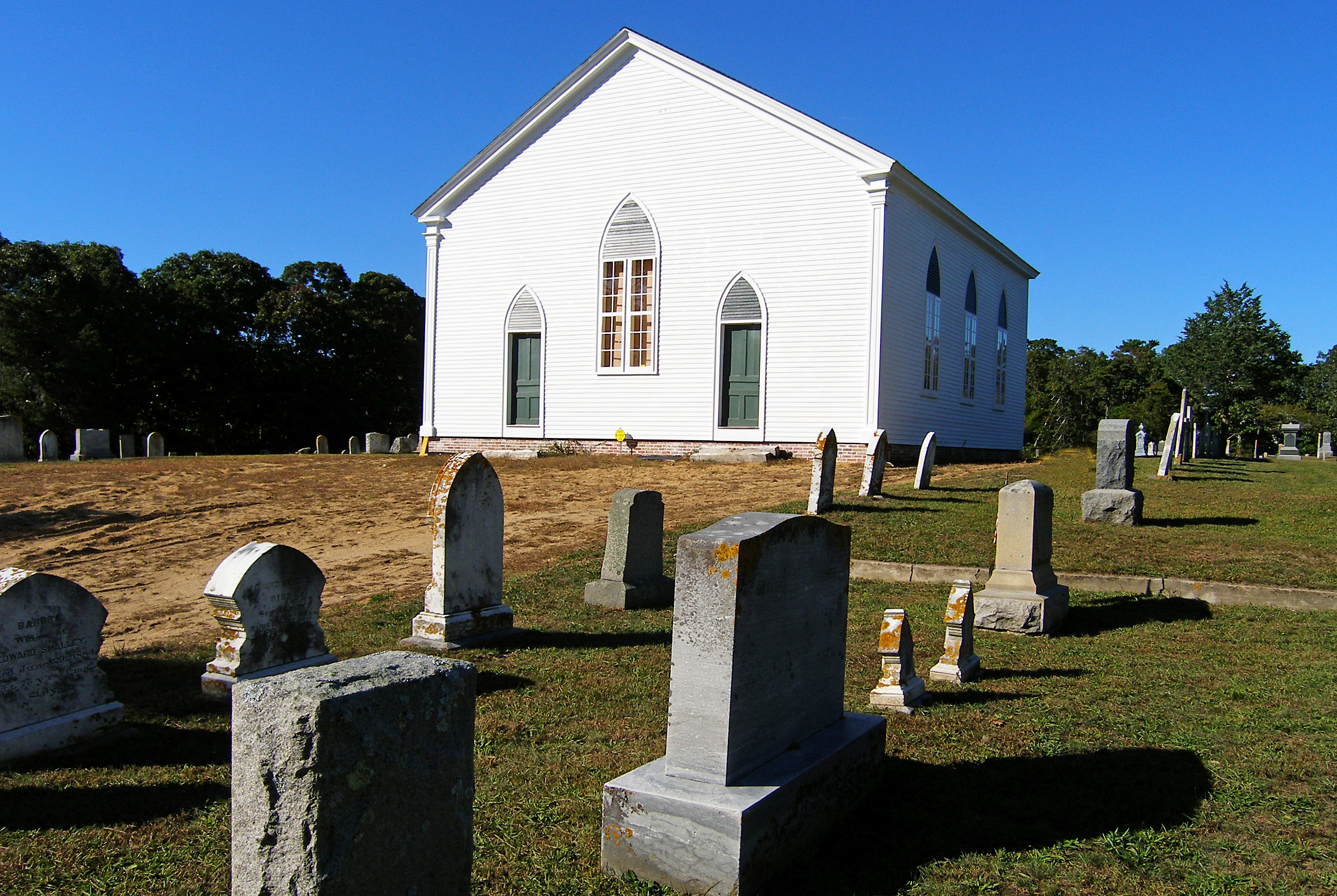

- Location within Cape Cod Location within Massachusetts Location within the United States
- Location: 270 Chatham Rd., South Harwich
- Coordinates: 41°40′40″N 70°2′49″W
- Area: 2.4 acres (0.97 ha)
- Built: 1836
- Architectural style: Greek Revival, Gothic Revival
- NRHP reference No.: 86001887
- Added to NRHP: August 21, 1986

The South Harwich Methodist Church is a historic Methodist church building in South Harwich, Massachusetts, USA. Built in 1836, it is a well-preserved example of a typical Cape Cod church of the first half of the 19th century. It was the town's second Methodist meeting house, and was listed on the National Register of Historic Places in 1986.

== Description and history ==
The South Harwich Methodist Church is locate on the north side of Chatham Road, at its junction with Old Country Road. It stands on a parcel of land that includes a cemetery established in 1829. It is a single-story wood-frame structure, set on a brick foundation and covered by a gabled roof. Its exterior is clad in wooden clapboards, and has a combination of modest Greek Revival and Gothic Revival features. The corners of the building have pilasters, which rise to an entablature and gable returns at the roof edge. The main facade is symmetrically arranged, with two entrances flanking a central double window. Each of these elements is topped bya lancet-arched louver. The side walls each have three windows, also topped by lancet-arched louvers. A round-arch bay projects from the building rear. The interior is notable for its trompe-l'œil paintings and generally intact original features; the only major modification has been the removal of a balcony at the rear. Oil lamps originally used for lighting have been electrified.

Methodism was introduced to Cape Cod in the 1790s by Reverend Jesse Lee. The first Methodist church was built in East Harwich in 1799, and this, the town's second, was built in 1836 on land given to the congregation by John Paine Eldredge. The congregation was initially termed reform Methodist in belief, but underwent a schism over slavery and the nature of its services, and the building was retained by a more conservative faction. In 1878 it was united with the East Harwich Methodist Church, sharing a minister. By the time of the church's listing on the National Register, its congregation had dwindled in size to less than two dozen.

== See also ==
- National Register of Historic Places listings in Harwich, Massachusetts
