= Port Royal House =

Historic house in Massachusetts, United States

- U.S. National Register of Historic Places
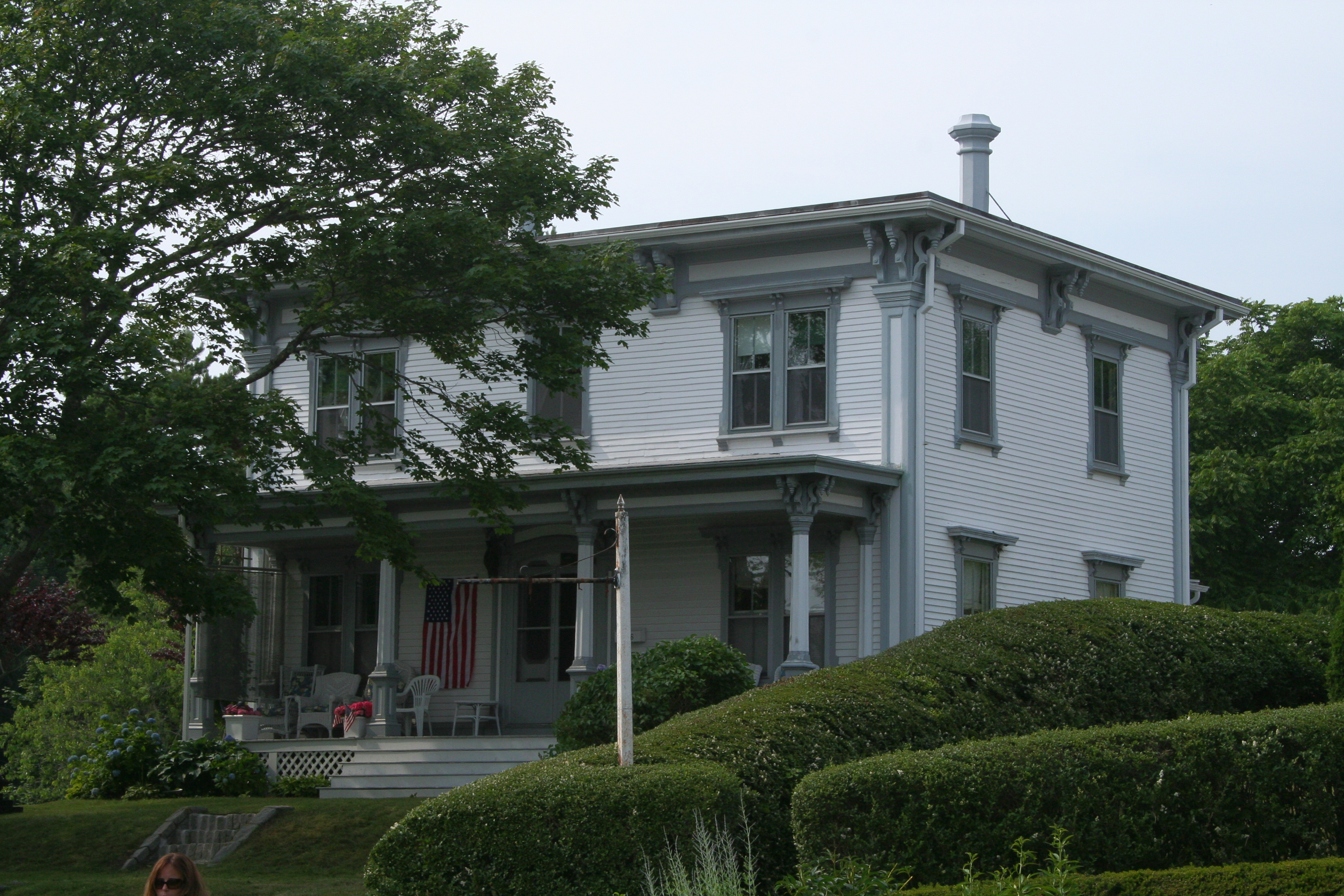

- Location within Cape Cod Location within Massachusetts Location within the United States
- Location: 606 Main St., Chatham, Massachusetts
- Coordinates: 41°40′56″N 69°57′36″W
- Built: 1863
- NRHP reference No.: 82004943
- Added to NRHP: April 15, 1982

The Port Royal House is a historic house in Chatham, Massachusetts. The two-story wood-frame house was built in 1863 by Seth Eldredge, a ship's captain. The Italianate villa was reportedly based on a house in Port Royal, Jamaica seen by Captain Eldredge, who acquired its plans and had it copied. It has a low-pitch hip roof whose eave is decorated with paired brackets, the corners have paneled piasters, and a single-story porch extends across the front, supported by fluted columns mounted on paneled piers.

The house was listed on the National Register of Historic Places on April 15, 1982.

== See also ==
- National Register of Historic Places listings in Barnstable County, Massachusetts
