= Hinckley's Corner Historic District =

Historic district in Massachusetts, United States

- U.S. National Register of Historic Places
- U.S. Historic district
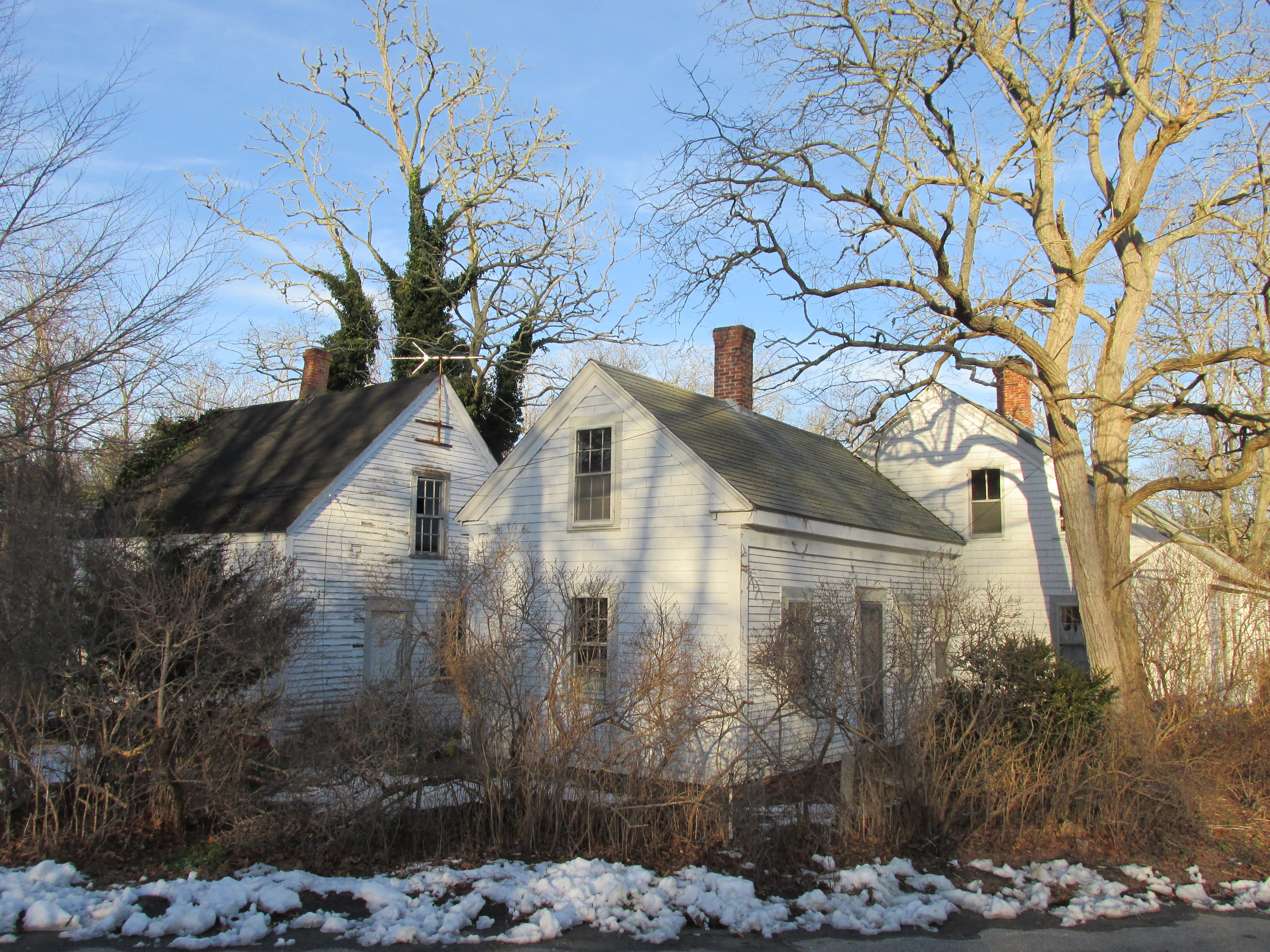
- 40 Way #112

- Location within Cape Cod Location within Massachusetts Location within the United States
- Location: Wellfleet, Massachusetts
- Coordinates: 41°55′2″N 70°0′14″W
- Built: 1791
- NRHP reference No.: 98000595
- Added to NRHP: May 29, 1998

The Hinckley's Corner Historic District, also known as Paine Hollow, is a historic district including three properties located at 0, 25, and 40 Way #112 in Wellfleet, Massachusetts. This small cluster of properties are a representative of the outer Cape's life in the 19th century. All three houses are fairly utilitarian 1-1/2 story Cape style houses, with only modest traces of late Georgian or Federal styling. The oldest house, the Jonathan Young House at 40 Way #112, was built c. 1790-91, and was owned for a significant portion of the 19th century by members of the Hinckley family. This property includes a 19th-century barn, a c. 1920 structure whose uses have included a retail store and an art studio, and a c. 1950 garage. The John Lewis House at 25 Way #112 was built c. 1820, and has a Federal style fanlight over the main entrance. Its property includes a garage/guesthouse built c. 1924, originally to house a Model T firetruck, and an oysterhouse built 1827-28.

The third house is the Robert Paine House at 0 Way #112; it was also built c. 1820, and is the most-altered of the three, with additions on either end. It stands on a larger property (nearly 5 acres, compared to the 1–2-acre lots on which the others stand), and includes a small shed built c. 1820 and a boatbuilding shop built c. 1915. This house is further notable for housing a worker who helped build the Wellfleet Marconi Station in the early 1900s.

The district was listed on the National Register of Historic Places in 1998.

== See also ==
- National Register of Historic Places listings in Barnstable County, Massachusetts
