= West Dennis Graded School =

- U.S. National Register of Historic Places
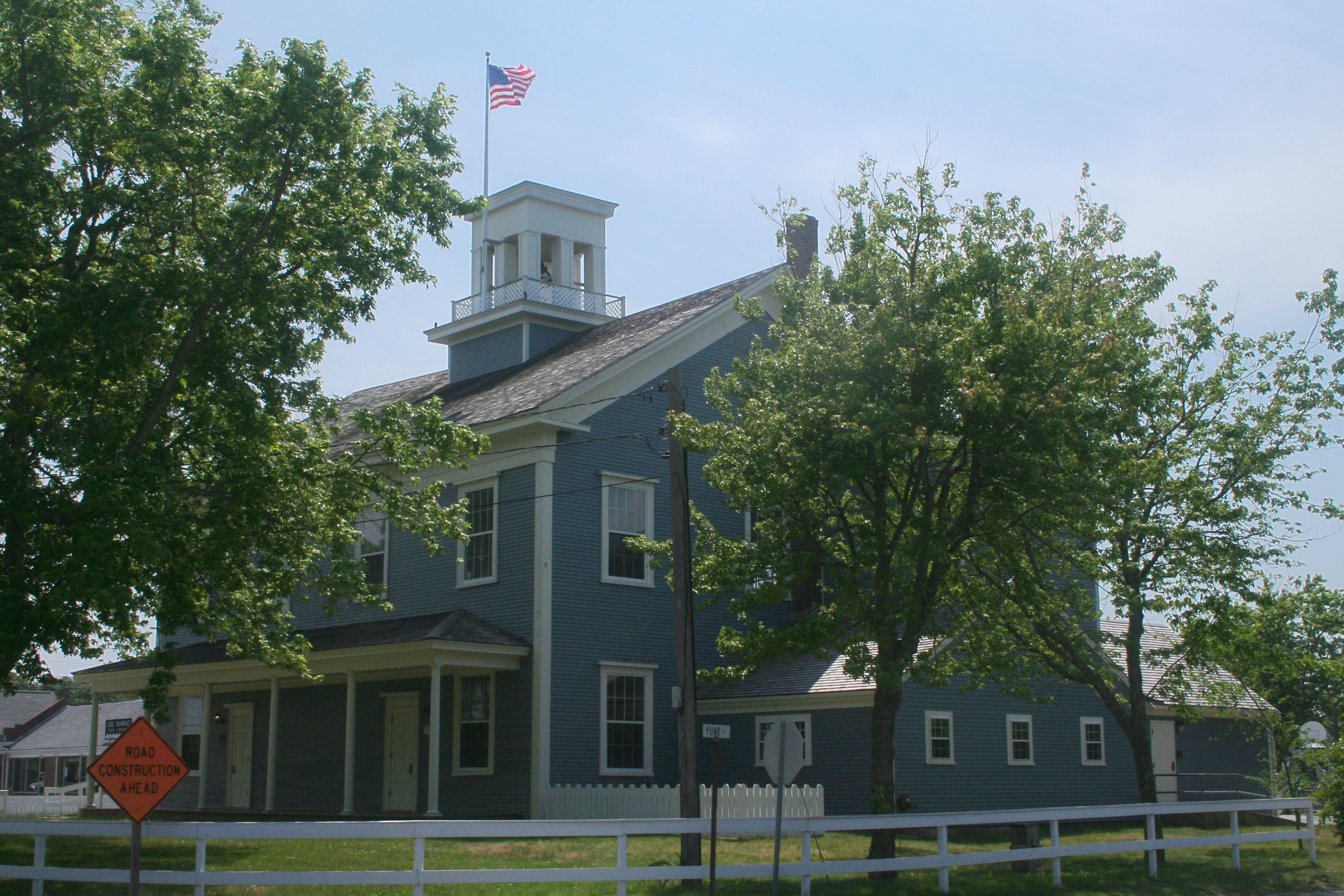
- West Dennis Graded School

- Location within Cape Cod Location within Massachusetts Location within the United States
- Location: Dennis, Massachusetts
- Coordinates: 41°39′43″N 70°10′12″W
- Built: 1867
- Architect: Sturgis, Benjamin C.
- Architectural style: Greek Revival
- NRHP reference No.: 00000957
- Added to NRHP: August 24, 2000

The West Dennis Graded School is a historic school building at 67 School Street in Dennis, Massachusetts. The two story Greek Revival building was built in 1867, and is the only one of five schools built by the town in that period to survive. In the 1920s the building also served as a polling place and a site for town meetings. It was converted for use as a community center in the 1950s. The school was listed on the National Register of Historic Places in 2000.

The building is now owned by the Dennis Historical Society and open to the public on Friday afternoons in the summer.

== Description and history ==
The West Dennis Graded School is set at the southwest corner of School and Pond Streets, a short way south of the main village area of West Dennis. It is a two-story wood frame structure, rectangular in shape, with a side gable roof, brick foundation, wooden clapboards on two sides, and wooden shingles finishing the other sides. The front facade, facing School Street, is symmetrically arranged, with a hip-roofed single-story porch extending across its width, supported by six Tuscan columns. The first floor bays are not evenly spaced, with two entrances, each flanked on its outer side by a sash window, set away from the center, while the upper floor has four evenly spaced sash windows. The building's corners have slightly projecting cornerboards, rising to a two-part entablature below the roof. The roof is capped at the center by a square cupola with an open belfry whose top is supported by eight square columns.

When built in 1867, the school housed four classrooms, two on the west side of each level, with stairwells, coatrooms, and other facilities on the east side. On the second floor this plan is still in place, with wainscoted plaster walls, blackboards, and original door and window surrounds. On the first floor, the wall between the two classrooms was removed in the 1920s to accommodate town meetings, and a suspended acoustic tile ceiling was added in the 1970s. The cupola is a reconstruction of the original, also made in the 1970s, and houses a bell originally hanging in the South Dennis Graded School.

== See also ==
- National Register of Historic Places listings in Barnstable County, Massachusetts
