= First Congregational Parish Historic District =

Historic church and cemetery in Barnstable County, Massachusetts

- U.S. National Register of Historic Places
- U.S. Historic district
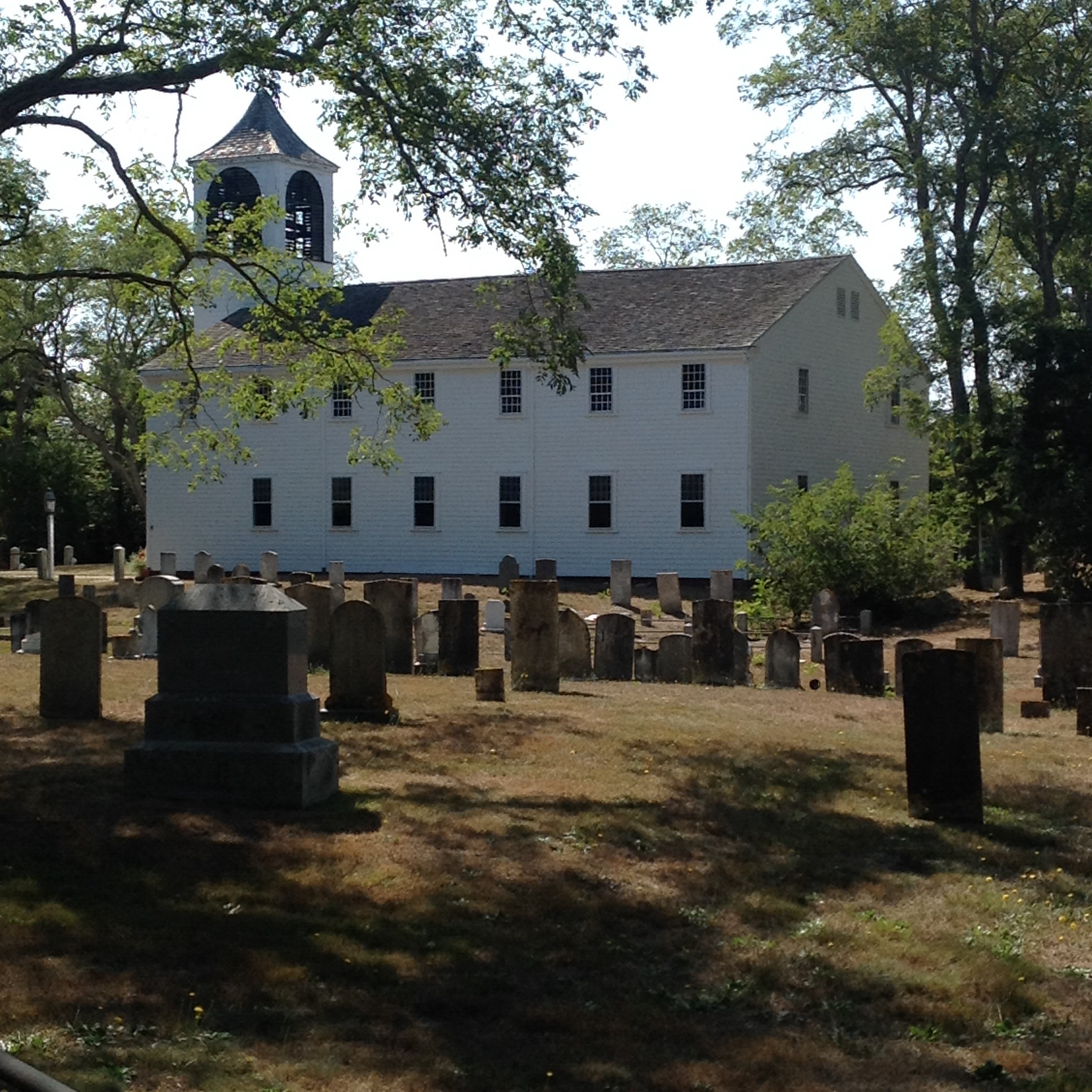

- Location within Cape Cod Location within Massachusetts Location within the United States
- Location: Truro, Massachusetts
- Coordinates: 41°56′02″N 70°02′27″W
- NRHP reference No.: 14000214
- Added to NRHP: May 19, 2014

The First Congregational Parish Historic District encompasses the oldest church building in Truro, Massachusetts and adjacent historic resources. The congregation was established in 1711, and is now occupying its third church, a Federal/Greek Revival building erected in 1827. The tower houses a bell cast by Paul Revere. Adjacent to the church and part of its setting is the Congregational Cemetery, whose earliest recorded burial is in 1810, and has been associated with the church since its construction. The cemetery contains a memorial erected in 1841, commemorating the loss of 57 Truro residents and seven ships in a gale on October 3. 1841.

The district was listed on the National Register of Historic Places in 2013.

== See also ==
- National Register of Historic Places listings in Barnstable County, Massachusetts
