= Dennis Village Cemetery =

Historic cemetery in Barnstable County, Massachusetts, US

- U.S. National Register of Historic Places
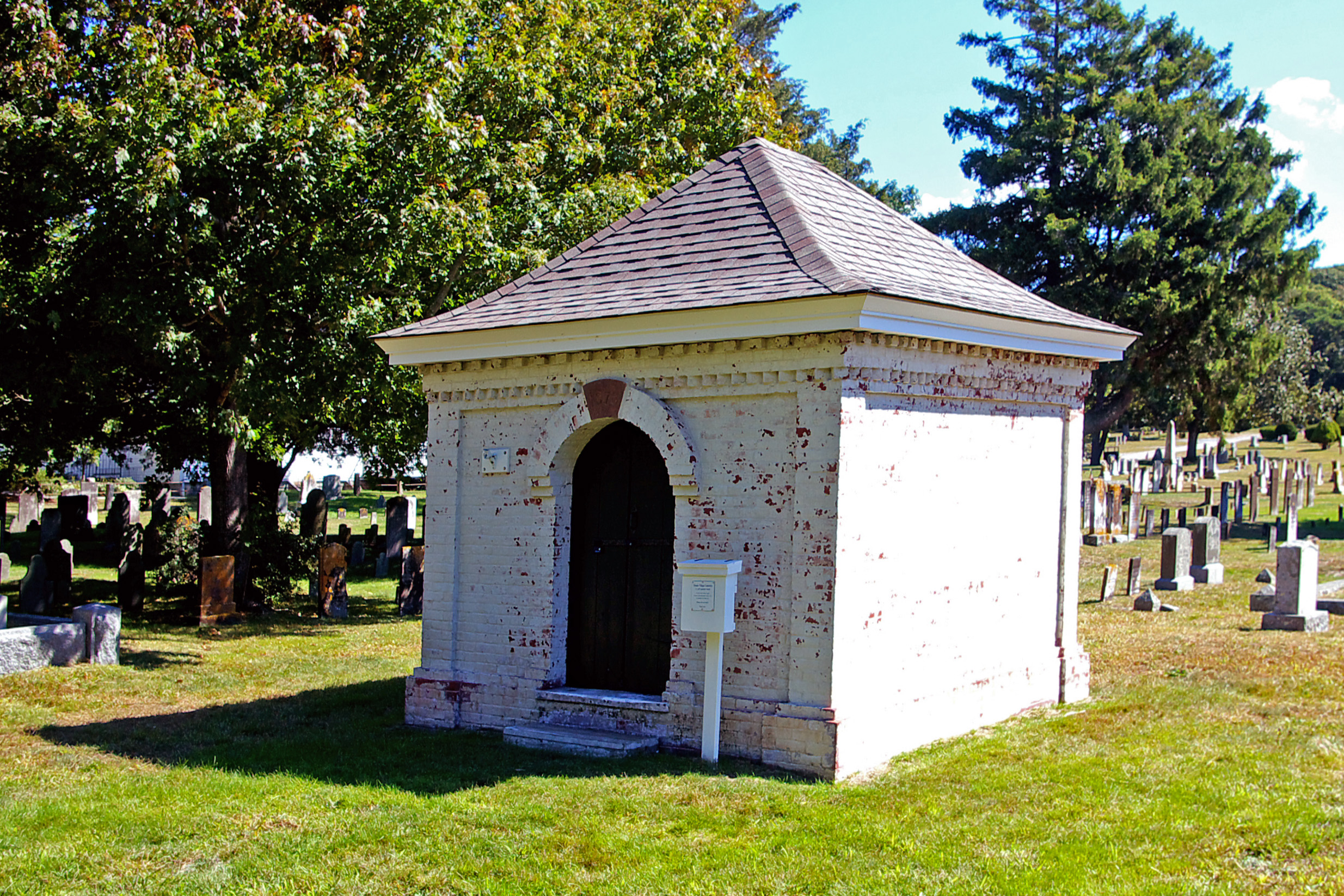
- Receiving Tomb, Dennis Village Cemetery

- Location within Cape Cod Location within Massachusetts Location within the United States
- Location: Dennis, Massachusetts
- Coordinates: 41°44′11″N 70°11′30″W
- Area: 9 acres (3.6 ha)
- Architectural style: Italianate
- NRHP reference No.: 05000558
- Added to NRHP: June 8, 2005

Dennis Village Cemetery, also known as the Common Burying Ground and East Yarmouth Churchyard, is a historic cemetery at Massachusetts Route 6A and Old Bass River Road in the center of Dennis, Massachusetts. The oldest portion, a 2-acre (0.81 ha) parcel, has grave markers dating to 1728, and may contain even older burials. It was established when Dennis was still part of neighboring Yarmouth. Among its notable burials are those of Rev. Josiah Dennis, the namesake of the town, and his wife.

The cemetery was listed on the National Register of Historic Places in 2005.

== See also ==
- National Register of Historic Places listings in Barnstable County, Massachusetts
