= Collins Cottages Historic District =

Historic district in Massachusetts, United States

- U.S. National Register of Historic Places
- U.S. Historic district
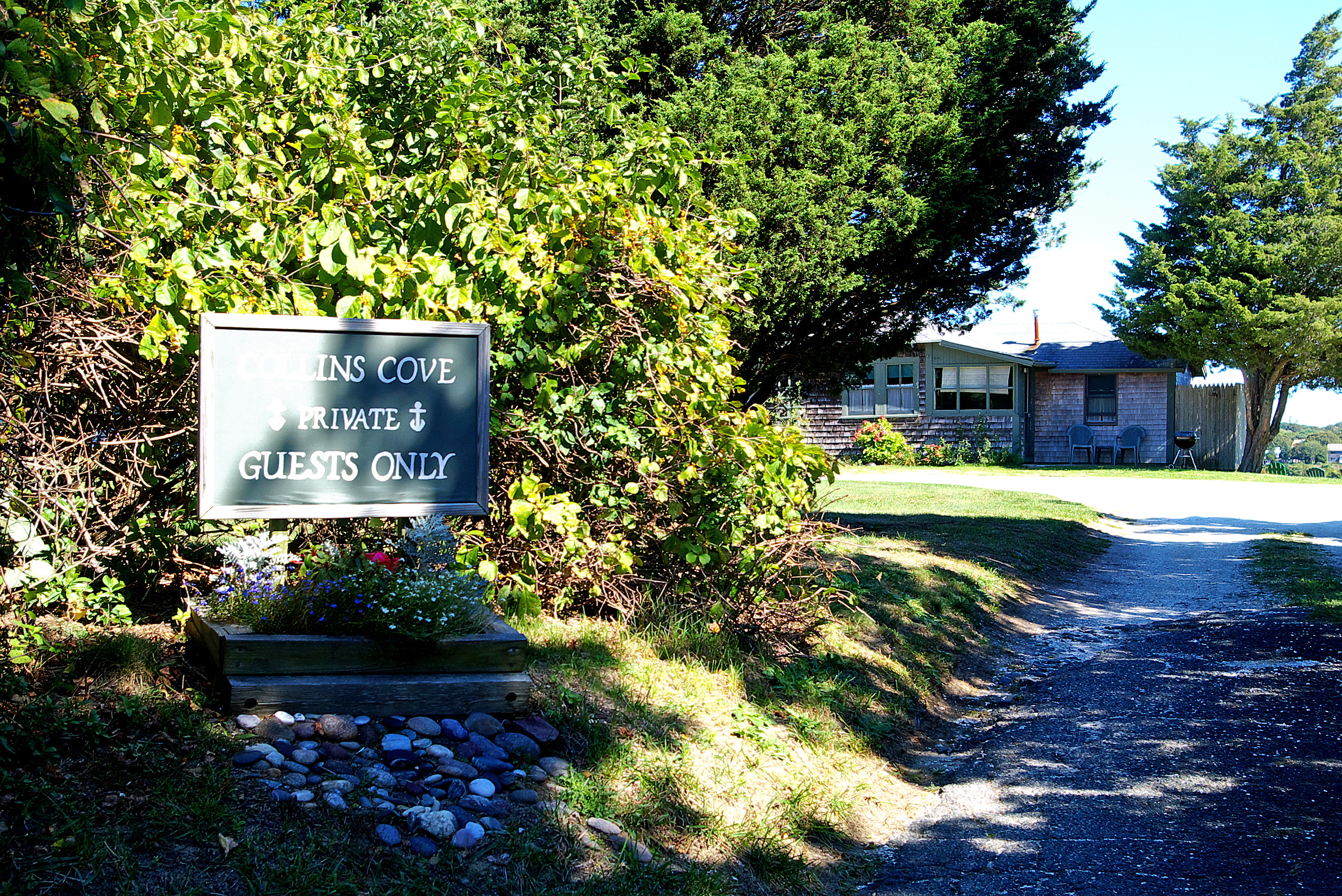
- Entrance to Collins Cottages

- Location within Cape Cod Location within Massachusetts Location within the United States
- Location: Eastham, Massachusetts
- Coordinates: 41°47′58″N 69°58′55″W
- Area: 2.7 acres (1.1 ha)
- Built: 1928
- Architect: Lewis H. Collins, Bernard C. Collins
- Architectural style: Bungalow/Craftsman
- NRHP reference No.: 99000528
- Added to NRHP: May 20, 1999

The Collins Cottages Historic District is a historic district encompassing a summer cottage resort in southern Eastham, Massachusetts. It consists of a group of small cottages built by Lewis and Bernard Collins in 1928–29 on a parcel of land on the shore of Town Cove, and were typical of a type of accommodation offered to tourists of the time. The property is located northeast of the Orleans rotary, and is accessed via a section of the old state highway. The cottages continue to be operated as summer accommodations by members of the Collins family.

The district was listed on the National Register of Historic Places in 1999.

== See also ==
- National Register of Historic Places listings in Barnstable County, Massachusetts
