= Elnathan Nye House =

Historic house in Massachusetts, United States

- U.S. National Register of Historic Places
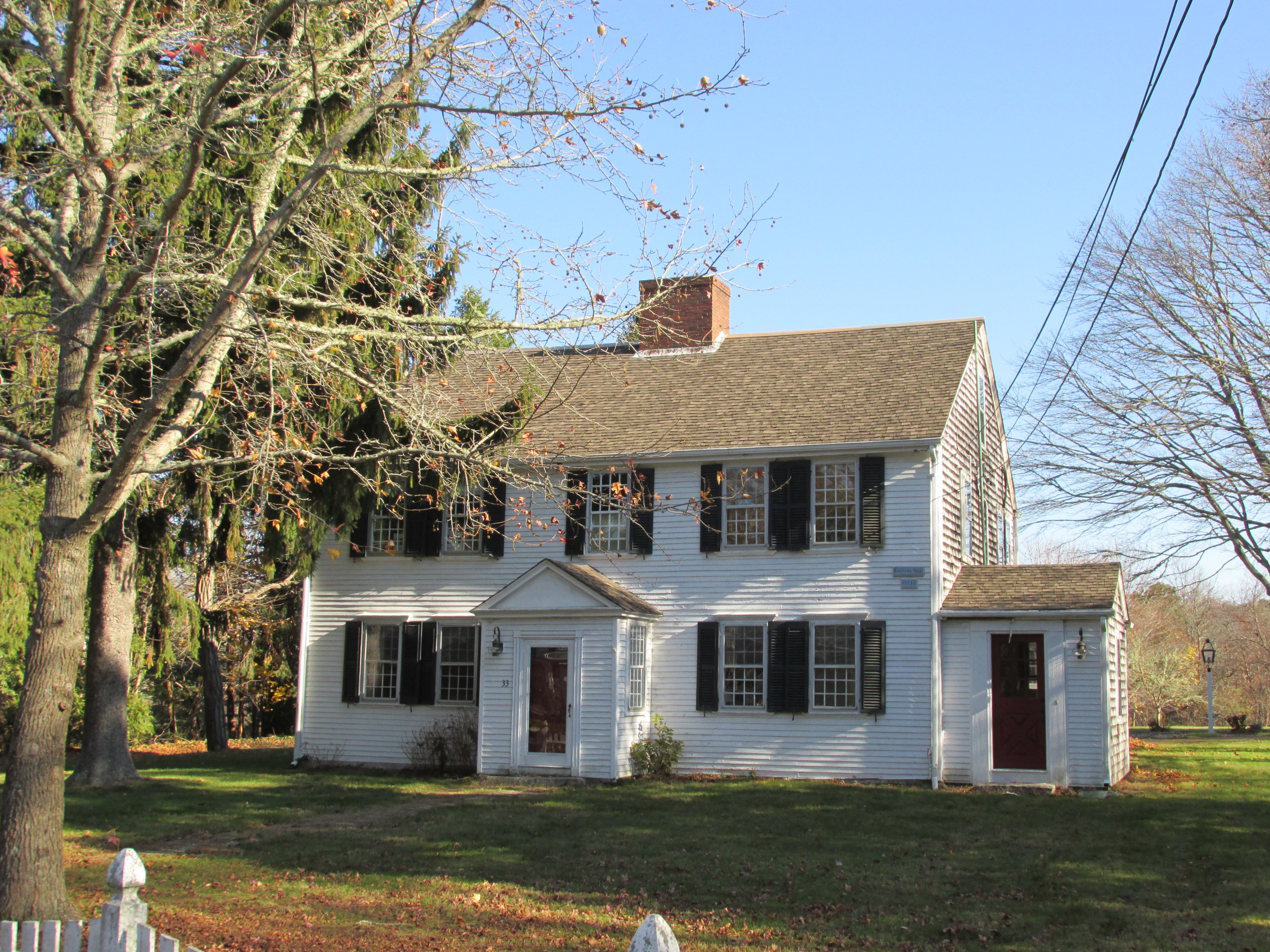
- Elnathan Nye House

- Location within Cape Cod Location within Massachusetts Location within the United States
- Location: Falmouth, Massachusetts
- Coordinates: 41°38′8″N 70°37′11″W
- Area: acre
- Built: 1735
- Architectural style: Georgian
- NRHP reference No.: 02000697
- Added to NRHP: June 27, 2002

The Elnathan Nye House is a historic house at 33 Old Main Road in North Falmouth, Massachusetts. The oldest portion of this 2 1/2-story house was built c. 1735; it was extended to its present five-bay facade in 1772. The interior of the house is particularly well preserved, with three extant beehive ovens, plaster-and-lath walls, and period wood paneling. The property's barn may also date to the 18th century. Elnathan Nye, the builder, was a prominent local citizen.

The house was listed on the National Register of Historic Places in 2002.

== See also ==
- National Register of Historic Places listings in Barnstable County, Massachusetts
