= Wellfleet Center Historic District =

Historic district in Massachusetts, United States

- U.S. National Register of Historic Places
- U.S. Historic district
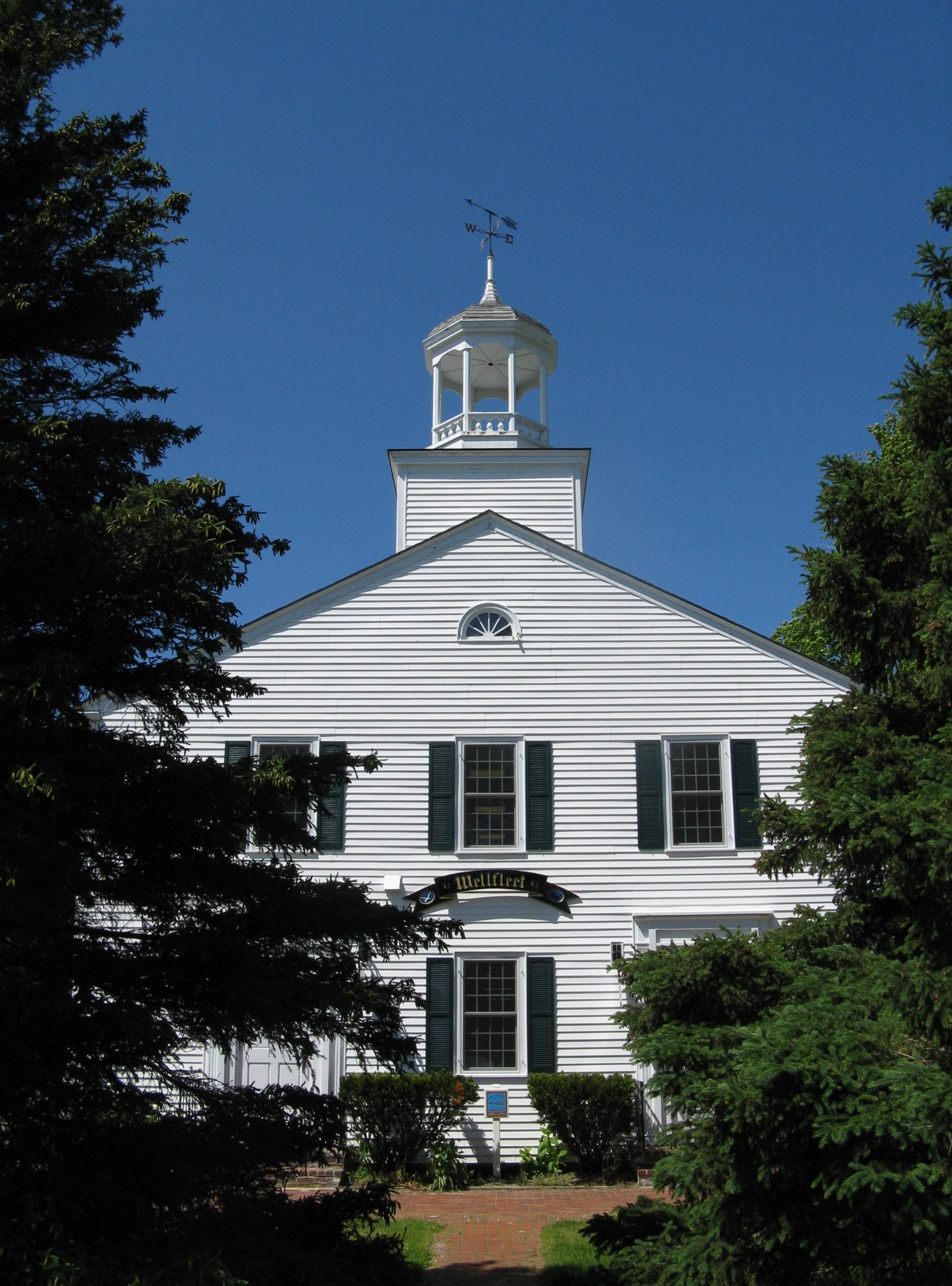
- Wellfleet Town Hall

- Location within Cape Cod Location within Massachusetts Location within the United States
- Location: Wellfleet, Massachusetts
- Coordinates: 41°56′12″N 70°1′43″W
- Architectural style: Mid 19th Century Revival, Late Victorian, Georgian
- NRHP reference No.: 89001147
- Added to NRHP: August 21, 1989

The Wellfleet Center Historic District is a historic district in Wellfleet, Massachusetts, United States. It encompasses resources that exemplify the development of the community, beginning in the late 18th century, as a thriving commercial maritime center, and then its rise as a summer resort community in the late 19th century. Buildings in the district include Cape-style houses from the mid-18th century, 19th century commercial and institutional buildings in the town center, and the 1880s summer estate of Lorenzo Dow Baker. The district is roughly bounded by Cross St., Holbrook Ave., Main, E. Main and School Streets, and Duck Creek, and was listed on the National Register of Historic Places in 1989.

== See also ==
- National Register of Historic Places listings in Barnstable County, Massachusetts
