= South Chatham Village Historic District =

Historic district in Massachusetts, United States

- U.S. National Register of Historic Places
- U.S. Historic district
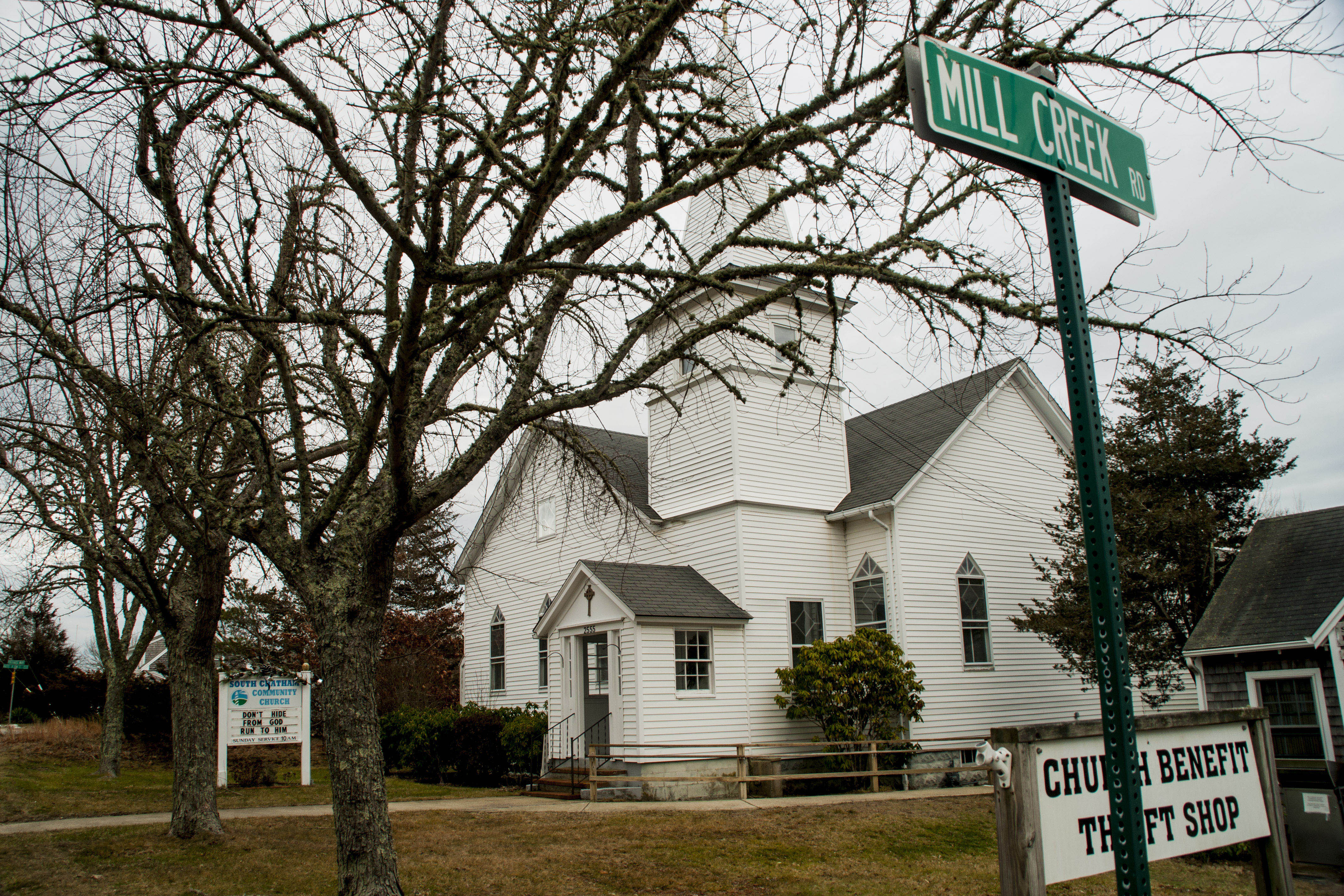
- South Chatham Community Church

- Location within Cape Cod Location within Massachusetts Location within the United States
- Location: Western portion of Main St., and northern portions of Deep Water Ln., Forest Beach Rd., and Pleasant St., Chatham, Massachusetts
- Coordinates: 41°40′44″N 70°1′36″W
- Architectural style: Cape Cod, Greek Revival, Queen Anne
- NRHP reference No.: 100008033
- Added to NRHP: August 29, 2022

The South Chatham Village Historic District is a historic district encompassing much of the linear village of South Chatham in Chatham, Massachusetts. Extending eastward from the Harwich town line along Main Street, the district developed in the 18th and 19th centuries as a maritime and farming village. The district was listed on the National Register of Historic Places in 2022.

== Description and history ==
The South Chatham Village is a largely linear area extending along Main Street (Massachusetts Route 28) between the Harwich line to the west, and Cockle Cove Road to the east. The area contains an architecturally diverse collection of residential, civic, and commercial buildings dating from the 18th to 20th centuries. Unusual in the village are a higher than normal collection of two-story frame residences, in a region otherwise dominated by single-story and 1-1/2 story residential buildings. The historic district also extends for short distances along Pleasant Street and Forest Beech Road.

Main Street was laid out in the 17th century, as the primary road between Chatham and Harwich villages, and remained rural in character until the 19th century. By the mid-19th century the village began to take shape, and its first post office opened in 1862. A small number of Cape Code-style houses survive from the 18th century in the village, which also includes a representation of Greek Revival architecture from its first period of significant growth. Later buildings of architectural significance include the Queen Anne style South Chatham School (built 1903), which marks the eastern end of the district.

== See also ==
- National Register of Historic Places listings in Barnstable County, Massachusetts
