= Waquoit Historic District =

Historic district in Massachusetts, United States

- U.S. National Register of Historic Places
- U.S. Historic district
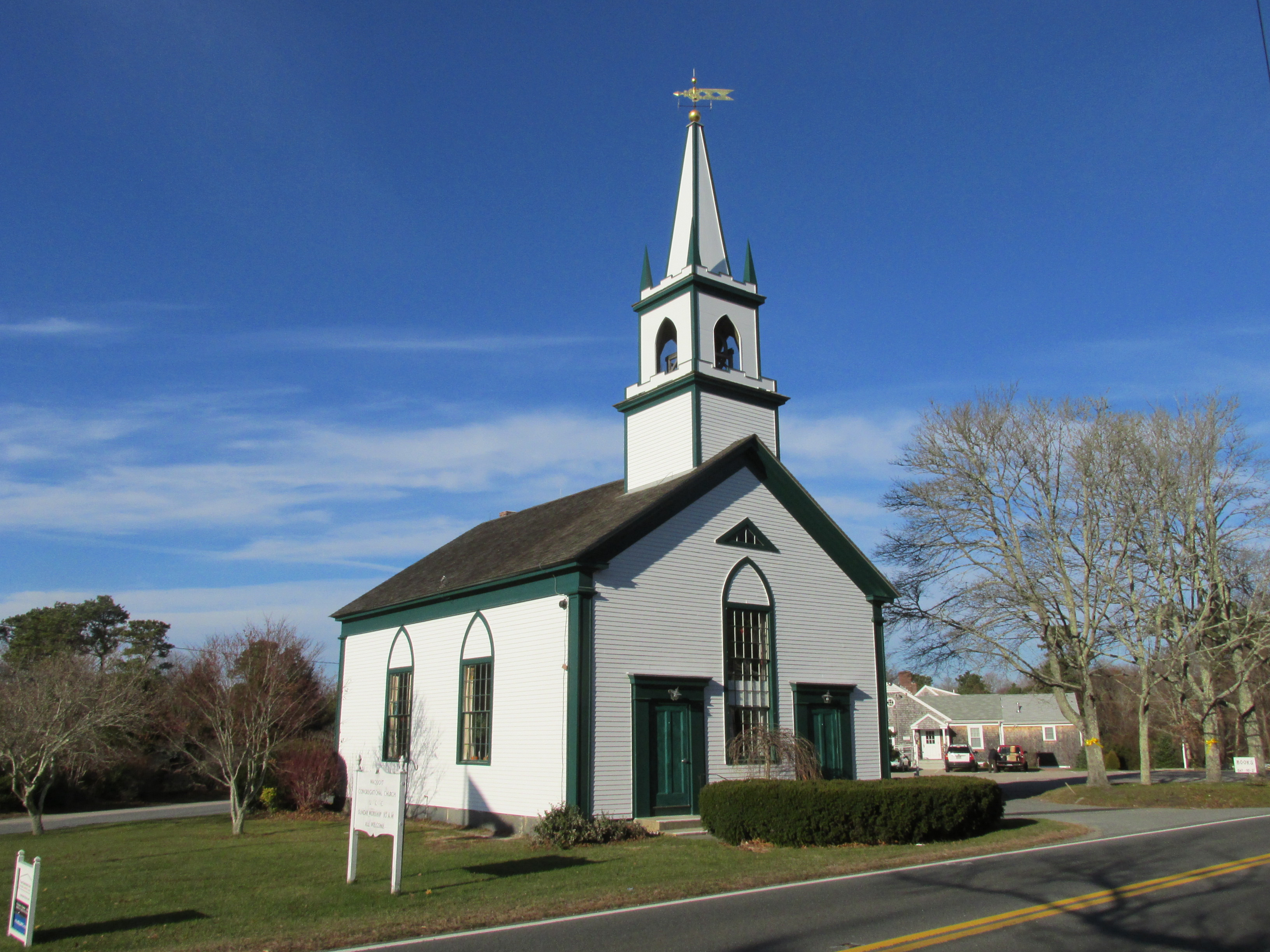
- Waquoit Congregational Church

- Location within Cape Cod Location within Massachusetts Location within the United States
- Location: Falmouth, Massachusetts
- Coordinates: 41°35′8″N 70°31′11″W
- Area: 170 acres (69 ha)
- Architect: Willard, Gilbert; et al.
- Architectural style: Greek Revival
- NRHP reference No.: 04000086
- Added to NRHP: February 26, 2004

The Waquoit Historic District encompasses the historic village center of Waquoit, a village of Falmouth, Massachusetts. Waquoit Village is located in southeastern Falmouth at the head of Waquoit Bay. The district extends along the Waquoit Highway (Massachusetts Route 28) between Childs River Road and Red Brook Road, excluding the section between Parsons Lane and Carriage Shop Road. The latter two roads run through the village center, and the district includes many properties lining those roads as well. The 170-acre (69 ha) district includes 81 predominantly residential properties; it was listed on the National Register of Historic Places in 2004.

== See also ==
- National Register of Historic Places listings in Barnstable County, Massachusetts
