= Universalist Society Meetinghouse =

Historic church in Massachusetts, United States

- U.S. National Register of Historic Places
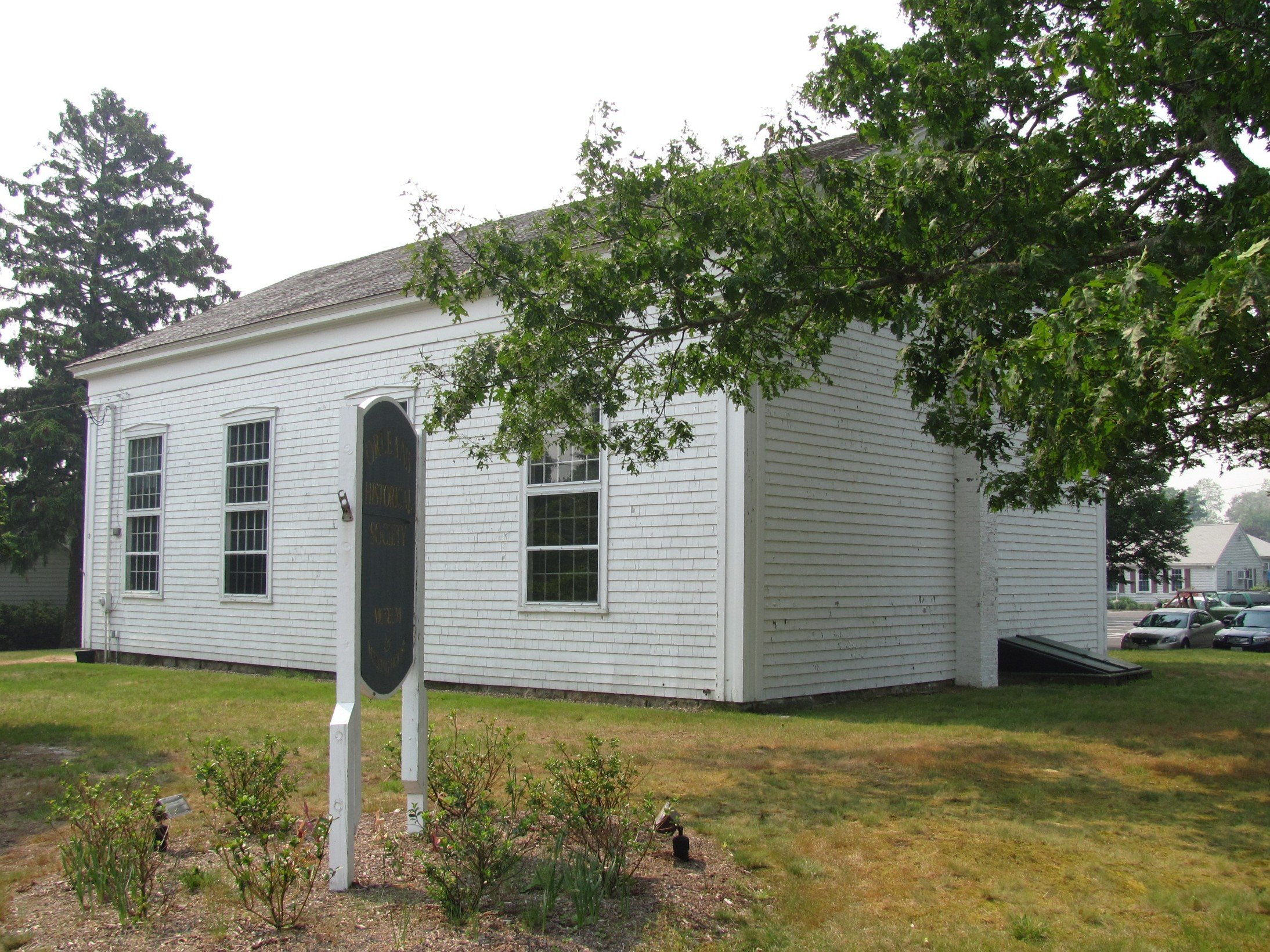
- Universalist Society Meetinghouse

- Location within Cape Cod Location within Massachusetts Location within the United States
- Location: 3 River Road, Orleans, Massachusetts
- Coordinates: 41°46′59″N 69°58′40″W
- Area: less than one acre
- Built: 1834
- Architects: Taylor, David Jr.
- Architectural style: Greek Revival
- NRHP reference No.: 99000186
- Added to NRHP: February 25, 1999

The Universalist Society Meetinghouse is an historic Greek Revival meetinghouse at 3 River Road in Orleans, Massachusetts. Built in 1834, it was the only Universalist church built in Orleans, and is architecturally a well-preserved local example of Greek Revival architecture. The Meeting House is now the home of the Orleans Historical Society and is known as the Meeting House Museum. It was listed on the National Register of Historic Places in 1999.

== Description and history ==
The meetinghouse is set on a short piece of River Road, between Main and School Streets, in the village center of Orleans not far from the town offices. The building is a two-story rectangular wood-frame structure, set on a granite foundation, with a gable roof. The roof ridge runs parallel to River Road, which lies to the north, and the main gable-end facade faces roughly east. The walls are finished with painted wooden shingles, with broad paneled pilasters rising at the corners to an entablature that encircles the building below the roof line. The main facade is symmetrically arranged, with two entrances each flanked by pilasters and topped by an entablature. Above each entrance at the second level is a sash window. The gable end is fully pedimented, with a small lancet-shaped window at the center.

The interior of the building has a single large space, with a balcony gallery on three sides (excepting the west end). The original box pews were removed from the main floor, probably before 1900, with congregants apparently using folding chairs; box pews remain in the gallery. A 19th-century pressed metal ceiling obscures the original domed ceiling. The building now houses museum displays.

The Universalist congregation of Orleans took form as early as 1832, when a number of congregants left the local Congregational Church over their theological differences. The new congregation was formally organized in 1833, and its new meetinghouse was built by David Taylor Jr. on land donated by David Taylor Sr., a former ship's captain and the local postmaster. The building was enlarged sometime in the 19th century by the addition of about 15 feet (4.6 m) to the west end; this probably took place between the 1840s and 1860s, when the congregation was at its largest.

Faced with declining participation, the Universalists and Congregationalists reunited their congregations in 1939, holding services in the Congregational church and using this meetinghouse as a Sunday school. The building was sold to the Orleans Historical Society in 1971.

== See also ==
- National Register of Historic Places listings in Barnstable County, Massachusetts
