= Josiah Tobey House =

Historic house in Massachusetts, United States

- U.S. National Register of Historic Places
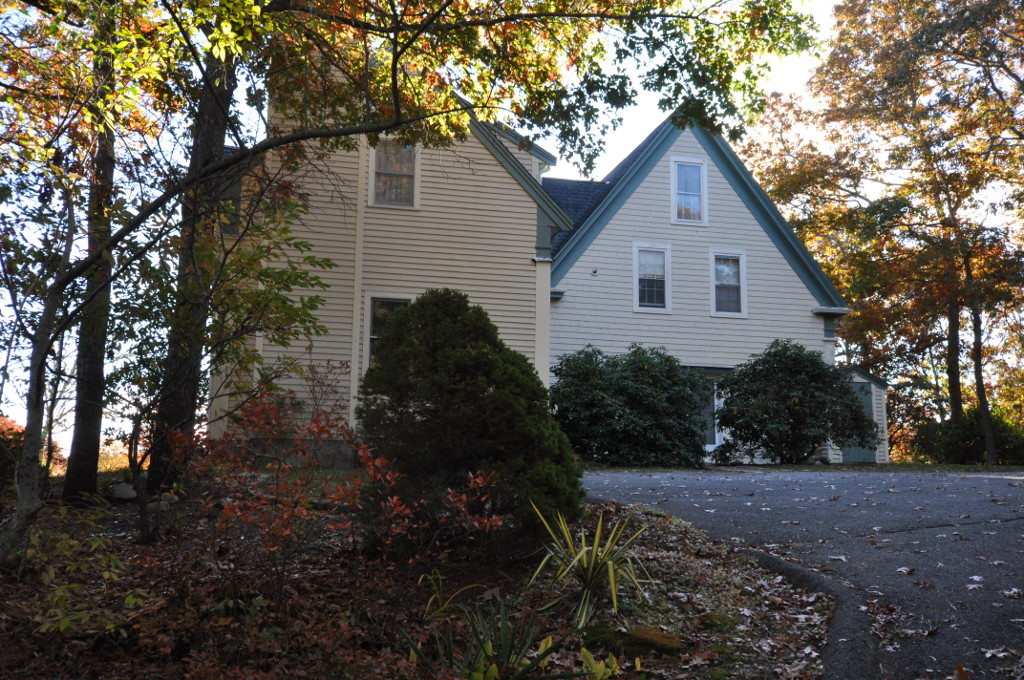
- View of the rear of the house

- Location within Cape Cod Location within Massachusetts
- Location: 67 Oxbow Rd., Falmouth, Massachusetts
- Coordinates: 41°34′41″N 70°34′33″W
- Area: 18.9 acres (7.6 ha)
- Built: 1854
- Architectural style: Greek Revival
- NRHP reference No.: 94001496
- Added to NRHP: December 9, 1994

The Josiah Tobey House was a historic house located at 67 Oxbow Road in Falmouth, Massachusetts.

== Description and history ==
The 1-3/4 story wood-frame house was built in 1854 for Sandwich native Josiah Tobey, whose in-laws owned land in the area. The house is a locally distinctive example of Greek Revival styling, with a Doric porch under a wide and steep gable. The entry is located on the right side of the porch, and has been enclosed between two of the four columns. The two windows under the porch extend from floor to ceiling.

The house was added to the National Register of Historic Places on December 9, 1994. The house was badly damaged by fire in January 2024 and demolished the following year.

== See also ==
- National Register of Historic Places listings in Barnstable County, Massachusetts
