= Poor House and Methodist Cemetery =

Historic burying ground in Falmouth, Barnstable County, Massachusetts

- U.S. National Register of Historic Places
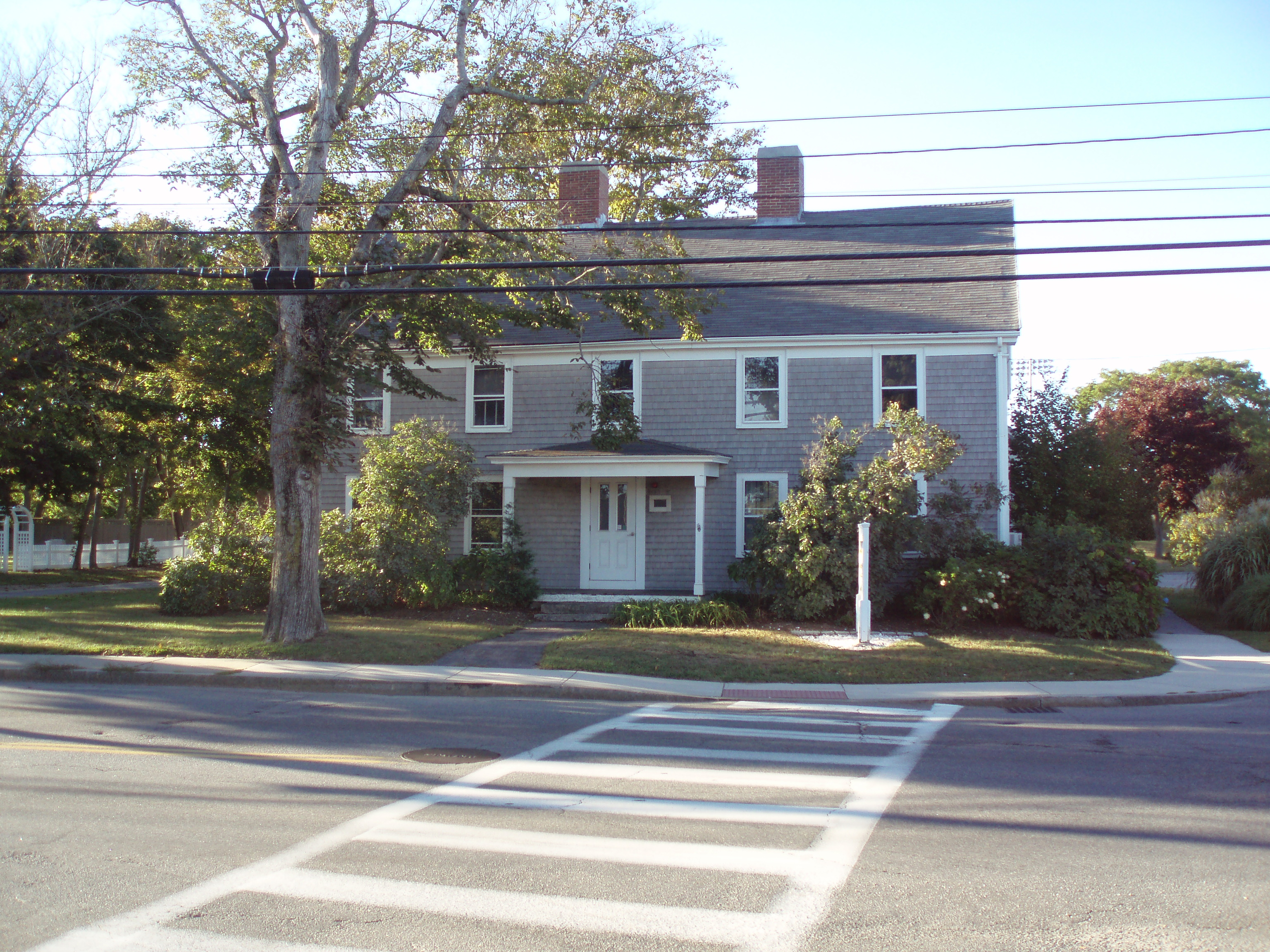
- Falmouth Poor House

- Location within Cape Cod Location within Massachusetts Location within the United States
- Location: Falmouth, Massachusetts
- Coordinates: 41°33′13″N 70°36′13″W
- Architectural style: Georgian
- NRHP reference No.: 98000147
- Added to NRHP: February 26, 1998

The Poor House and Methodist Cemetery (also known as the "Methodist Society Burying Ground", "Falmouth Poor House Burial Ground", "Old Methodist Cemetery", "Falmouth Work House", "Poor Farm", "Town Infirmary", or "Falmouth Artist Colony") is an historic poor house and cemetery on 744 Main Street in Falmouth, Massachusetts. It was established in 1809 and served the poor and mentally ill from 1812 until 1963. The property was added to the National Register of Historic Places in 1998, along with the Methodist Burial Ground next door where many Poor House residents were subsequently buried.

The building is owned by the Town of Falmouth, and is called the Edward Marks Jr. Building. Since 1963, at different points it housed the Falmouth Retirement System and the Falmouth Historical Commission. The building used to be the home of the Falmouth Artists Guild prior to the construction of the Falmouth Art Center. At present it is vacant.

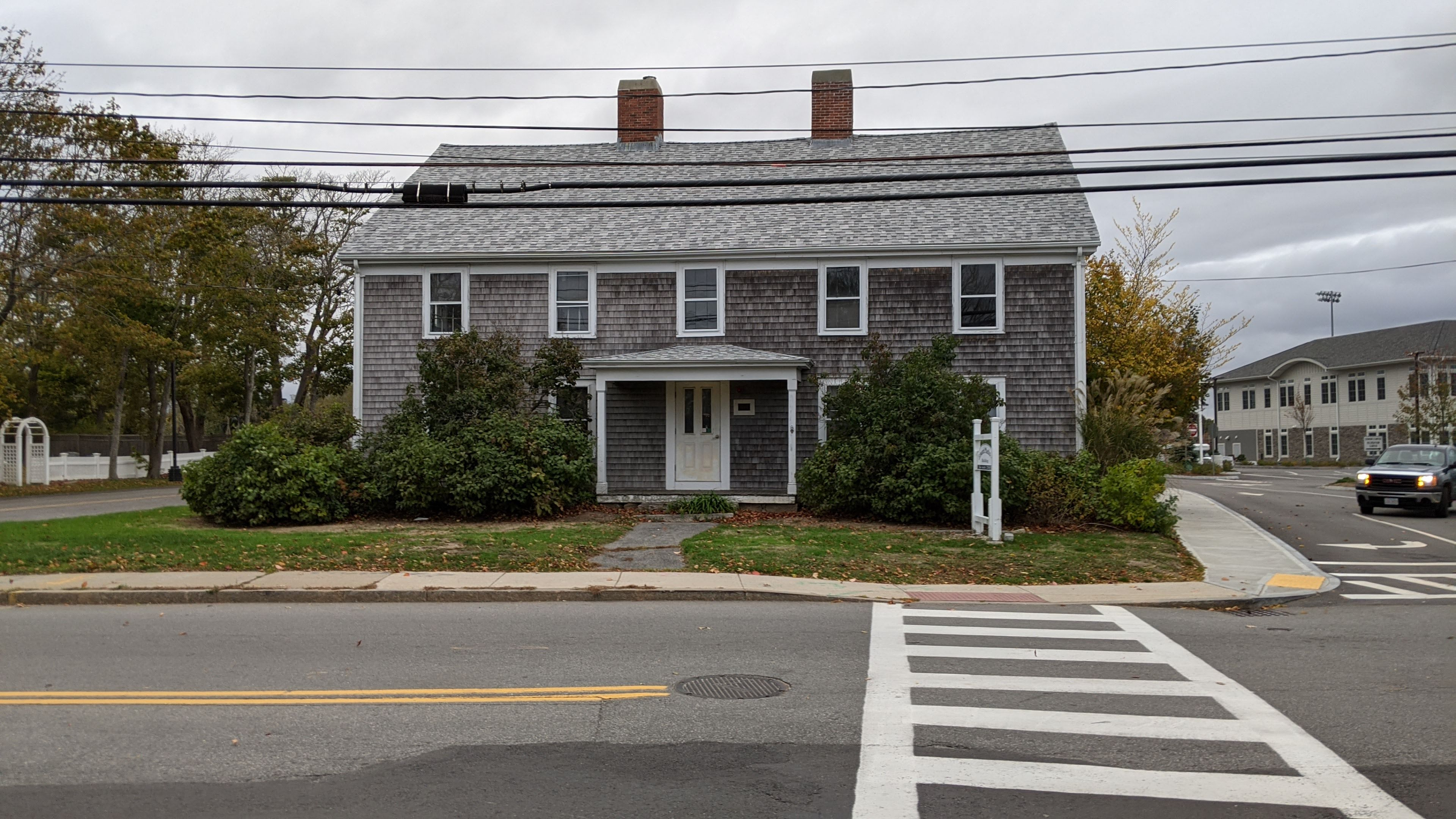
Poor House

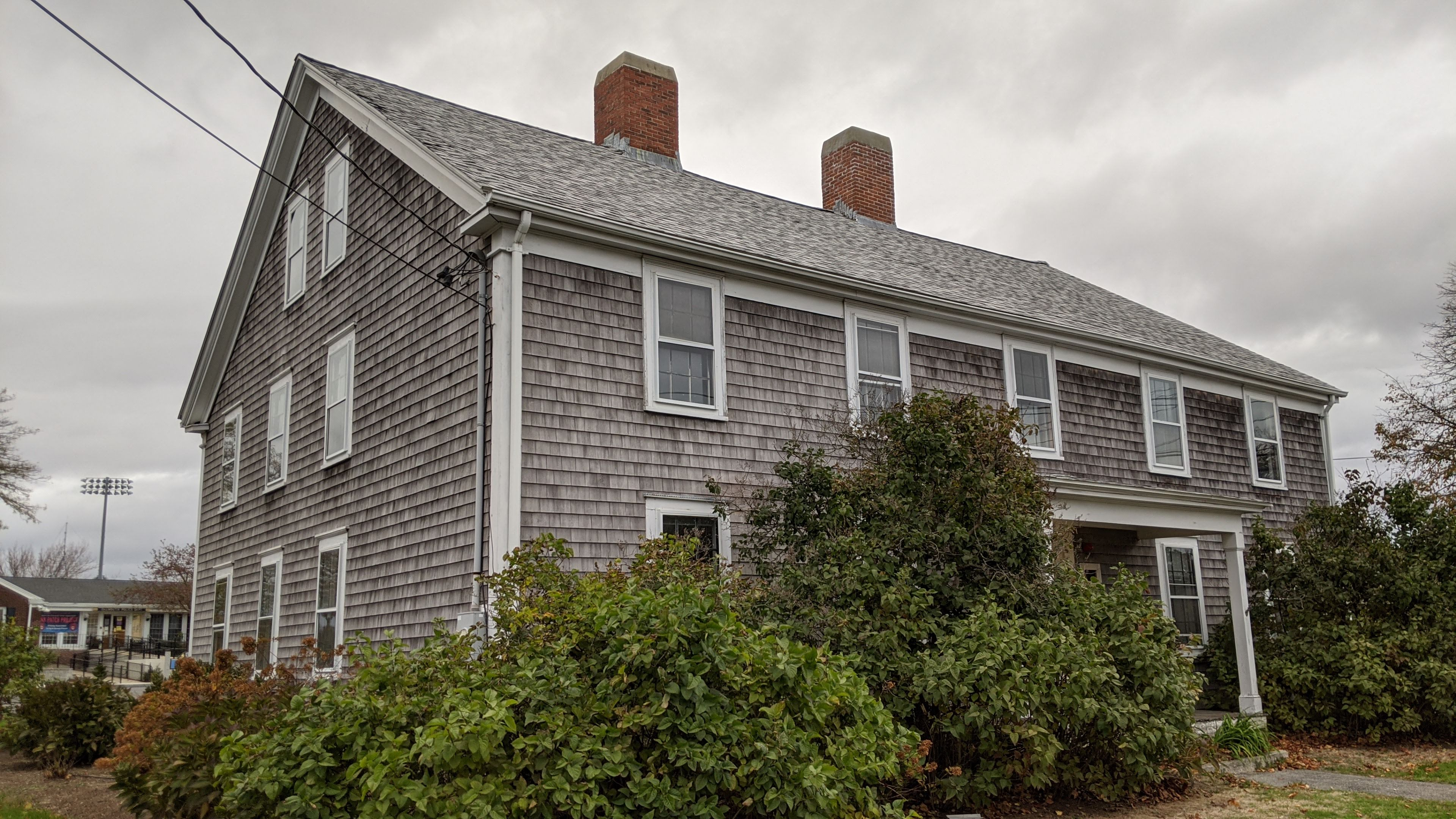
Poor House

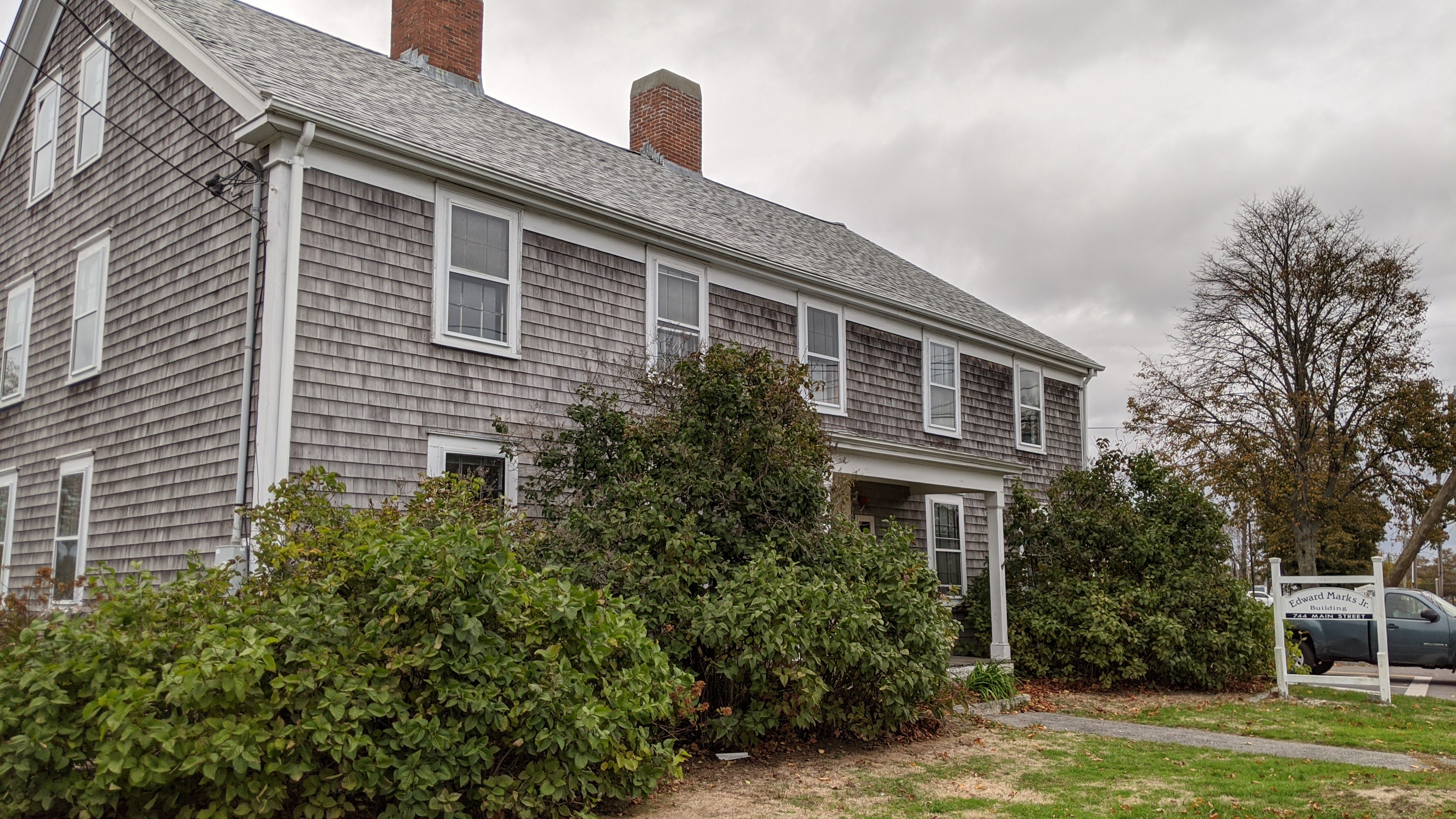
Poor House

== See also ==
- National Register of Historic Places listings in Barnstable County, Massachusetts
