= Old Bourne High School building =

- Bourne High School
- U.S. National Register of Historic Places
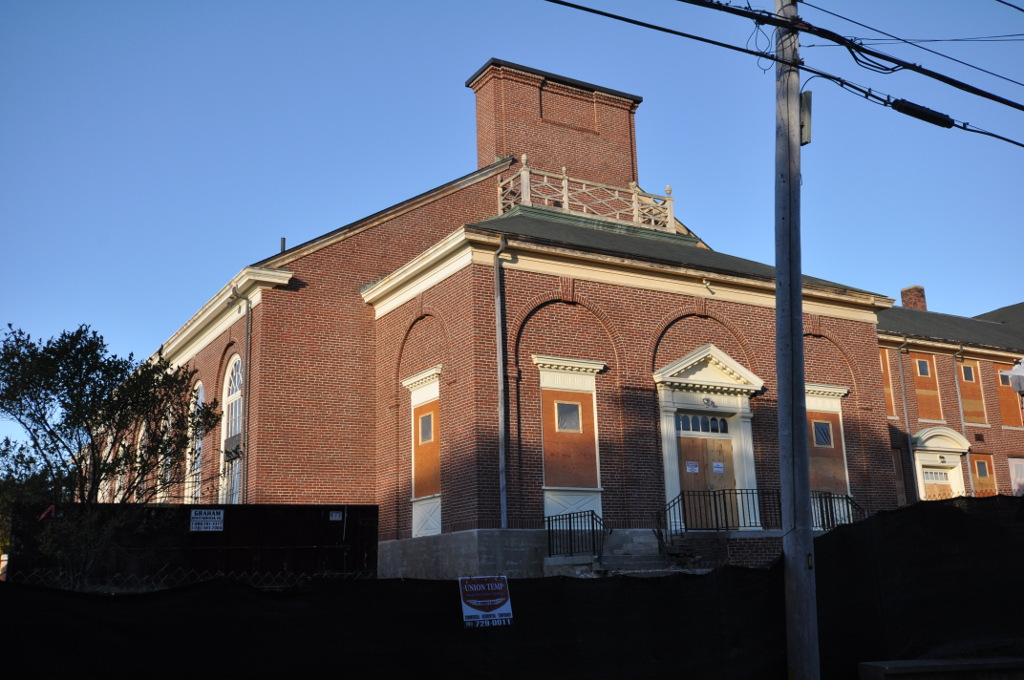

- Location within Cape Cod Location within Massachusetts Location within the United States
- Location: 85 Cotuit Road, Bourne, Massachusetts
- Coordinates: 41°44′31″N 70°35′41″W
- Built: 1905
- Architectural style: Classical Revival
- NRHP reference No.: 13000035
- Added to NRHP: February 27, 2013

The old Bourne High School is a historic school building at 85 Old Cotuit Road in Bourne, Massachusetts. Built in 1905 and enlarged in 1937, it is a prominent local example of Colonial Revival architecture. Most recently used by the town as the Kempton J. Coady Jr. Junior High School, it was by the local Waldorf school, and is now being converted to residences. It was listed on the National Register of Historic Places in 2013.

== Description and history ==
The former Bourne High School building stands in Bourne Village on the south side of the Cape Cod Canal on the west side of Cotuit Road between Sandwich and Trowbridge Roads. The building consists of two large brick blocks joined by a wide two-story hyphen. The main block, two stories in height and covered by a hip roof, is oriented to face east, toward Sandwich Road and the canal. It has a seven-bay facade, with a project center section topped by a pedimented gable. This section houses classrooms. The hyphen joins this to a gymnasium and auditorium wing that is one tall story in height, with round-arch windows and an entrance vestibule with round-arch panels containing large sash windows on either side of a pedimented entry.

The main portion of the building was constructed in 1905 to a design by the Boston architectural firm of Parker and Thomas. The building was significantly damaged by fire in 1934, but was repaired and additional facilities, including the auditorium wing, were added. The proper also benefited at that time from improvements funded through the federal Works Progress Administration jobs program. The building served as Bourne's high school until 1960, and then served as the Kempton J. Coady Jr., Junior High School until 1990. In 1992 it was taken over by the local Waldorf school. In 2009–2010, the Waldorf School moved to Cotuit. The building sat vacant for several years, until it was taken over by the Coady School Residences, which extensively renovated the building.

== See also ==
- National Register of Historic Places listings in Barnstable County, Massachusetts
