= Forestdale School (Massachusetts) =

- U.S. National Register of Historic Places
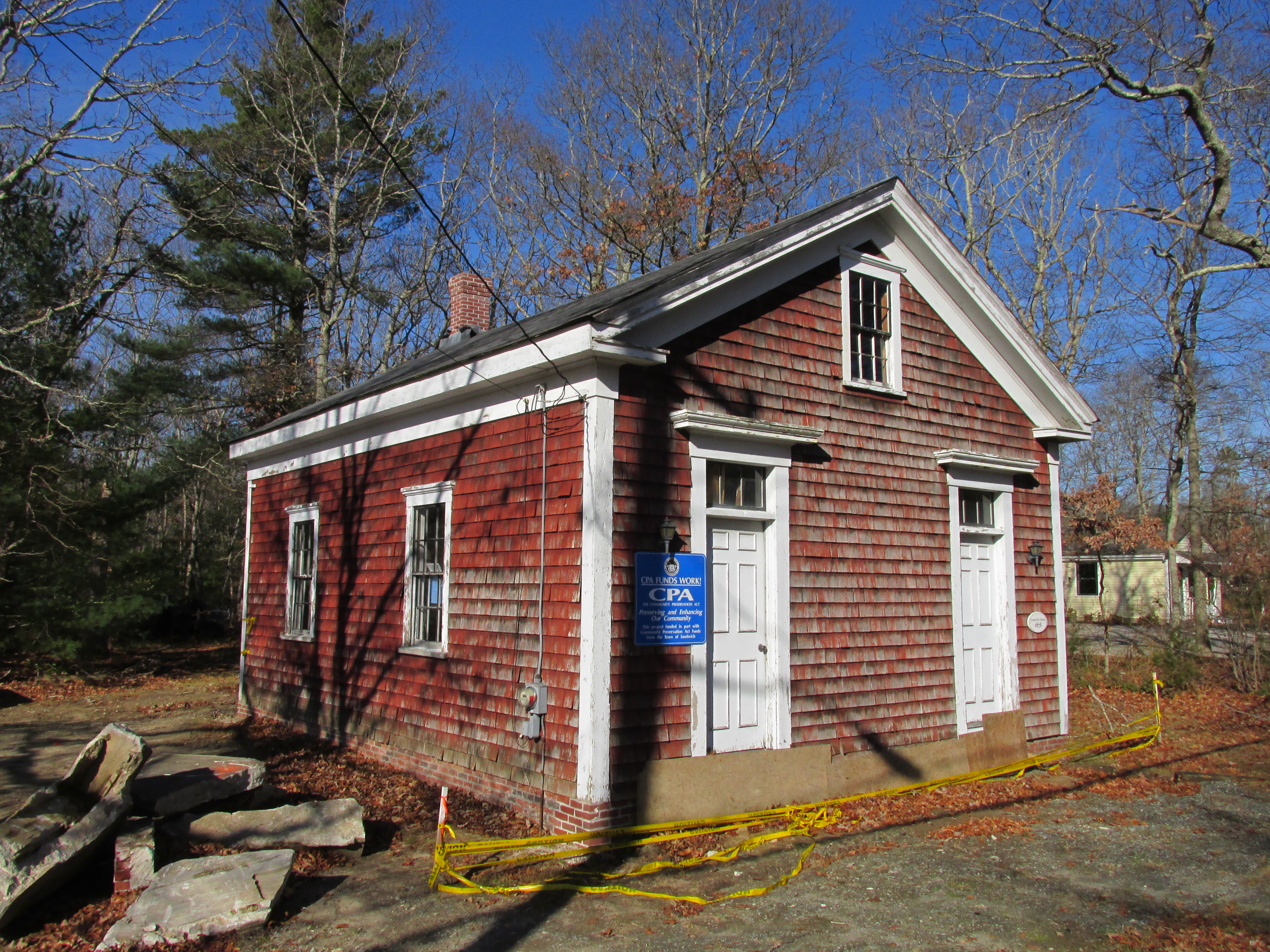
- Greenville School

- Location within Cape Cod Location within Massachusetts Location within the United States
- Location: Sandwich, Massachusetts
- Coordinates: 41°41′15″N 70°30′16″W
- Area: less than one acre
- Built: 1878
- Architect: Meiggs, Charles W.H.
- Architectural style: Greek Revival
- NRHP reference No.: 97000469
- Added to NRHP: June 6, 1997

The Forestdale School, also known as the Greenville School, is a historic one-room school building at 87 Falmouth-Sandwich Road (Massachusetts Route 130) in Sandwich, Massachusetts. The single story wood-frame structure was built in 1878, and is one of a small number of surviving district school buildings on Cape Cod. It has Greek Revival features, including gable end returns, and transom windows over the two entrances. The building was listed on the National Register of Historic Places in 1997.

== Description and history ==
The Forestdale School is set on the west side of Massachusetts Route 130, close to the road, just north of the Forestdale Fire Station. It is a small single-story wood-frame structure, with a front-facing gable roof, wooden shingle siding, and a brick foundation covered in concrete. A small ell of early 20th-century date extends the building to the rear. The main facade, facing the street, has two symmetrically placed entrances, each surmounted by a transom window and a projecting cornice. A single sash window is placed centrally in the gable. The side elevations each have two sash windows. The main block has two small vestibule areas, which open into the large classroom area; the rear ell is taken up by a kitchen and bathrooms. The main room has retained its original wainscoting.

The school was built in 1878 to serve the predominantly agricultural Forestdale area of Sandwich, which was known as Greenville prior to 1887. Of 21 district schools built by the town in the 19th century, it is the least-altered one to survive. The school was operated until 1927, when the district schools were consolidated into a single graded school. It was then leased by the town to the Forestdale Men's Club, which met in the building until the 1960s. After undergoing restoration, it was briefly used as a branch library, preschool, and dancing school. Since 1980 it has been used by local Boy Scouts as a meeting space.

== See also ==
- National Register of Historic Places listings in Barnstable County, Massachusetts
