= Harwich Historic District =

Historic district in Massachusetts, United States

- U.S. National Register of Historic Places
- U.S. Historic district
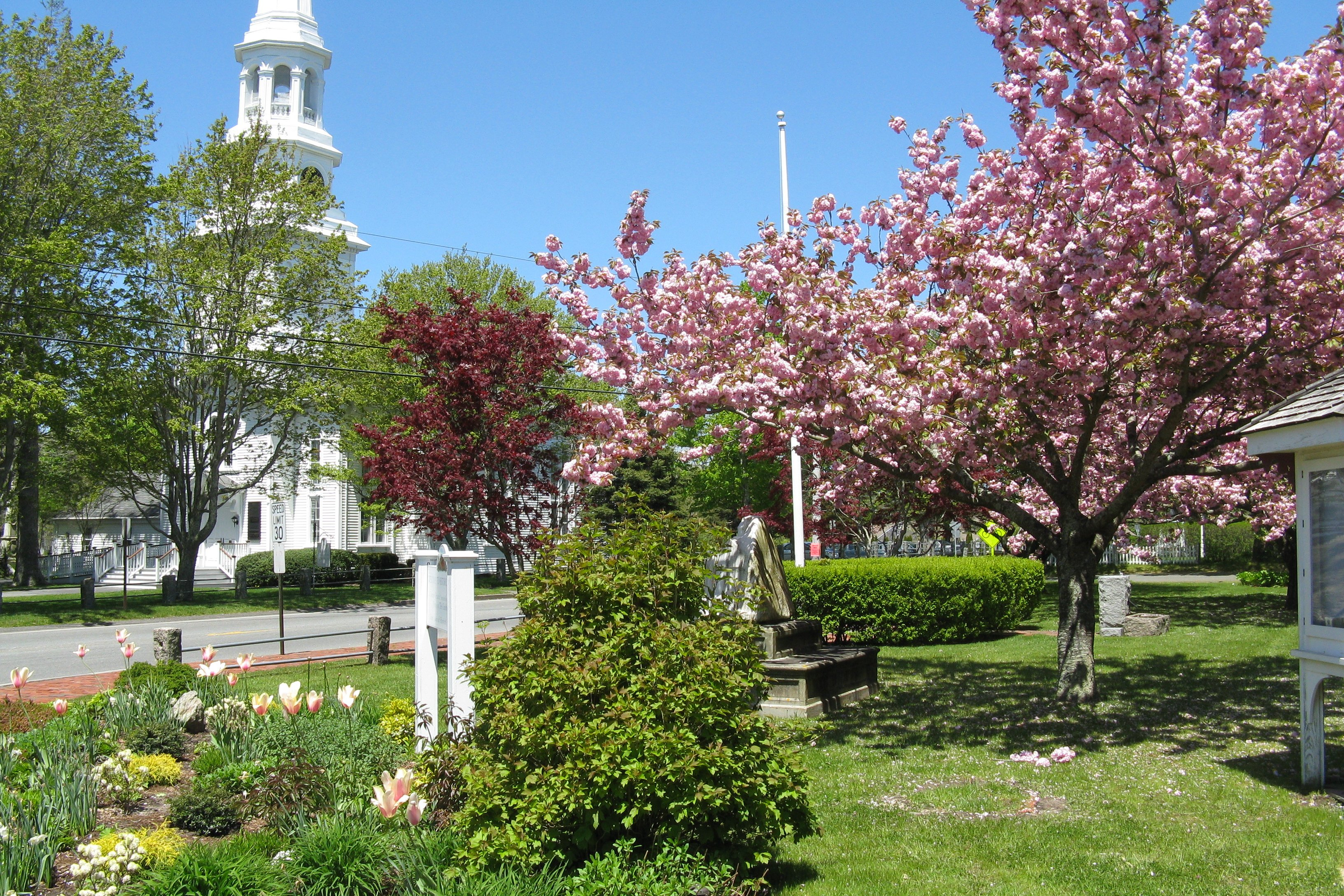
- Harwich Center

- Location within Cape Cod Location within Massachusetts Location within the United States
- Location: Harwich, Massachusetts
- Coordinates: 41°41′9″N 70°4′16″W
- Area: 55 acres (22 ha)
- Architect: Luther and Calvin Gifford
- Architectural style: Greek Revival, Italianate
- NRHP reference No.: 75000245
- Added to NRHP: February 24, 1975

The Harwich Historic District is a historic district encompassing the historic portions of the Harwich Center village of Harwich, Massachusetts. The village, originally known as Broadbrooks after a prominent local family, was developed beginning in the 18th century, and features a high quality concentration of Greek Revival and Italianate architecture. It extends along Main and Parallel Streets between the cemetery in the west and Brooks Park in the east. It was listed on the National Register of Historic Places in 1975.

== Description and history ==
The area that is now Harwich was settled in the 17th century as part of Yarmouth, and was separately incorporated in 1694. Part of the area that is now Harwich Center was settled by members of the Broadbrooks family, who later shortened their name to Brooks. This family became one of the leading forces in the civic and economic development of the village, building at least eight of its buildings. Brooks Park, at the eastern end of the village, is where the 1732 homestead of Ebenezer Broadbrooks was located; no longer standing, its site is marked by millstones from his mill that are placed near the park entrance. Sidney Brooks founded what eventually became known as the Brooks Academy in 1844; its Greek Revival building later served as the town high school. Sidney's brother Henry donated funds for the construction of the village library.

The historic district is primarily defined by Main Street, extending east-west between the cemetery to the west and Brooks Park to the east. The aptly named Parallel Street runs south of Main Street, and is joined to it by a number of smaller side streets. The village has a rural feel due to open spaces and narrow side streets. Most of the buildings in the district are of wood frame construction, and are Greek Revival or Italianate in style, reflecting their mid-19th century construction period. The village's most prominent building is the First Congregational Church, built in 1832 in the Greek Revival style, but altered in 1854 in a more Italianate Renaissance Revival style.

== See also ==
- National Register of Historic Places listings in Harwich, Massachusetts
