= Chase Library =

- U.S. National Register of Historic Places
- Location within Cape Cod Location within Massachusetts Location within the United States
- Location: 7 Main St., Harwich, Massachusetts
- Coordinates: 41°40′08″N 70°7′17″W
- Built: 1911
- Architectural style: Colonial Revival
- NRHP reference No.: 14001094
- Added to NRHP: December 29, 2014

Chase Library is the public library of West Harwich, Massachusetts. It is located in a small architecturally distinguished Colonial Revival building constructed in 1911. Efforts to build a library in West Harwich began in 1901, and reached fruition in 1906, with the gift of the home of Caleb Chase, a Harwich native who was son of a major local shipowner and shipbuilder and a successful businessman in his own right. The house, however, was not suitable for housing a library, so Dr. John Nickerson donated a corner of his large property that was near Chase's house for the purpose, and the present building, a small three-bay wood frame hip-roof building was constructed there.

The library building was listed on the National Register of Historic Places in 2014.

== See also ==
- National Register of Historic Places listings in Harwich, Massachusetts
