= Falmouth, Massachusetts =

- Town
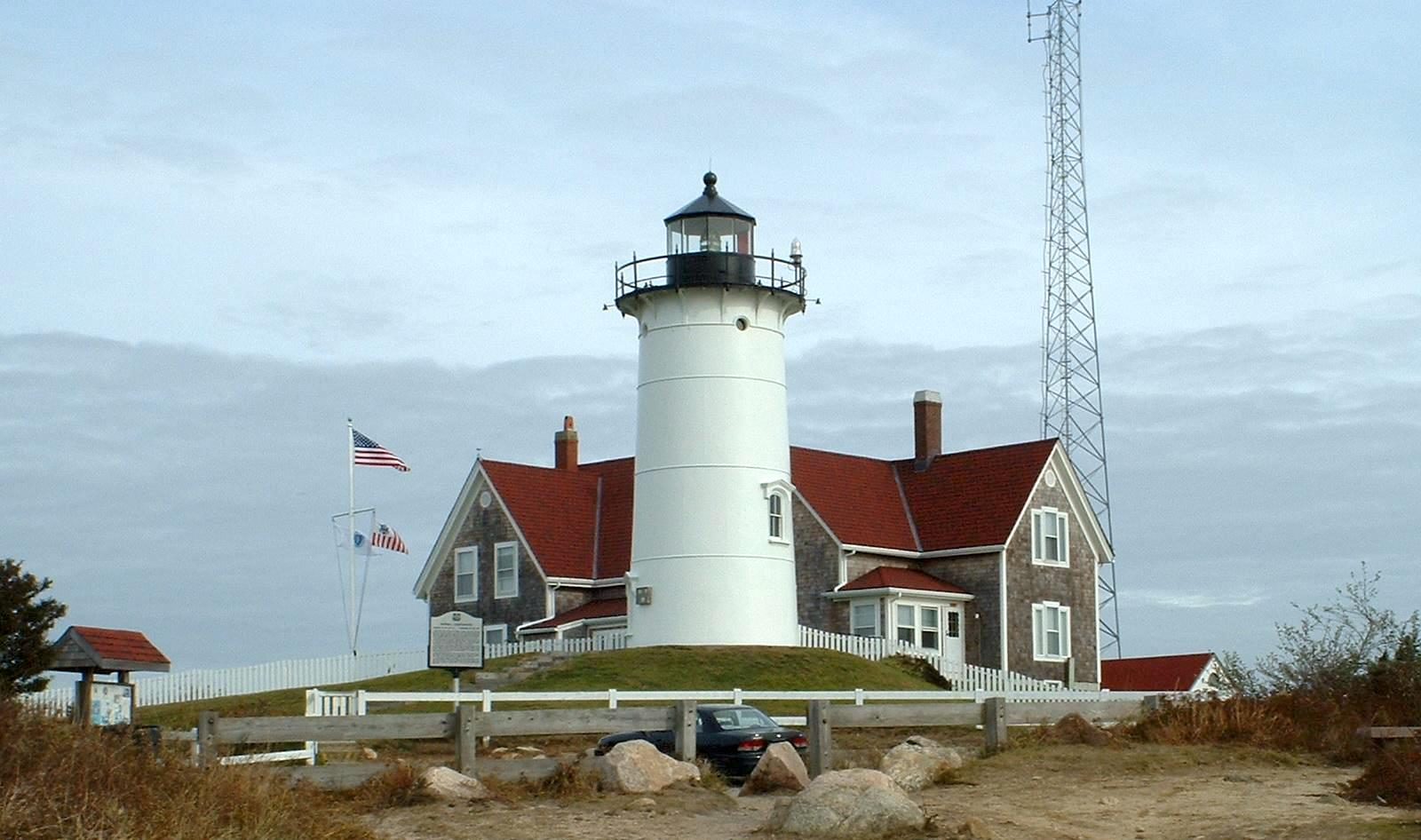
- Nobska Lighthouse, Falmouth

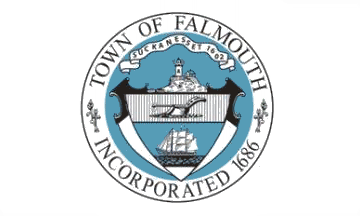
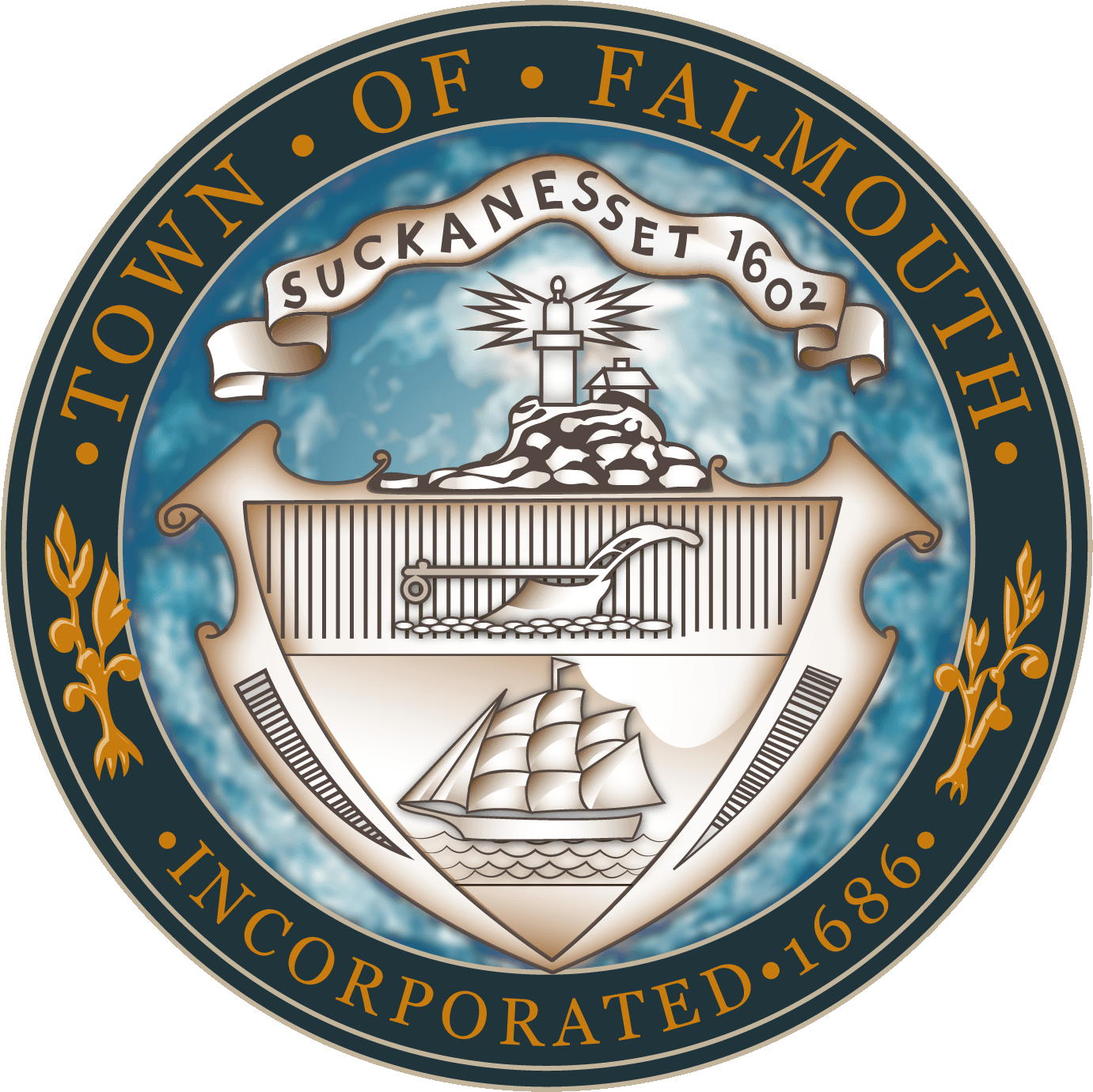
- Flag Seal

- Location in Barnstable County and the state of Massachusetts.
- Coordinates: 41°33′05″N 70°36′55″W
- Country: United States
- State: Massachusetts
- County: Barnstable
- Settled: 1660
- Incorporated: 1686

Government
  - Type: Representative town meeting
  - Town Administrator: Mike Renshaw

Area
  - Total: 54.4 sq mi (141.0 km^{2})
  - Land: 44.1 sq mi (114.1 km^{2})
  - Water: 10.3 sq mi (26.8 km^{2})
- Elevation: 9.8 ft (3 m)

Population (2020)
  - Total: 32,517
  - Density: 740/sq mi (285/km^{2})
- Time zone: UTC-5 (Eastern)
  - Summer (DST): UTC-4 (Eastern)
- ZIP Codes: 02536 (East Falmouth); 02540 (Falmouth); 02543 (Woods Hole); 02556 (North Falmouth)
- Area code: 508 / 774
- FIPS code: 25-23105
- GNIS feature ID: 0618253
- Website: www.falmouthma.gov

Falmouth (/ˈfælməθ/ FAL-məth) is a town on Cape Cod in Massachusetts. The population was 32,517 at the 2020 census, making Falmouth the second-largest municipality on Cape Cod after Barnstable. The terminal for the Steamship Authority ferries to Martha's Vineyard is located in the village of Woods Hole in Falmouth. Woods Hole also contains several scientific organizations such as the Woods Hole Oceanographic Institution (WHOI), the Marine Biological Laboratory (MBL), the Woodwell Climate Research Center, NOAA's Woods Hole Science Aquarium, and the scientific institutions' various museums.

For geographic and demographic information on specific parts of the town of Falmouth, please see the articles on East Falmouth, Falmouth Village, North Falmouth, Teaticket, West Falmouth, and Woods Hole. Falmouth also encompasses the villages of Hatchville and Waquoit, which are not census-designated places and fall within the village of East Falmouth based on postal service.

== History ==
Falmouth was first settled by English colonists in 1660 and was officially incorporated in 1686. Bartholomew Gosnold named the settlement after Falmouth, Cornwall, England, his home port. Early principal activities were farming, salt works, shipping, whaling, and sheep husbandry, which was very popular due to the introduction of Merino sheep and the beginnings of water-powered mills that could process the wool. In 1837, Falmouth averaged about 50 sheep per square mile.

In 1779 Woods Hole was raided by British Marines and Sailors, which led to the Town militia attacking the British, and the next morning this attack led to a five hour battle, which the Militia won by creating a fort on what is now Surf Drive Beach, fending off the British landing parties.

Falmouth also saw brief action in the War of 1812, when the area around Falmouth Heights, on its southern coast, was bombarded by several British frigates and ships of the line, and Massachusetts militia hastily entrenched themselves on the beaches to repulse a possible British landing which never came. By 1872, the train had come to Falmouth and Woods Hole, and some of the first summer homes were established. By the late 19th century, cranberries were being cultivated and strawberries were being raised for the Boston market. Large-scale dairying was tried in the early 20th century in interior regions. After the improvement in highways, and due in part to the heavy use of neighboring Camp Edwards (now part of Joint Base Cape Cod) during World War II, population growth increased significantly. Large homebuilding booms occurred in the 1970s, followed by others in the 1980s and 1990s.

In the late 1800s, after railroad service was established between Boston and Cape Cod, James Madison Beebe bought over 700 acres (280 ha) and built Highfield Hall, which is now a museum, and much of the land is preserved as Beebe Woods. In 1965, Robert Manry sailed from Falmouth aboard his 13.5-foot (4.1 m) sailboat and reached Falmouth, Great Britain, 78 days later.

=== Historic districts ===
The town of Falmouth has seven historic districts, including four on the National Register of Historic Places:

- Falmouth Village Green
- North Falmouth Village
- Waquoit
- West Falmouth Village

The other three historic districts are in Woods Hole, Davisville, and Quissett.

In addition to the historic districts, Falmouth has ten individual sites on the National Register:

- Central Fire Station
- Crowell-Bourne Farm
- Elnathan Nye House
- Falmouth Pumping Station
- Josiah Tobey House
- Lawrence Academy
- Nobska Light
- Poor House and Methodist Cemetery
- Teaticket School
- Woods Hole School

Offshore Falmouth in Buzzards Bay, Cleveland East Ledge Light is listed with the National Register.

== Geography ==
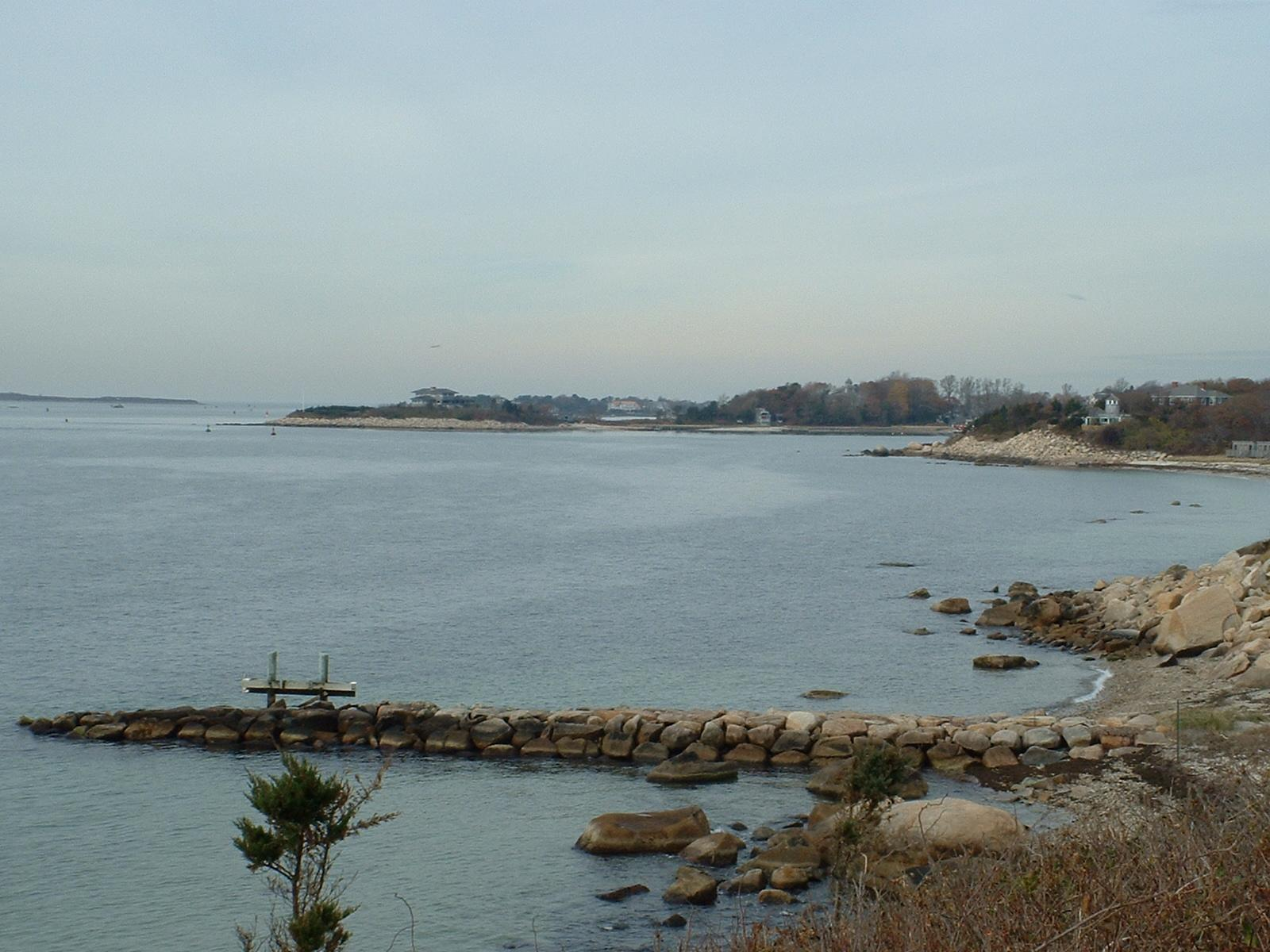
Juniper Point, the eastern point of Woods Hole in Falmouth

According to the United States Census Bureau, the town has a total area of 54.4 square miles (141.0 km^{2}), of which 44.1 square miles (114.1 km^{2}) is land and 10.3 square miles (26.8 km^{2}), or 19.04%, is water. Most of Falmouth, like the rest of Cape Cod, sits on glacial sands composed of glacial outwash deposits. However, the soil in the southwestern part of the town, consisting of moraine deposits, is more rocky and dense, like the rest of New England, and many glacial erratics are scattered about, having been dropped by the retreating glaciers. The climate is temperate marine. There is no exposed bedrock. Rainfall is evenly distributed throughout the year and averages 2 to 3 in (51 to 76 mm) per month.

Falmouth lies on the southwestern tip of Cape Cod. It is bordered by Bourne and Sandwich to the north, Mashpee to the east, Vineyard Sound to the south, and Buzzards Bay to the west. At its closest point, Falmouth is approximately 560 yards (510 m) from Nonamesset Island, the easternmost island of the town of Gosnold and the Elizabeth Islands. It is approximately 3 1/3 miles (5.4 km) north-northwest of Martha's Vineyard, the closest land to the island. Falmouth is approximately 14 miles (23 km) south of the Bourne Bridge, 22 miles (35 km) west of Barnstable, and 77 miles (124 km) south-southeast of Boston.

Falmouth's topography is similar to the rest of Cape Cod's, with many small ponds, creeks, and inlets surrounded by the pines and oaks of the Cape and often rocky beachfront. Falmouth's southern shore is notable for a series of ponds and rivers spaced very closely together, all of which travel some distance into the town. These include, from west to east, Falmouth Inner Harbor, Little Pond, Great Pond (which leads to the Dexter and Coonamesset rivers), Green Pond, Bourne's Pond, Eel Pond (which leads to the Childs River), and Waquoit Bay, which lies along the Mashpee town line. The Buzzards Bay side of the town is primarily bays divided by necks, peninsulas connected to land by isthmi. The largest inlet is Megansett Cove along the Bourne town line. The Buzzards Bay shore of Falmouth is punctuated by a number of hamlets, including, from north to south, Megansett, New Silver Beach, Old Silver, Chappaquoit, Sippewisset, Quissett, and Woods Hole.

The highest point in Falmouth is Telegraph Hill, also called Falmouth Hill, at an elevation of 157 feet.

== Climate ==
According to the Köppen climate classification system, Falmouth, Massachusetts has a warm-summer, wet year round, humid continental climate (Dfb). Dfb climates are characterized by at least one month having an average mean temperature ≤ 32.0 °F (≤ 0.0 °C), at least four months with an average mean temperature ≥ 50.0 °F (≥ 10.0 °C), all months with an average mean temperature ≤ 71.6 °F (≤ 22.0 °C), and no significant precipitation difference between seasons. The average seasonal (Nov–Apr) snowfall total is approximately 30 inches (76 cm). The average snowiest month is February, which corresponds with the annual peak in nor'easter activity. According to the United States Department of Agriculture, the plant hardiness zone is 7a, with an average annual extreme minimum air temperature of 1.3 °F (−17.1 °C).

Climate data for Falmouth, Barnstable County, Massachusetts (1981–2010 averages)
Month	Jan	Feb	Mar	Apr	May	Jun	Jul	Aug	Sep	Oct	Nov	Dec	Year
Mean daily maximum °F (°C)	38.1 (3.4)	39.8 (4.3)	45.2 (7.3)	54.2 (12.3)	63.4 (17.4)	72.6 (22.6)	78.5 (25.8)	78.1 (25.6)	72.0 (22.2)	62.3 (16.8)	53.4 (11.9)	43.7 (6.5)	58.5 (14.7)
Daily mean °F (°C)	30.5 (−0.8)	32.2 (0.1)	37.7 (3.2)	46.3 (7.9)	55.5 (13.1)	65.1 (18.4)	71.2 (21.8)	70.7 (21.5)	64.1 (17.8)	54.2 (12.3)	45.7 (7.6)	36.2 (2.3)	50.9 (10.5)
Mean daily minimum °F (°C)	21.0 (−6.1)	22.9 (−5.1)	28.9 (−1.7)	37.7 (3.2)	47.0 (8.3)	57.0 (13.9)	63.4 (17.4)	62.6 (17.0)	55.3 (12.9)	44.7 (7.1)	36.2 (2.3)	26.8 (−2.9)	42.1 (5.6)
Average precipitation inches (mm)	4.11 (104)	3.57 (91)	5.20 (132)	4.50 (114)	3.52 (89)	3.78 (96)	3.35 (85)	3.92 (100)	3.91 (99)	4.23 (107)	4.53 (115)	4.52 (115)	49.14 (1,248)
Average relative humidity (%)	68.6	67.9	66.4	66.9	70.3	73.7	75.6	75.6	75.2	71.8	69.8	69.5	71.0
Average dew point °F (°C)	21.4 (−5.9)	22.8 (−5.1)	27.5 (−2.5)	35.9 (2.2)	46.0 (7.8)	56.5 (13.6)	63.1 (17.3)	62.6 (17.0)	56.1 (13.4)	45.3 (7.4)	36.4 (2.4)	27.2 (−2.7)	41.8 (5.4)
Source: PRISM Climate Group

== Ecology ==
According to the A. W. Kuchler U.S. Potential natural vegetation Types, Falmouth, Massachusetts would primarily contain a Northeastern Oak/Pine (110) vegetation type with a Southern Mixed Forest (26) vegetation form.

== Transportation ==
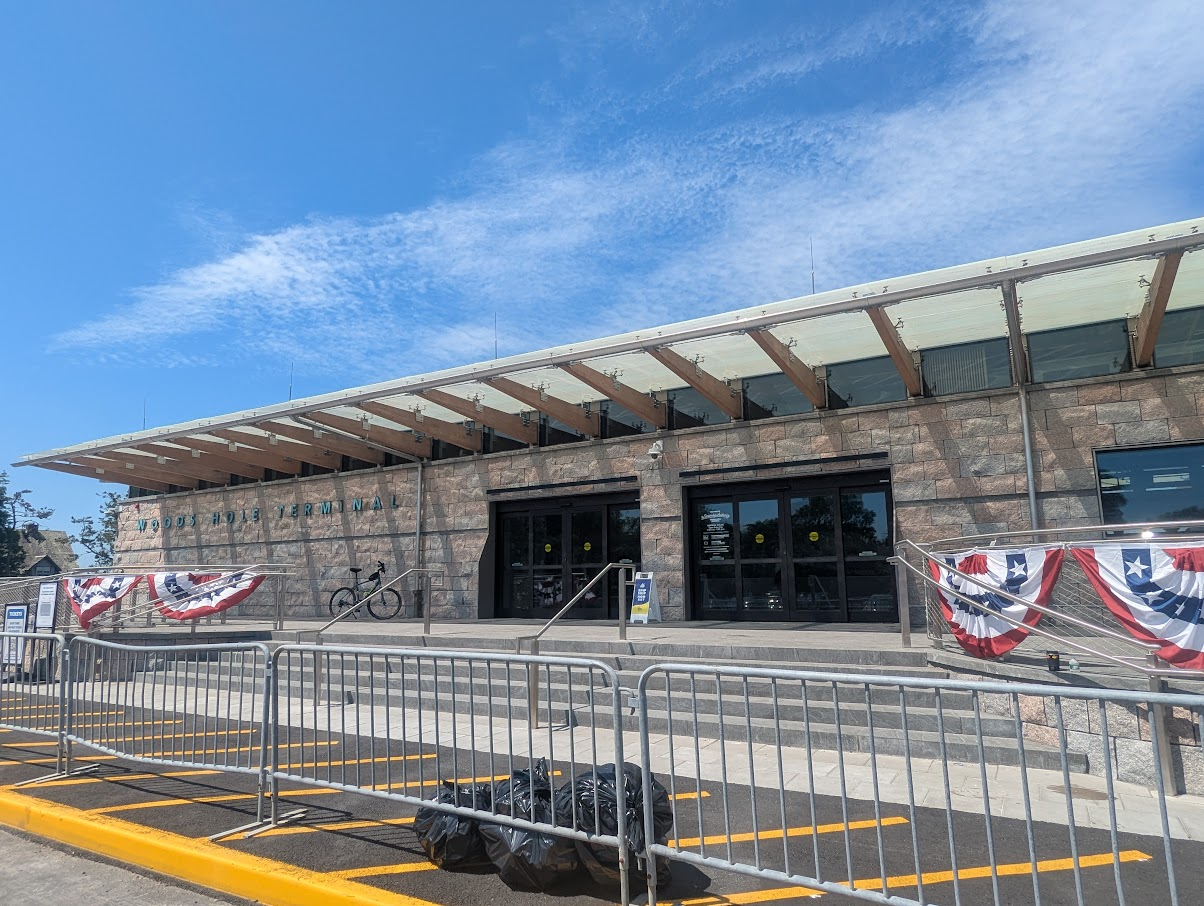
Woods Hole Terminus of the Steamship Authority; the current building (pictured) opened in 2026

Falmouth's main road is Massachusetts Route 28, which runs south from Bourne as a divided highway, then becomes a surface road and heads east through downtown as Main Street, then turns northeast through East Falmouth before crossing into Mashpee. As one of two major east–west routes on the Cape, Route 28 is regularly congested, and there is minimal room for widening opportunities. Route 151 runs east–west through the northern section of the town, connecting North Falmouth and Hatchville with Mashpee.

Falmouth is home to The Woods Hole, Martha's Vineyard and Nantucket Steamship Authority. Daily ferry service brings tourists, residents and supplies from Woods Hole to Nantucket and Martha's Vineyard. It is the main ferry line between the Vineyard and the mainland (as Nantucket is further east, its main line leaves Hyannis). A seasonal ferry, the Island Queen, runs from Falmouth Harbor to Martha's Vineyard.

The Massachusetts Coastal Railroad provides rail freight service to North Falmouth, where a spur runs into Otis Air Base to serve a trash transfer station. The nearest inter-city (Amtrak) passenger rail stations are Providence and Boston's South Station. The nearest MBTA Commuter Rail stations are Middleborough and Kingston.

There is a private air park in East Falmouth, and the nearest national and international air service is at Logan International Airport in Boston and T. F. Green Airport near Providence, both being about equidistant from Falmouth. There is a regional airport in nearby Hyannis.

Falmouth is also served by the Cape Cod Regional Transit Authority bus routes.

== Demographics ==
Historical population
Year	Pop.	±%
1790	1,637	—
1850	2,621	+60.1%
1860	2,456	−6.3%
1870	2,237	−8.9%
1880	2,422	+8.3%
1890	2,567	+6.0%
1900	3,500	+36.3%
1910	3,144	−10.2%
1920	3,500	+11.3%
1930	4,821	+37.7%
1940	6,878	+42.7%
1950	8,662	+25.9%
1960	13,037	+50.5%
1970	15,942	+22.3%
1980	23,640	+48.3%
1990	27,960	+18.3%
2000	32,660	+16.8%
2010	31,531	−3.5%
2020	32,517	+3.1%
2024*	33,227	+2.2%
* = population estimate. Source: United States census records and Population Estimates Program data.

As of the census of 2000, there were 32,660 people, 13,859 households, and 8,980 families residing in the town. The population density was 738.2 inhabitants per square mile (285.0/km^{2}). There were 20,055 housing units at an average density of 453.3 per square mile (175.0/km^{2}). The racial makeup of the town was 93.39% White, 1.82% Black or African American, 0.51% Native American, 0.92% Asian, 0.02% Pacific Islander, 1.44% from other races, and 1.91% from two or more races. Hispanic or Latino of any race were 1.28% of the population.

There were 13,859 households, out of which 24.2% had children under the age of 18 living with them, 52.0% were married couples living together, 10.1% had a female householder with no husband present, and 35.2% were non-families. 29.8% of all households were made up of individuals, and 14.0% had someone living alone who was 65 years of age or older. The average household size was 2.30 and the average family size was 2.84.

In the town, the population was spread out, with 20.7% under the age of 18, 4.8% from 18 to 24, 24.5% from 25 to 44, 27.5% from 45 to 64, and 22.5% who were 65 years of age or older. The median age was 45 years. For every 100 females, there were 87.6 males. For every 100 females age 18 and over, there were 83.9 males.

The median income for a household in the town was $68,191, and the median income for a family was $97,422. Males had a median income of $61,797 versus $38,867 for females. The per capita income for the town was $42,548. About 4.5% of families and 6.9% of the population were below the poverty line, including 8.8% of those under age 18 and 6.2% of those age 65 or over.

== Government and politics ==
Falmouth is represented in the Massachusetts House of Representatives as a part of two districts, the Third Barnstable (which also includes portions of Barnstable, Bourne and Mashpee), and the Barnstable, Dukes and Nantucket District, which includes all of Martha's Vineyard, Nantucket and Gosnold. The town is represented in the Massachusetts Senate as a part of the Plymouth and Barnstable district, which includes Bourne, Kingston, Pembroke, Plymouth, and Sandwich. The town is patrolled by the Seventh (Bourne) Barracks of Troop D of the Massachusetts State Police.

On the national level, Falmouth is a part of Massachusetts's 9th congressional district, and is currently represented by Bill Keating.

Since 1937, Falmouth has been governed by a representative town meeting and led by a five-member Select Board serving rotating three-year terms. Twenty-seven town meeting members are elected to three-year terms from nine precincts. The state senator and state representatives who both reside in the town and represent districts that overlap with town serve as town meeting members at large. Prior to 1937, the town was governed by an open town meeting and Select Board. The town operates its own police and fire departments, with a central police station and five fire stations. The fire department also operates the town's ambulance service with four-ambulances staffed 24/7. The town's central library is located downtown. There are branches in North and East Falmouth, and private libraries in West Falmouth and Woods Hole which are open to the public. There are seven post offices in town for the six ZIP codes, although several overlap and the main office handles the majority of the work. Falmouth is also the site of Falmouth Hospital, which serves the Upper Cape region.

Falmouth has a reputation of being a town that's heavily liberal. Since the 1960s, Falmouth has only been won by Republicans Richard Nixon in 1972, and Ronald Reagan in 1980 and 1984. Since 1988, the town has given wide margins to the Democratic candidates.

Falmouth presidential election results
Year	Democratic	Republican	Third parties	Total Votes	Difference
2020	64.57% 14,134	33.44% 7,319	2.00% 437	21,890	31.13%
2016	58.37% 11,467	36.47% 7,165	5.17% 1,015	19,647	21.90%
2012	56.80% 11,127	41.67% 8,163	1.53% 299	19,589	15.13%
2008	59.82% 11,725	38.28% 7,503	1.89% 371	19,599	21.54%
2004	58.32% 11,274	40.38% 7,807	1.30% 251	19,332	17.93%
2000	55.78% 9,835	36.38% 6,414	7.84% 1,382	17,631	19.40%
1996	58.92% 9,460	31.42% 5,044	9.66% 1,551	16,055	27.51%
1992	47.92% 7,622	28.38% 4,514	23.71% 3,771	15,907	19.54%
1988	53.31% 7,893	45.60% 6,751	1.09% 162	14,806	7.71%
1984	47.25% 6,403	52.40% 7,100	0.35% 47	13,550	5.14%
1980	35.35% 4,412	44.73% 5,582	19.92% 2,486	12,480	9.38%
1976	50.00% 5,657	46.37% 5,246	3.62% 410	11,313	3.63%
1972	44.98% 4,117	54.51% 4,989	0.50% 46	9,152	9.53%
1968	49.25% 3,433	47.47% 3,309	3.29% 229	6,971	1.78%
1964	66.27% 3,994	33.33% 2,009	0.40% 24	6,027	32.94%
1960	49.25% 2,841	50.63% 2,921	0.12% 7	5,769	1.39%
1956	24.83% 1,175	75.03% 3,551	0.15% 7	4,733	50.20%
1952	30.83% 1,297	69.15% 2,909	0.02% 1	4,207	38.32%
1948	31.41% 1,006	67.75% 2,170	0.84% 27	3,203	36.34%
1944	39.34% 1,053	60.59% 1,622	0.07% 2	2,677	21.26%
1940	39.49% 1,065	60.18% 1,623	0.33% 9	2,697	20.69%

== Education ==
Falmouth's public school system serves about 4,500 students yearly. There are four schools, East Falmouth, Mullen-Hall, North Falmouth, and Teaticket, which serve the elementary school population, from pre-kindergarten to fourth grade. The Morse Pond Middle School serves grades five and six, while the Lawrence Junior High School serves grades seven and eight. Falmouth High School covers grades 9–12. (Prior to 1974 the 9–12 grades were in the Lawrence building and known as Lawrence High School.) FHS's athletics teams are nicknamed the Clippers, and their colors are maroon and white. They compete in the Atlantic Coast League, having moved recently from the Old Colony League. Their chief rival is nearby Barnstable High School. The public schools are supported in part by the Volunteers in Public Schools (VIPS), various PTO associations, the Falmouth Scholarship Association, the Falmouth Education Foundation (FEF), the Falmouth STEM Boosters and the Woods Hole Science Technology Partnership.

Falmouth is also the home of a private school, Falmouth Academy, serving grades 7 through 12. Falmouth high school students may also choose to attend the Upper Cape Cod Regional Technical High School in Bourne free of charge. Resident students can also attend Sturgis Charter Public School in Hyannis also free of charge, pending acceptance through a lottery.

== Sports and recreation ==
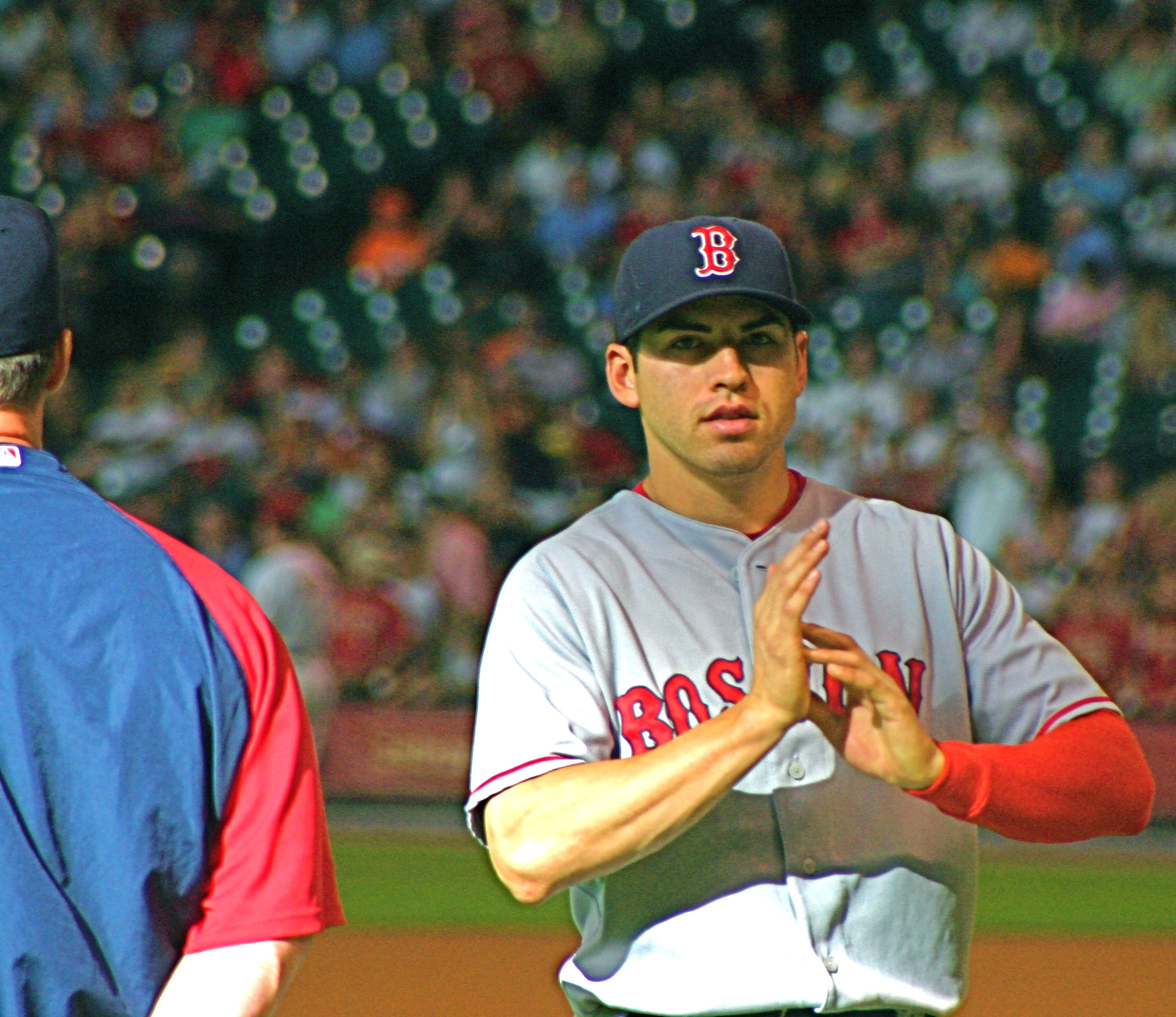
Boston Red Sox All-Star Jacoby Ellsbury played for the Falmouth Commodores in 2004.

Falmouth is home to the Falmouth Commodores, an amateur collegiate summer baseball team in the Cape Cod Baseball League. The team plays at Arnie Allen Diamond at Guv Fuller Field, and has featured dozens of players who went on to careers in Major League Baseball, such as Tino Martinez, Darin Erstad, and Jacoby Ellsbury.

Falmouth is the home of its namesake Falmouth Road Race, an annual race started in 1973 that draws over 10,000 runners from all over the world. The race runs 7 miles (11 km) from the village of Woods Hole to Falmouth Heights Beach in downtown Falmouth.

== Arts and entertainment ==
Falmouth is home to a vibrant theatre community. The College Light Opera Company has performed at the Highfield Theatre every summer since 1969. Other institutions include the Falmouth Theatre Guild and the Cape Cod Theatre Project.

In addition to theatre, there is the Cape Cod Conservatory and the Falmouth Arts Guild.

Falmouth holds a yearly Christmas parade in the month of December that runs along Main Street in downtown Falmouth.

At the end of July, the Woods Hole Film Festival showcases local and international films in a week long event. Established in 1991, it is the oldest independent film festival on Cape Cod.

== Notable people ==
- Peter Abrahams, author
- Ben Affleck, actor
- Casey Affleck, actor
- Katharine Lee Bates, writer of "America the Beautiful"
- Ada C. Chaplin (1842-1883), writer of Christian religious works
- Steve Cishek, relief pitcher for the Chicago Cubs
- Colleen Coyne, 1998 Olympic gold medalist on the U.S. women's ice hockey team
- Wesley Dennis, illustrator of children's books
- Pete Doherty "The Duke of Dorchester"
- Jessica Dubroff, seven-year-old pilot trainee who died in a plane crash
- Jacob Sloat Fassett, U.S. congressman from Elmira, New York; Fassett's Point in West Falmouth and the town of Fassett, Quebec, are named after him
- Melissa Febos, writer
- Paul Harney, former professional PGA golfer, resided in Falmouth and owned the Paul Harney Golf Club in Hatchville
- Edward Hopkins Jenkins (1850–1931), agricultural chemist; director of the Connecticut Agricultural Experiment Station (1900–1923); born in Falmouth
- Mark Lachs, physician, scientist, and popular author
- Julia Marden, Wampanoag artist
- Amanda McGonigle, activist and influencer
- John Muse, professional hockey player
- Frederick E. Olmsted, WPA muralist and sculptor then later scientist
- Julia O'Malley-Keyes, fine artist
- Joseph Rago, journalist
- Charles Bennett Ray Abolitionist journalist
- Matt Scannell, musician, lead singer of Vertical Horizon
- Greg Dean Schmitz, online film journalist (Yahoo! Movies, Rotten Tomatoes)
- Sunita Williams, astronaut and United States Navy officer

== Military installations ==
Camp Edwards, formerly named Camp Falmouth, is a US military training camp in western Barnstable County. It is the largest part of Joint Base Cape Cod, formerly named Massachusetts Military Reservation. The installation is of economic and environmental importance.

== Groundwater pollution ==
During the 1970s and 1980s, it was discovered that the groundwater in some areas of Falmouth had been contaminated by toxic chemicals linked to the disposal of jet fuel, solvents, industrial chemicals, and other substances on the Massachusetts Military Reservation, now known as Joint Base Cape Cod. Plumes of groundwater pollution that reached into Falmouth contaminated household well water in some neighborhoods and forced the town to shut down a public well in 1975 that accounted for 25% of the town's public water supply. A major report was released on the contamination in 1986. In 1996, the Air Force Center for Environmental Excellence (now known as the Air Force Center for Engineering and the Environment) assumed responsibility for the cleanup, treating soils at several sites and installing pumping wells in an effort to contain the plumes of groundwater contamination.

In 2010, the Silent Spring Institute tested about 20 public water supplies, 40 percent of which had detectable levels of perfluorinated compounds (PFCs). In 2015, the Air Force started testing private wells in the Currier Road area after water treatment plant samples showed elevated levels of 1,4-dioxane. Since May 2016, four houses in the Currier Road neighborhood have been receiving bottled water for elevated levels of PFCs after the U.S. Environmental Protection Agency established a national standard for PFCs, such as PFOS and PFOAs.

== In popular culture ==
- Vertical Horizon's 2001 hit "Best I Ever Had (Grey Sky Morning)" was inspired by Quissett Harbor, a body of water located on the west end of town. Lead singer Matt Scannell wrote the song while living in Falmouth early in his career.
- In 2015, HBO released a documentary, Heroin: Cape Cod. Seven out of eight of the participants featured in the film lived in Falmouth.
- The album Cape God by Allie X was inspired by the documentary.
