= Julia O'Malley-Keyes =

American painter

- Occupation: Artist

Julia O'Malley-Keyes is an American painter. She is the founder of the Massachusetts fine art galleries Day Hill Fine Art and her current gallery O’Malley-Keyes Fine Art. She is best known for her work as a maritime artist and her paintings depicting Cape Cod.

== Early life ==
Julia O’Malley-Keyes grew up in Greenwich, Connecticut, spending the summers with her family on Cape Cod. She began painting as a child and sold her first painting at the age of 16. She moved to Cape Cod full-time in 1969. She received early life training in painting under contemporary artist Henry Hensche and Andrew Wyeth.

== Studios ==
O'Malley-Keyes founded her first studio in Provincetown, Massachusetts at the age of 22, and operated it for ten years. After travelling for a few years, she founded the art gallery Day Hill Fine Art in 1996. She operated the gallery until 2012, then spent five years travelling and living in Panama, where she focused on figural work, before moving back to Falmouth. Her current art gallery is O’Malley-Keyes Fine Art, which she opened in 2012 in Falmouth. She has also shown her works in group exhibitions.

== Work ==
The Cape Cod Enterprise said of O’Malley-Keyes that she is “devoted to highly detailed, action packed oil paintings,” largely of maritime scenes and themes. In 2007 O'Malley-Keyes provided the painting for the Figawi Race, a competitive sailing regatta that stretches from Hyannis to Nantucket. Cape Cod Art described her as a “highly regarded maritime artist whose paintings and prints are in collections around the world”. She is an American Society of Marine Artists Signature Artist.

== Philanthropy ==
O’Malley-Keyes has led fine art auctions with the proceeds going to charity.
