= North Falmouth Village Historic District =

Historic district in Massachusetts, United States

- U.S. National Register of Historic Places
- U.S. Historic district
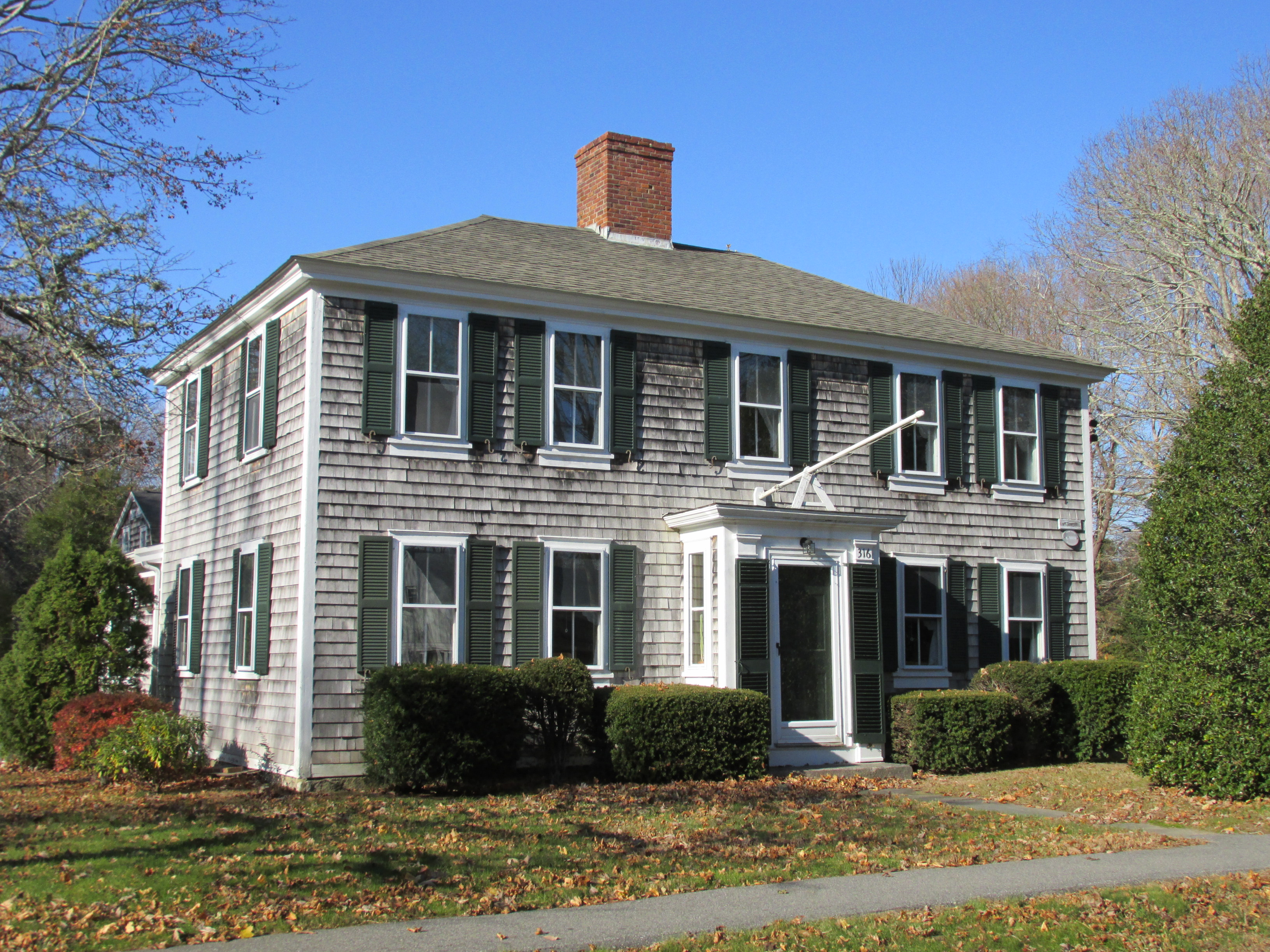
- Capt. James Nye House

- Location within Cape Cod Location within Massachusetts Location within the United States
- Location: Falmouth, Massachusetts
- Coordinates: 41°38′47″N 70°37′2″W
- Area: 95.5 acres (38.6 ha)
- Built: 1762
- Architectural style: Greek Revival, Late Victorian, Colonial Revival
- NRHP reference No.: 98000121
- Added to NRHP: February 20, 1998

The North Falmouth Village Historic District encompasses the historic 19th-century village of North Falmouth, Massachusetts, which is a village in the town of Falmouth, Massachusetts. It is a linear district, extending along Old Main Road south from its junction with Massachusetts Route 28A to Winslow Road. This area gradually developed over the 19th century, principally in support of maritime activities centered on Buzzards Bay to the west. The district contains a cross-section of architectural styles popular from the early 19th to early 20th centuries. It was listed on the National Register of Historic Places in 1998.

== Description and history ==
The North Falmouth area was inhabited by Native Americans roughly until the beginning of the 18th century, when the area was purchased by colonists as part of Falmouth, which had been incorporated in 1686. Among the early settlers were the Nye family, who moved what is probably the district's oldest building, now 96 Old Main Road, to that location in 1762. Of the twenty-four houses known to have been built by Nyes, fourteen are still standing. The area was initially used for agriculture, with maritime pursuits becoming a prominent economic force in the first half of the 19th century. The village's church, the North Village Congregational Church, is a Greek Revival structure built in 1832, and a post office was opened in 1848 in Ferdinand Nye's house at 200 Old Main Road.

The district saw a spurt of growth after the railroad came through to the east of Old Main Road in 1872, after which the area saw a gradual transformation into a summer resort area. Other than the church, civic buildings were relatively late in arriving in the village. Megansett Hall was built in 1886 as a community gathering space for social events, and the fire station (now a library) was built in 1915. Two small commercial buildings survive from the 1920s, the Falmouth Superette (279 Old Main) and the Rand Office Block at Country Road.

== See also ==
- National Register of Historic Places listings in Barnstable County, Massachusetts
