= Ada C. Chaplin =

American writer (1842–1883)

- Born: January 25, 1842; Falmouth
- Died: December 9, 1883 (aged 41); Mansfield
- Occupation: Writer
- Spouse(s): Adoniram Judson Chaplin

Ada C. Chaplin (January 25, 1842 – December 9, 1883) was an American writer of Christian religious works.

== Early life ==
She was born Ada C. Coffin on January 25, 1842 in Falmouth, Massachusetts, the daughter of Robert A. Coffin and Wealthy Arms Coffin. She was raised in Conway, Massachusetts.

== Career ==
She was the author of a number of books, including A Mind of My Own, Eight Years Old, Little Nobody,Two Half Dollars,Widow Maynard’s Cow; or, Principle and Impulse. In 1871, she won a $500 prize for The Religious Training for the Young. In 1874, she presented her essay "Jonah as a Missionary and the Jonas of To-Day" at a Womens' Baptist Missionary Society conference held at Shelburne Falls.

In 1883, she published The Old Year and the New, a book of Sunday School exercises.

== Personal life and death ==
In 1860, she married Baptist clergyman Adoniram Judson Chaplin. He was the son of Jeremiah Chaplin and his siblings included Hannah O'Brien Chaplin.

Chaplin died on 9 December 1883 in Connecticut of tuberculosis. She was interred in Conway.

== Bibliography ==
- A Mind of My Own
- Little Nobody
- Two Half Dollars
- Widow Maynard’s Cow; or, Principle and Impulse. Philadelphia: American Baptist Publication Society, 1863.
- Eight Years Old
- A Happy New Year: The Story of a Boy Who Hunted for the Little Foxes. New York: Carlton & Porter, 1864.
- Annie Lincoln’s Lesson; or, A Day in the Life of a Thankful Child. Philadelphia, Presbyterian Board of Publication, 1866.
- The Little Watchman. Philadelphia, Presbyterian Board of Publication, 1868.
- Edith’s Two Account Books. Philadelphia, Presbyterian Board of Publication, 1868.
- Grace Harland; or, Christ's path to happiness. Philadelphia, Presbyterian Board of Publication, 1869.
- Charity Hurlburt. Boston, H. Hoyt, 1870.
- Christ's Cadets. Philadelphia: American Baptist Publication Society, 1870.
- Our Gold-Mine: The Story of American Baptist Missions in India. Boston: W. G. Corthell, 1877.
- Early Sowers in the White Fields of France. Boston: Women's Baptist Missionary Society, 1881.
- Workers Together. Boston: H. Gannett, 1882.
- The Old Year and the New: Exercises for Christmas and New Years', Lawn Parties, Mission Bands, and Sunday School Entertainments. Boston: Howard Gannett, 1883.
- Cousin Mercy's Idea; or, The Heavenly Wardrobe. Philadelphia: American Baptist Publication Society, .1884.
