= Arnie Allen Diamond =

Baseball venue in Falmouth, MA, US

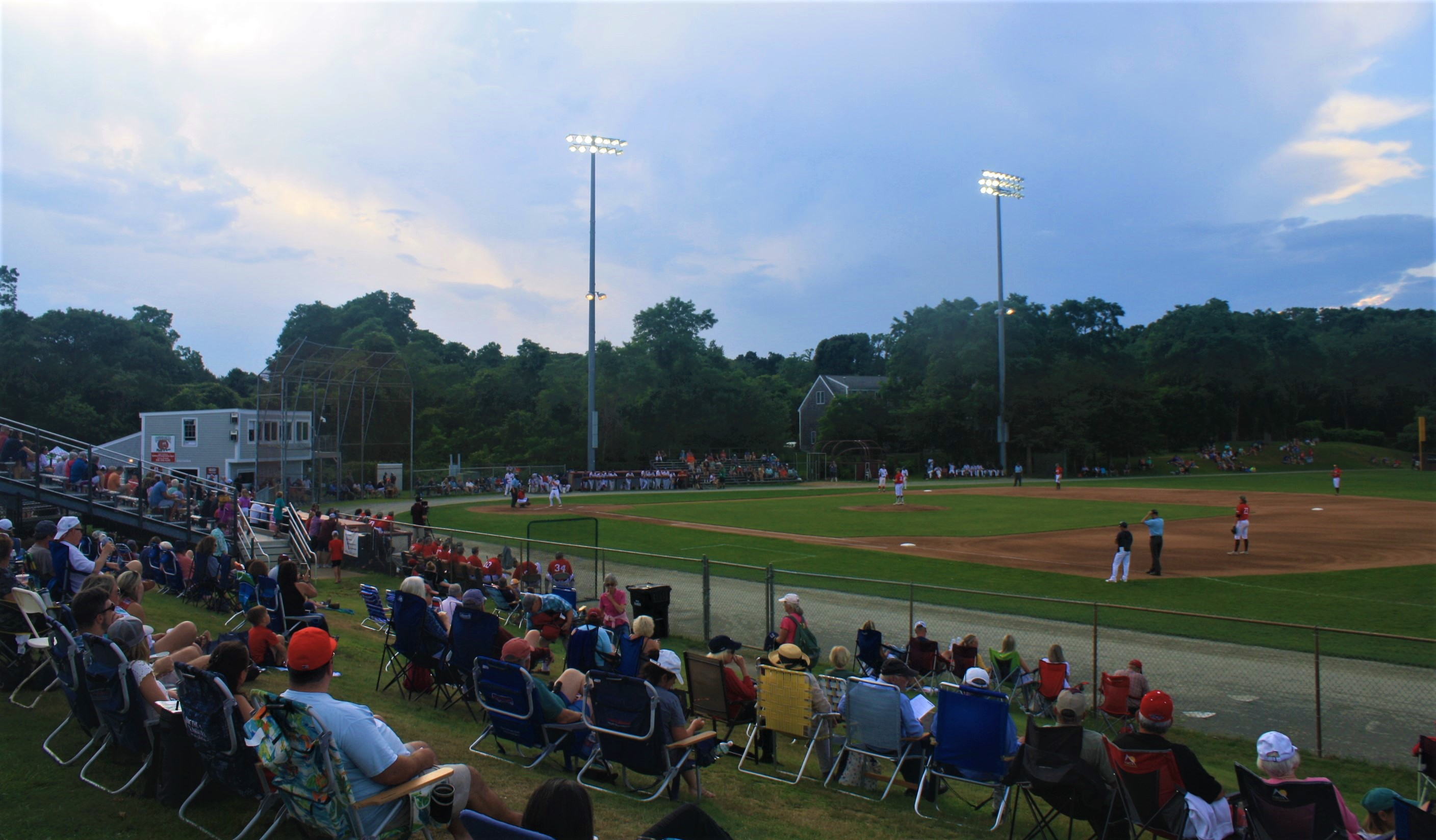
- Interactive map of Arnie Allen Diamond
- Full name: Arnie Allen Diamond at Guv Fuller Field
- Address: 790 Main Street
- Location: Falmouth, Massachusetts
- Coordinates: 41°33′18.79″N 70°36′14.70″W
- Capacity: 8,000
- Surface: Grass
- Field size: Left Field: 320 ft Center Field: 385 ft Right Field: 320 ft

Construction
- Built: 1938-1939

Tenant
- Falmouth Commodores

Arnie Allen Diamond at Guv Fuller Field is a baseball venue in Falmouth, Massachusetts, home to the Falmouth Commodores of the Cape Cod Baseball League (CCBL).

== History ==
Located in downtown Falmouth, the town athletic field was constructed in the late 1930s with assistance from the Work Projects Administration. The facility was dedicated in 1952 in honor of Elmer E. "Guv" Fuller, longtime coach and athletic director at Falmouth's Lawrence High School. Fuller, whose nickname referenced 1920s Massachusetts Governor Alvan T. Fuller, had quarterbacked Falmouth's high school football team in 1905 and 1906. He returned to his alma mater in 1926, and remained a central figure in the town's athletic programs until his retirement in 1952.

Falmouth's CCBL ballclub has called the field home since 1964, having previously played its home games at the Central Park field in Falmouth Heights. In 2004, the baseball diamond at Guv Fuller Field was named in memory of longtime Commodores' volunteer Arnie Allen. Allen began his association with the Commodores as a seven-year-old bat boy, and remained with the club for 46 seasons, serving primarily as the team's equipment manager, and receiving the league's inaugural Lifetime Achievement Award in 2002. Aging and in need of significant upgrades, the facility was awarded a field improvement grant from the Yawkey Foundation in 2006. Another round of major upgrades began in 2018.

Arnie Allen Diamond at Guv Fuller Field has hosted the CCBL all-star game festivities several times, including its first all-star game in 1966, and its most recent in 2003. The field has seen Falmouth claim six CCBL titles, including four consecutively from 1968 to 1971. The ballpark has been the summertime home of dozens of future major leaguers such as Tino Martinez, Darin Erstad, and Jacoby Ellsbury.

== See also ==
- Cape Cod Baseball League
- Falmouth Commodores
