= College Light Opera Company =

The College Light Opera Company (CLOC) is an educational summer stock theatre company based in Falmouth, Massachusetts, on Cape Cod. It produces and performs 9 operettas and musicals during an eleven-week season each summer with performances taking place in Falmouth's historic Highfield Theatre.

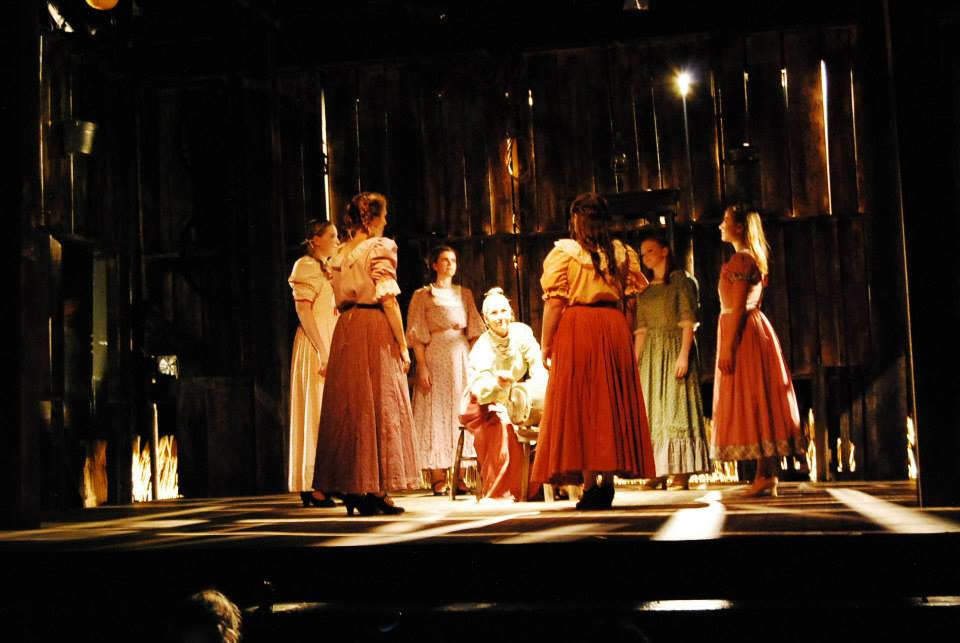
2015 Production of Oklahoma

== History ==
The company was founded by D. Thomas Tull and Robert Haslun in 1969 immediately following the demise of the Oberlin College Gilbert & Sullivan Players who had performed in Falmouth from 1953 to 1966 Haslun had been an Oberlin College student himself and went on to become Secretary of the College, a post which he held from 1978 to 2007. Although many Oberlin students still participate in College Light Opera Company each summer, it is no longer officially associated with Oberlin College nor is it solely a Gilbert and Sullivan troupe. The company's repertoire now also includes comic operas and operettas by other composers as well as contemporary and classic Broadway musicals such as Evita, Jekyll & Hyde, Brigadoon, and Carousel.

CLOC is run by a Board of Trustees with Mark A. Pearson as Executive and Artistic Director. Its aim is to provide young actors and musicians with the opportunity to perform with professional directors and conductors during an eleven-week resident program while providing cultural and musical entertainment to the people of Cape Cod. It is a non profit organization.

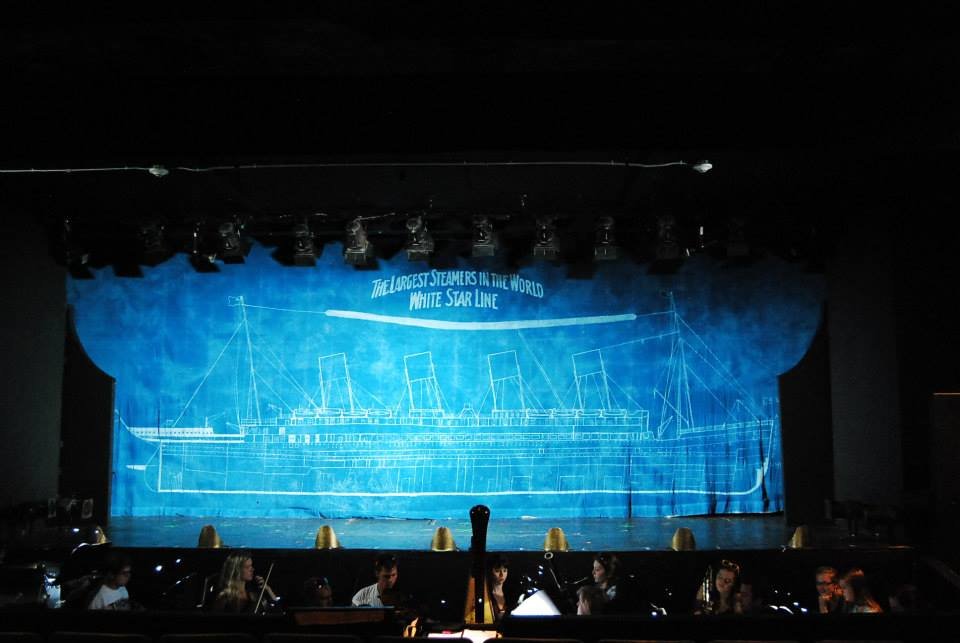
Scrim from Titanic

== The company ==
The company consists of a staff between 25-30, a technical crew and costume crew of 6 members each, a 32-person vocal company and 17-20 person orchestra.

In addition to the Executive and Artistic Director, Mark A. Pearson, there is a publicity director, a business manager, and two box office treasurers. CLOC also employees a Chef de Cuisine, Director of Plant and property, and resident Costume, Set and Lighting Designers in addition to a technical director, stage manager and a crew of scenic and costume technicians. The creative staff consists of around 4-6 Stage Directors and 4-6 Musical Directors, a choreographer, two Associate Conductors and two Accompanists. The Chef de Cuisine, Director of Plant and Property, Design Staff and Directorial staff are often professionals in the field, while the other positions are mostly filled by undergraduate/graduate students, or recent graduates.

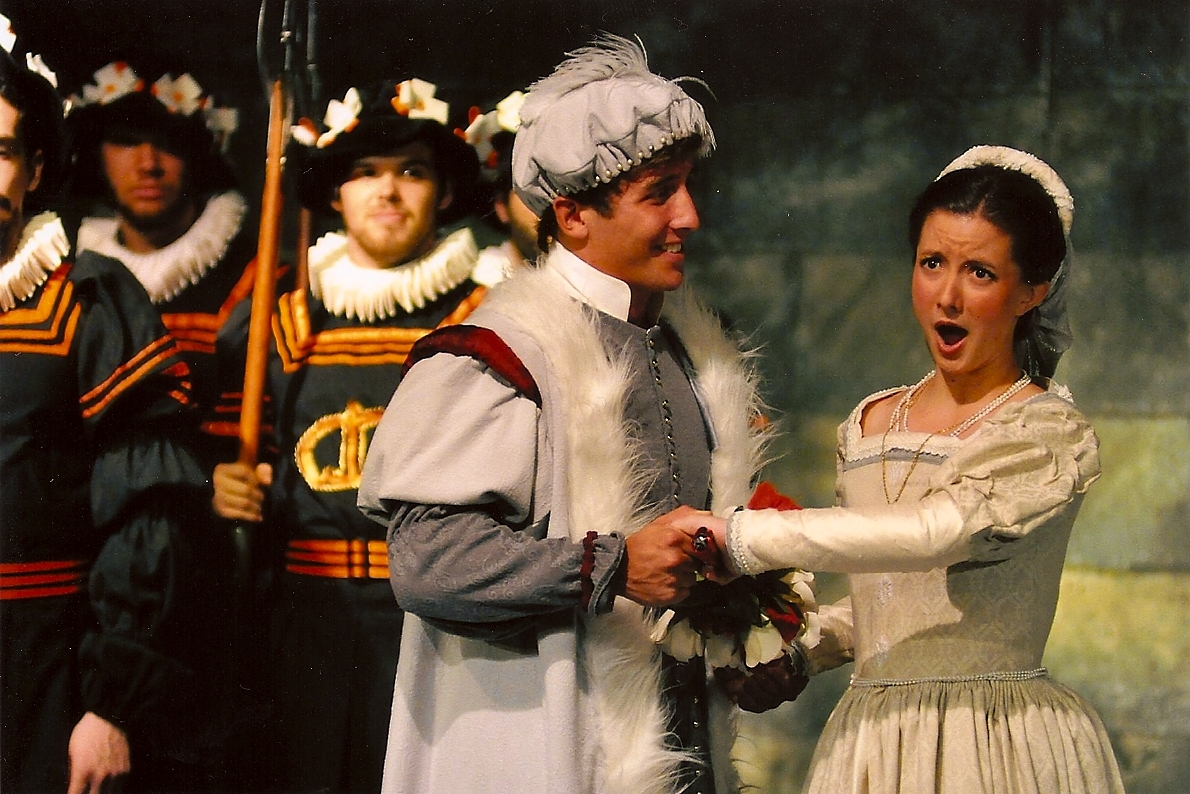
The Yeomen of the Guard

The vocal company consists of 32 members. All members are taken on an ensemble contract, with casting for principal roles taking place throughout season. CLOC is well known for its choral training and high standard of vocal performance.

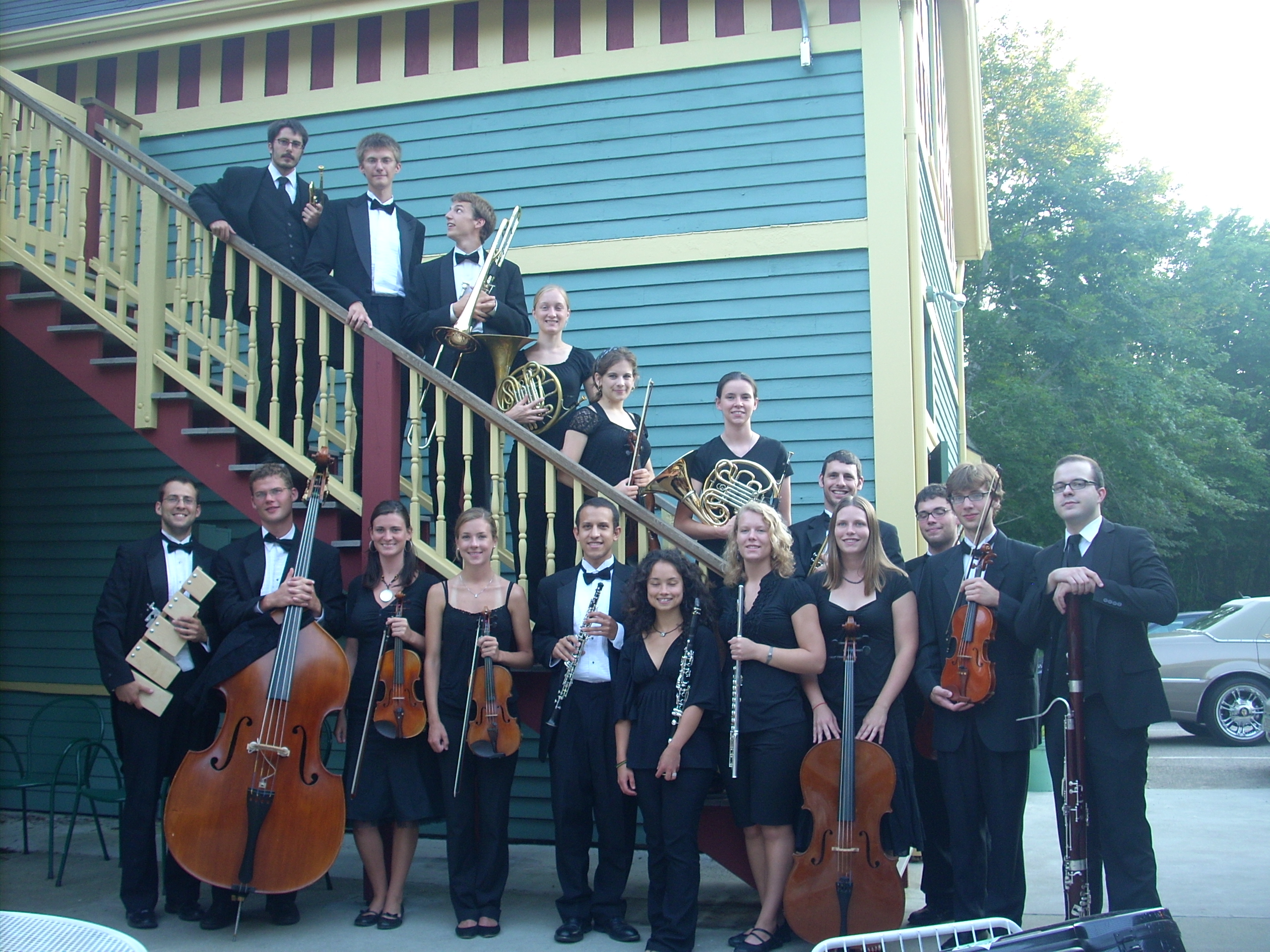
The CLOC Orchestra in 2008

The College Light Opera Company Orchestra consists of 17-20 musicians. Many are music majors, majoring in the instrument they have been contracted to play. In addition to performing in the CLOC theatre productions, the orchestra holds its own concert hosted by the College Light Opera Company Orchestra and the Cape Cod Conservatory. These concerts were started in the early 1990s by John and Avery Funkhouser and were initially held in the main hall of the West Falmouth Library until moving to the recital hall of the Cape Cod Conservatory in 2006. Summer 2008 marked the CLOC Orchestra's first symphonic concert.

== West Falmouth Campus ==
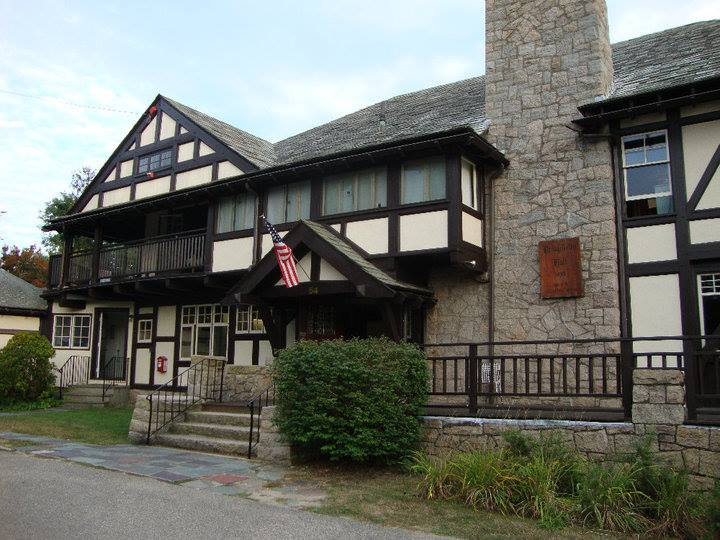
Highfield Hall

Since 1975, The College Light Opera Company has called Bridgefields Hall in West Falmouth, MA home. The main building houses the rehearsal space and dining facilities as well as the costume shop. In addition to The Hall, there are four cottages on the campus.
