= West Falmouth Village Historic District =

Historic district in Massachusetts, United States

- U.S. National Register of Historic Places
- U.S. Historic district
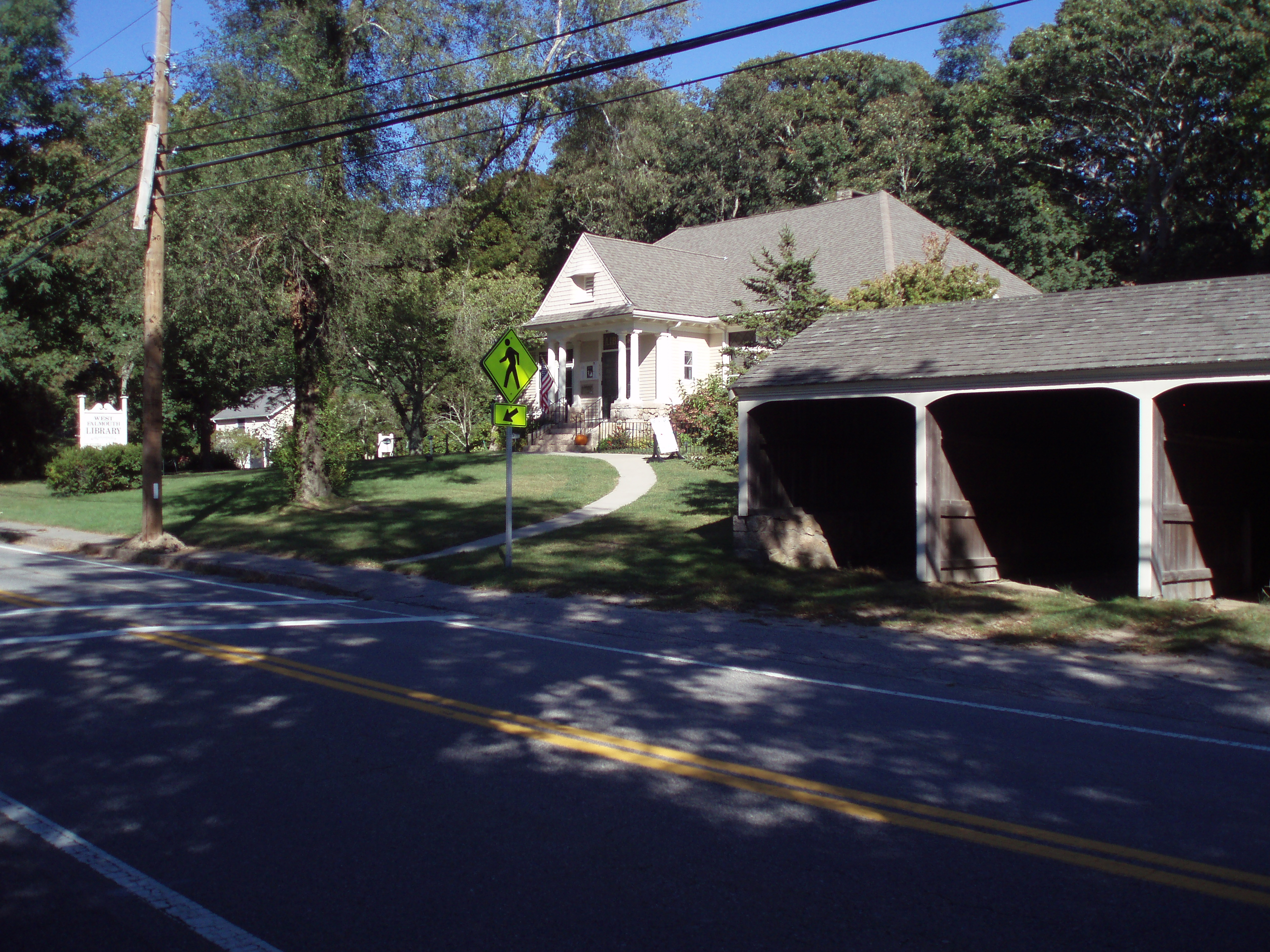
- West Falmouth Library and Quaker Carriage Sheds

- Location within Cape Cod Location within Massachusetts Location within the United States
- Location: Falmouth, Massachusetts
- Coordinates: 41°36′5″N 70°38′5″W
- Built: 1673
- Architect: Bourne, Timothy C.; et al.
- Architectural style: Mid 19th Century Revival, Federal, Georgian
- NRHP reference No.: 98000253
- Added to NRHP: April 2, 1998

The West Falmouth Village Historic District is a historic district along West Falmouth Highway (Massachusetts Route 28A) in West Falmouth, Massachusetts, which is a village in the town of Falmouth, Massachusetts. The northern end of the historic district is approximately at Bourne Farm, near Thomas Landers Road, extending south along Route 28A through West Falmouth Village to about Garrison Road.

The area was settled in 1673 and added to the National Register of Historic Places in 1998.

Several of the historic buildings in West Falmouth Village are the West Falmouth Library, the Quaker Meeting House and Quaker Carriage Sheds, Emerson House, the West Falmouth Fire Station, and numerous historic houses.

The Shining Sea Bikeway passes close to the center of West Falmouth Village, providing access to the beautiful Great Sippewissett Marsh to the south and the historic 1775 Bourne Farm and cranberry bogs to the north. Chapoquoit Beach, a Falmouth public beach, is also close to the center of West Falmouth Village.

== See also ==
- National Register of Historic Places listings in Barnstable County, Massachusetts
