= New Silver Beach =

- Village
- Nicknames: Silver Beach, New Silver
- Interactive map of New Silver Beach
- Coordinates: 41°38′26.78″N 70°38′25.69″W
- Country: United States
- State: Massachusetts
- County: Barnstable
- Settled: 1893

Area
  - Total: 2.7 sq mi (7.0 km^{2})
  - Land: 1.8 sq mi (4.7 km^{2})
  - Water: 0.9 sq mi (2.3 km^{2})
- Elevation: 23 ft (7.0 m)
- Time zone: UTC-5 (Eastern (EST))
  - Summer (DST): UTC-4 (EDT)
- ZIP codes: 02556, 02565
- Area code: 508

New Silver Beach is a beach and village of the same name. It is primarily a summer colony and is the largest settlement at Wild Harbor, a natural bay on the north shore of Buzzards Bay.

It is located on Massachusetts's famous Cape Cod in the census-designated place (CDP) of North Falmouth, in the town of Falmouth, Massachusetts. The area was first settled in 1893 as a seasonal seaside resort for the growing upper middle class of Boston, Massachusetts.

== History ==
The original planned settlement was first constructed in 1893 as sea bathing was gaining widespread popularity in Europe and the United States. The first street pattern resembled a star with four avenues radiating out from the waterfront intersection of Ocean View Avenue and Moses Road (then called Beach Road). Building proved profitable for developers and by 1898 Joseph Dahlburg and his Silver Beach Water Company had laid out the plans for New Silver Heights, an expansion of development in the area of higher elevation to the west of the original village. At the turn of the 20th century, the Brockton based Silver Beach Land Co. had profitably developed most of the existing plots and New Silver had gained notoriety as a fashionable destination. In the early 20th century, the Silver Beach Hotel was opened at the corner of Arlington Avenue and Wickertree Road. The hotel, though initially successful with the introduction of the automobile, went bankrupt and was subsequently sold and demolished. In the 1920s, numerous fashionable mansions were constructed on the neighboring peninsula of Nyes Neck and although many period homes remain, only two such Gatsby era mansions remain. The village was severely damaged by the great New England Hurricane of 1938 and rebuilding lasted well into the post-war period. During this time, nearby Old Silver Beach became the preeminent destination for the Upper Cape with the construction of the now famous Sea Crest Hotel. Though New Silver lost its regional fame, the economic booms of the 1980s and 1990s led to the rapid creation of new satellite developments enabling the area to maintain its status as a desirable location for holidaymakers.

== Yachting ==
Yachting has a long and prolific history in the area. New Silver Anchorage was dredged from Wild Harbor in the 1920s to shelter Beetle Cat boats which had become popular among the Cape Cod elite. Prior to the Second World War organized sailing flourished out of Wild Harbor, however U-boat hysteria during the war led to dwindling popularity. On August 30, 1953, the Wild Harbor Yacht Club was formed on Wickertree Road to primarily serve New Silver and its constituent communities. The Club was incorporated by the United States Sailing Association the following year. A Widgeon fleet was organized in 1979. The club clinched the Southern Massachusetts Beetle Cat championship in 1981, 1982, 1984, 1985, 1986, 1987, and 1989. In 1990 the club focused its junior sailing on the new 420 class racing vessels which were already popular in Europe and Australia. Wild Harbor Yacht Club is a regional powerhouse and dominates the north shore of Buzzards Bay and competes competitively in the Southern Massachusetts Sailing Grand Prix. Wild Harbor has produced four collegiate all-Americans and a member of the 2000 US International 470 team.

== Geography ==
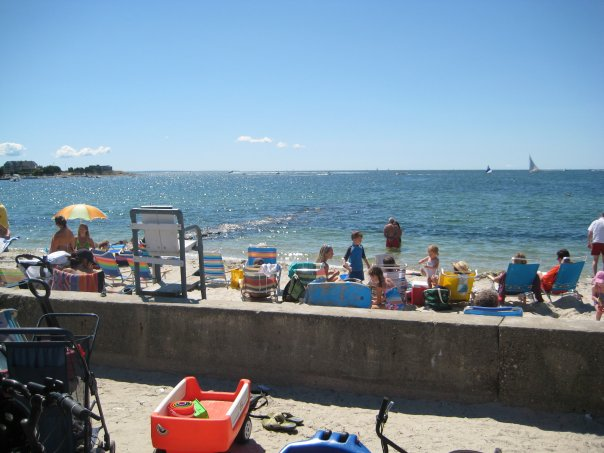
New Silver Beach at high tide from the access at the intersection of Moses Road and Ocean View

The original village of New Silver is built on the sandy floodplain of the tidal Wild Harbor River. The river flows in and out of Wild Harbor, a shallow natural bay onto which the village fronts. The older village center is separated from the newer Silver Beach Heights by protected marshland. The Greater New Silver Area has come to include the newer constituent developments of Nyes Neck, Seascape, and Wild Harbor Estates.

=== Wild Harbor ===
Wild Harbor is a prominent geographic feature in the area. It is a shallow, natural bay at the mouth of the Wild Harbor River. The bay is formed by two headlands: Nyes Neck peninsula to the north and Crow's Point to the south. The mouth of the bay is oriented to the southwest, the predominant direction of the summer sea breeze giving the harbor unusually rough surf and predictable but strong wind patterns.

=== Silver Beach ===
The beach is located across the northeast shore of Wild Harbor between the estuary of Wild Harbor River and the channel of the New Silver Anchorage. The village center abuts the northern portion of the beach. The centrally located Moses Road runs parallel to the water between the two public access points at the end of Ocean View and Silver Beach Ave. respectively. The beach is protected from erosion by a series of rock jetties. The sandy output from the Wild Harbor river continually builds sandbars across the southern end of the beach which form a vast network of islands at low tide. A deeper sandbar runs about ten yards from the shoreline in an arc parallel to the rest of the beach and can be under between one and two feet of water at low tide. Because the beach is located on a bay opening onto the larger Buzzards Bay, the water is unusually warm for Cape Cod.

== Architecture ==
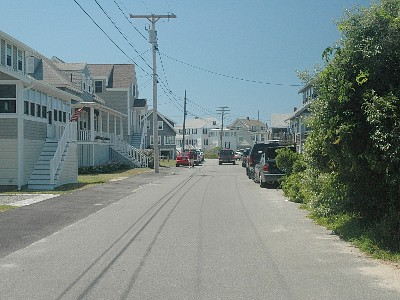
Victorian cottage style homes on Silver Beach Avenue in the village center

The village has an collection of fine 19th-century structures. Many of the homes in the older center of the village are original buildings or faithful reconstructions. The village center boasts examples of the American Victorian cottage style popular across New England before the turn of the 20th century.

== See also ==
- Cape Cod
- Falmouth
- North Falmouth
- Buzzards Bay
- Barnstable County
