= Mark Lachs =

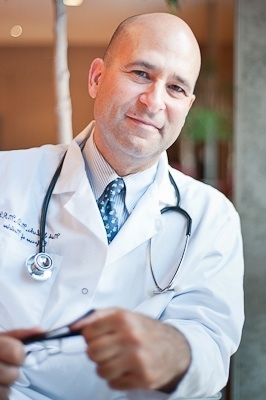
Lachs c. 2010

Mark Steven Lachs (born March 26, 1960) is an American physician, scientist, and popular author specializing in the field of aging. He is the Irene and Roy Psaty Distinguished Professor of Medicine at Weill Medical College of Cornell University in New York City, and Director of Geriatric Medicine for the NewYork-Presbyterian Healthcare System. An internationally recognized authority on the field of elder abuse, he has authored over 100 articles on the subject and other areas of gerontology, and conducted important research on the topic. He is also a founder of the New York City Elder Abuse Center, and the not for profit charity www.elderabuse.org.

== Early life and education ==
Born on Otis Air Force Base in Falmouth, Massachusetts, Lachs was raised primarily on Long Island, New York. He graduated from the University of Pennsylvania with a BA in Biology, and matriculated into the New York University School of Medicine after three years of undergraduate study. He returned to the Hospital of the University of Pennsylvania for residency training in internal medicine, and subsequently trained in geriatric medicine at Yale. He is board certified in both Internal Medicine and Geriatric Medicine. While at Yale, he was a Robert Wood Johnson Clinical Scholar, and trained in research methodology under the noted and controversial clinical epidemiologist Dr. Alvan Feinstein, who directed the program. At Yale he also earned a Master’s Degree in Public Health with a concentration in chronic disease epidemiology.

== Subsequent academic career and research ==
Lachs encountered his first cases of elder abuse while moonlighting in the Yale and other local emergency departments in the late 1980’s while a clinical scholar. Frustrated by the relative paucity of research on the topic, he chose it as a focus of his research fellowship, which emphasized the intersection of medicine with societal health problems.

Invited to join the Yale Geriatrics faculty as a junior member, his early studies involved linking a large existing longitudinal study of older adults in New Haven (The NIA funded EPESE Cohort) with Adult Protective Service records in the same jurisdiction. This created the largest and longest longitudinal studies of elder abuse ever conducted, and yielded important findings about prevalence, risk factors, and outcomes, including increased rates of death and nursing home placement among elder abuse victims.

In 1994 he was recruited to Weill Cornell Medicine to continue his research and build a clinical and scientific geriatric program. He has remained there since, continuing his research in elder abuse and practicing geriatric and internal medicine as an outpatient, inpatient, house call, and nursing home physician. He also teachers and mentors junior trainees in clinical geriatric medicine and aging research.

More recently he has been a Principal or Co-Principal investigator on other major studies including the New York State Elder Abuse Prevalence Study (among the largest ever conducted) and studies of resident to resident elder abuse in assisted living in nursing homes. Lachs also has an interest in the epidemiology and neuroscience of financial exploitation in older adults, and coined the term “Age Associated Financial Vulnerability” with neuropsychologist Dr. Duke Han of Keck School of Medicine of USC.

== Notable awards and community service ==
His many honors include a National Institutes on Aging Academic Leadership Award, a Paul Beeson Physician Faculty Scholarship in Aging, and the Carter Burden Humanitarian Award. He has testified before the United States Senate Special Committee on Aging, spoken at the White House about elder abuse, and service as a consultant to the World Health Organization on the topic. He has also served as an expert witness in criminal and civil cases related to elder abuse.

Lachs serves on the board of the American Federation for Aging Research and is its current president. He is also the founding medical director of the New York City Elder Abuse Center, and a founding board member of www.elderabuse.org, the first national charity to combat elder abuse through a combined mission of research, policy, and direct service.

== In Popular Lay Media ==
His book Treat Me, Not My Age (2010, Viking Penguin) was named one of the best consumer health books of the year. In the 1990s, he wrote a popular column for Prevention, “Caring for Mom and Dad”. He was written for The Wall Street Journal, CNN online, and other popular media outlets. Lachs has also been a commentator on NPR’s Morning Edition, profiled extensively on APM’s Marketplace, and appeared numerous times on Good Morning America and The Today Show, as well as other media outlets.
