= West Falmouth, Massachusetts =

- Census-designated place
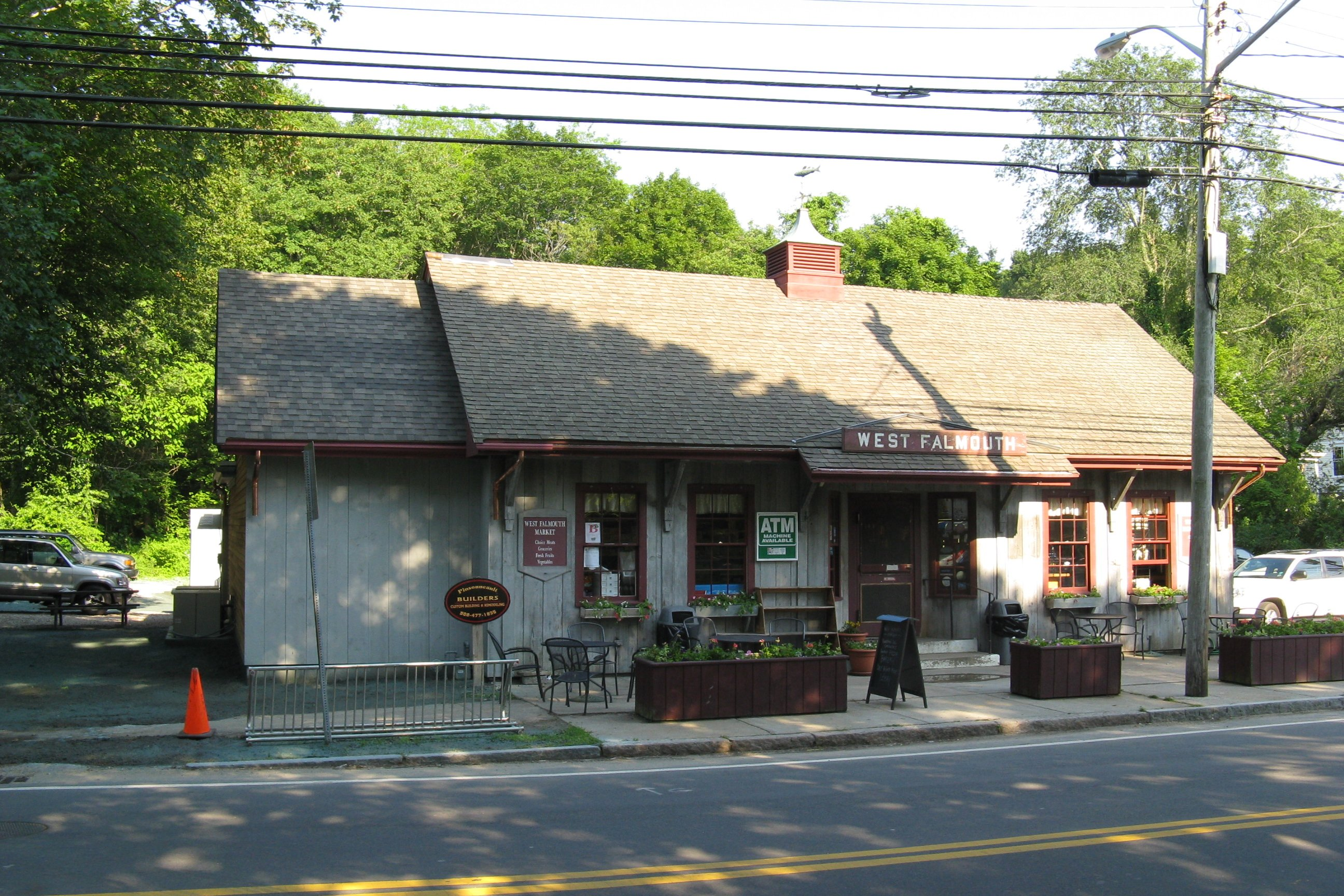
- West Falmouth Market

- Location in Barnstable County and the state of Massachusetts.
- Coordinates: 41°35′59″N 70°38′16″W
- Country: United States
- State: Massachusetts
- County: Barnstable
- Town: Falmouth

Area
  - Total: 4.36 sq mi (11.28 km^{2})
  - Land: 3.08 sq mi (7.98 km^{2})
  - Water: 1.28 sq mi (3.31 km^{2})
- Elevation: 6.6 ft (2 m)

Population (2020)
  - Total: 1,812
  - Density: 588.1/sq mi (227.08/km^{2})
- Time zone: UTC-5 (Eastern (EST))
  - Summer (DST): UTC-4 (EDT)
- ZIP Code: 02574 (West Falmouth); 02540 (Falmouth)
- Area code: 508
- FIPS code: 25-75960
- GNIS feature ID: 0616149

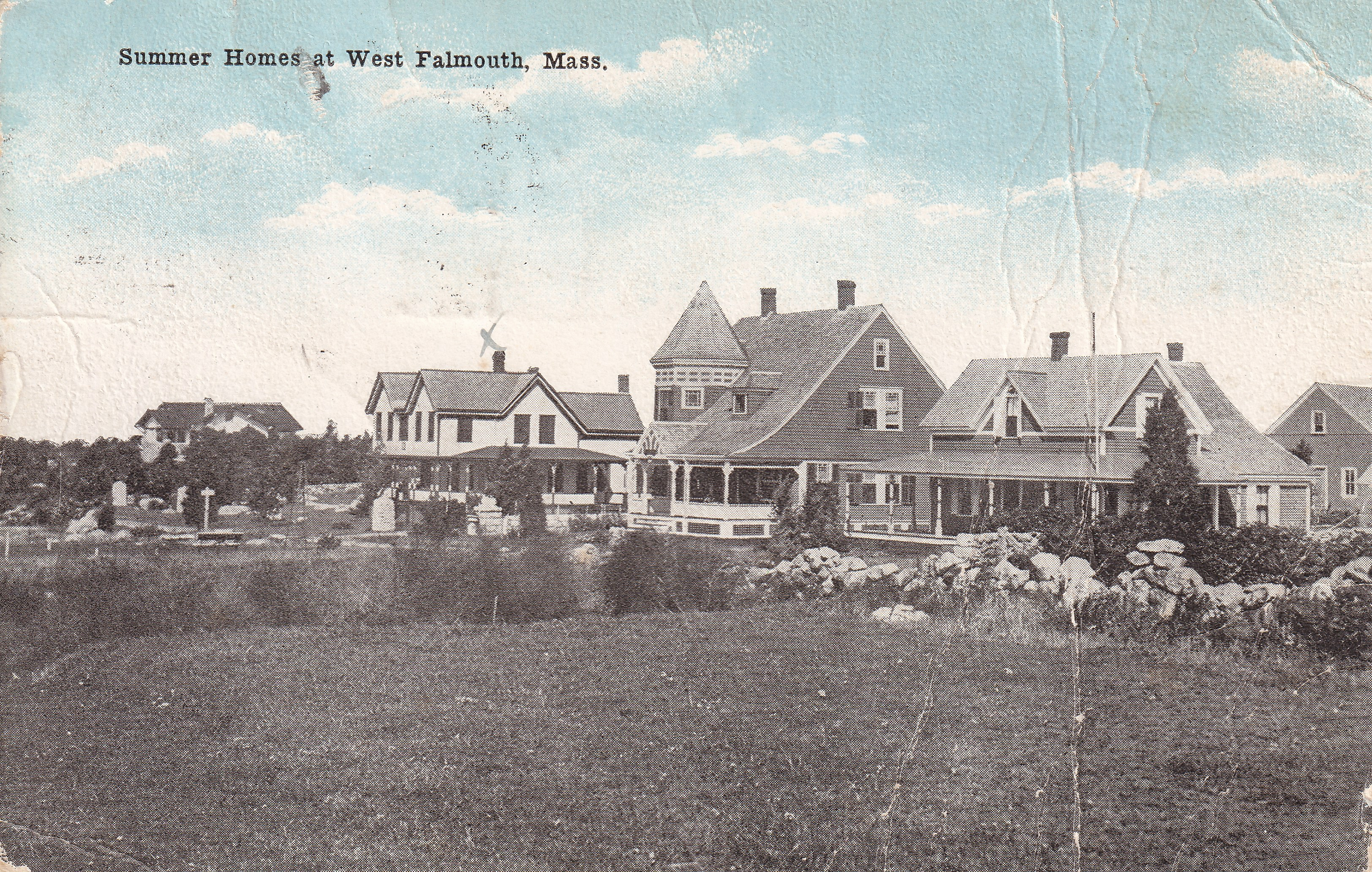
Little Island Road, West Falmouth, Massachusetts circa 1910

West Falmouth is a census-designated place (CDP) in the town of Falmouth in Barnstable County, Massachusetts, United States. As of the 2020 census, West Falmouth had a population of 1,812.

West Falmouth Village Historic District is at the heart of West Falmouth Village. Historic buildings include the West Falmouth Library, Quaker Meeting House and Quaker Carriage Sheds, Emerson House, the West Falmouth Fire Station, and numerous historic houses. Other nearby attractions include the Shining Sea Bikeway, the public beach at Chapoquoit Beach, West Falmouth Harbor, Bourne Farm, Great Sippewissett Marsh, Swift Playground on Blacksmith Shop Road, and the Mock Moraine conservation area. There are several restaurants, markets, inns, real estate agents, and shops in West Falmouth, as well as a post office.

== Geography ==
West Falmouth is located in the west-central part of the town of Falmouth at 41°35′59″N 70°38′16″W (41.599628, -70.637812). It is bordered to the north by North Falmouth, to the east by Massachusetts Route 28, to the south by Little Sippewisset Marsh, and to the west by Buzzards Bay.

According to the United States Census Bureau, the West Falmouth CDP has a total area of 4.4 square miles (11.3 km^{2}), of which 3.1 square miles (8.0 km^{2}) is land and 1.3 square miles (3.3 km^{2}) (29.32%) is water.

== Demographics ==
Historical population
Census	Pop.	Note	%±
2020	1,812		—
U.S. Decennial Census

=== 2020 census ===
As of the 2020 census, West Falmouth had a population of 1,812. The median age was 58.9 years. 11.8% of residents were under the age of 18 and 40.0% of residents were 65 years of age or older. For every 100 females there were 83.8 males, and for every 100 females age 18 and over there were 83.2 males age 18 and over.

100.0% of residents lived in urban areas, while 0.0% lived in rural areas.

There were 822 households in West Falmouth, of which 14.6% had children under the age of 18 living in them. Of all households, 54.7% were married-couple households, 11.9% were households with a male householder and no spouse or partner present, and 28.8% were households with a female householder and no spouse or partner present. About 27.4% of all households were made up of individuals and 17.2% had someone living alone who was 65 years of age or older.

There were 1,497 housing units, of which 45.1% were vacant. The homeowner vacancy rate was 0.6% and the rental vacancy rate was 6.3%.

Racial composition as of the 2020 census
Race	Number	Percent
White	1,670	92.2%
Black or African American	12	0.7%
American Indian and Alaska Native	10	0.6%
Asian	25	1.4%
Native Hawaiian and Other Pacific Islander	0	0.0%
Some other race	10	0.6%
Two or more races	85	4.7%
Hispanic or Latino (of any race)	36	2.0%

=== 2000 census ===
As of the 2000 census, there were 1,867 people, 835 households, and 558 families residing in the CDP. The population density was 228.1/km^{2} (590.8/mi^{2}). There were 1,278 housing units at an average density of 156.2/km^{2} (404.4/mi^{2}). The racial makeup of the CDP was 97.86% White, 0.43% African American, 0.05% Native American, 0.70% Asian, 0.32% from other races, and 0.64% from two or more races. Hispanic or Latino of any race were 0.86% of the population.

There were 835 households, out of which 19.6% had children under the age of 18 living with them, 58.9% were married couples living together, 7.1% had a female householder with no husband present, and 33.1% were non-families. 27.9% of all households were made up of individuals, and 12.5% had someone living alone who was 65 years of age or older. The average household size was 2.21 and the average family size was 2.66.

In the CDP, the population was spread out, with 17.5% under the age of 18, 3.6% from 18 to 24, 20.3% from 25 to 44, 34.2% from 45 to 64, and 24.4% who were 65 years of age or older. The median age was 50 years. For every 100 females, there were 88.4 males. For every 100 females age 18 and over, there were 84.6 males.

The median income for a household in the CDP was $72,703, and the median income for a family was $84,368. Males had a median income of $56,250 versus $42,250 for females. The per capita income for the CDP was $42,159. None of the families and 2.1% of the population were living below the poverty line, including no under eighteens and none of those over 64.

== Arts and entertainment ==
Since 1975, West Falmouth has been the home of The College Light Opera Company, a not-for-profit educational summer stock theatre company which resides at Bridgefields Hall.
