= Amanda McGonigle =

American marketer, activist, and social media influencer

- Born: 1988-1989; Milton, Massachusetts
- Occupations: Influencer, marketer, activist

Amanda McGonigle (born 1988 or 1989), better known by her social media name Cats on a Couch, is an American social media influencer, activist, and marketing professional. She is best known for her politically-focused social media content. In July 2026, she sued U.S. Vice President JD Vance, alleging First Amendment violations, after she was allegedly banned from his events due to her posts.

== Biography ==
McGonigle is originally from Milton, Massachusetts. At age 13, she interned at the Massachusetts State House. She went on to earn a degree in marketing, work as a Chief Revenue Officer at a software company and own her own marketing firm.

She created an Instagram account titled CatsOnACouch in the summer of 2024: she has stated the title comes from the combination of U.S. Vice President JD Vance's comments regarding "childless cat ladies" and the hoax regarding his couch. She has stated that the goal of her accounts was to have more followers than Vance and to "troll him mercilessly every single day". She also features social justice and mutual aid on her posts.

She organized and led a protest, dubbed "Meowtucket", against Vance's visit to Nantucket for a Republican National Committee meeting in 2025.

In 2026, she attempted to attend a Vance event at the Bangor International Airport, which she had registered for, in order to "tell him to his face that I think they're hurting our country and hurting our black and brown communities and... queer youth". However, she was turned away at the door. She stated that this was because of her political leanings. She instead protested. She then announced she would be suing Vance for what she has alleged constituted violations of the first amendment, alleging that she was turned away due to her comments and viewpoints from both this event and an additional event in Iowa. This was announced in a statement by the ACLU that has been described as "pun-filled".

She has stated that she has been in communication with the teams of Hakeem Jeffries and Cory Booker, among others.

She moved to Falmouth, Massachusetts in 2019, and ran for School Committee in 2025. She didn't win, but filed forms to run again in 2026. She also co-wrote a children's book about kindness and inclusion with her 10-year-old daughter.
