= Falmouth Village Green Historic District =

Historic district in Massachusetts, United States

- U.S. National Register of Historic Places
- U.S. Historic district
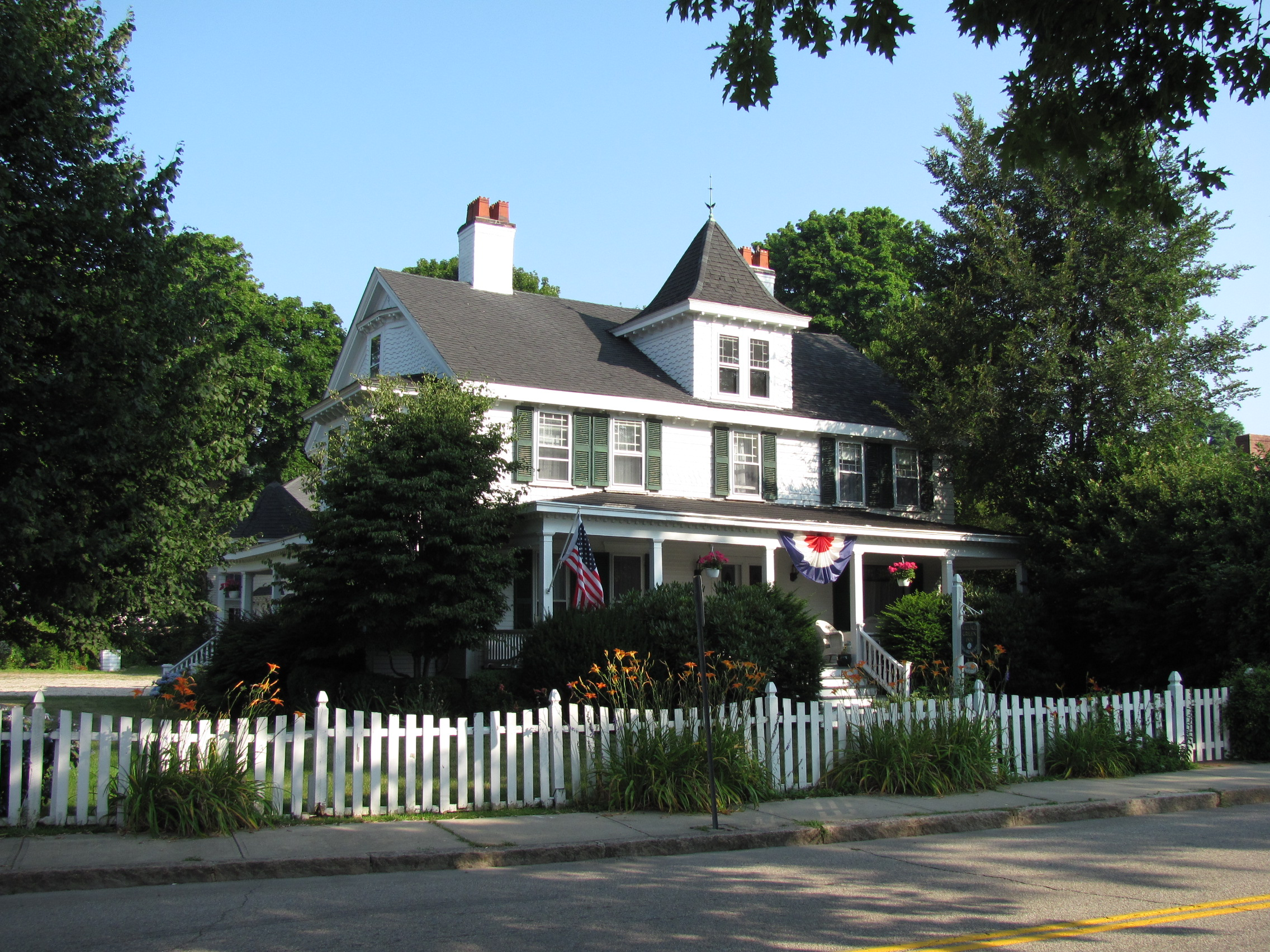
- Village Green Inn

- Location within Cape Cod Location within Massachusetts Location within the United States
- Location: Falmouth, Massachusetts
- Coordinates: 41°33′6″N 70°37′22″W
- Architect: Henry Vaughan; Frederick Law Olmsted
- Architectural style: Georgian, Federal, Late Victorian
- NRHP reference No.: 96000271
- Added to NRHP: March 27, 1996

The Falmouth Village Green Historic District is a historic district encompassing the historic village center of Falmouth, Massachusetts. It is centered on the triangular village green formed by Main Street, West Main Street, and Hewins Street, and extends south on Locust Street to the Old Town Cemetery. This area has been the town center since 1756, and is architecturally dominated by late Colonial and Federal period buildings. The district was added to the National Register of Historic Places in 1996.

== Description and history ==
The town of Falmouth was settled in about 1660, but was not set off from Barnstable until 1686. Its first town center was about 0.75 miles (1.21 km) south of the present green, and the 1756 relocation of the meeting house to this area was the subject of much debate. This move spurred the construction of houses along what is now Locust Street, which connected the new center to the south coast, and adjacent to the meeting house, where seven houses survive from that period. Of particular note are the Museums on the Green, owned and operated by the Falmouth Historical Society, with two historic houses and an exhibit center presenting the history of Falmouth, in a setting of gardens by the Falmouth Garden Club. The First Congregational Church, built in 1796, was originally located on the green, but was moved to its north side in 1858. Its belfry houses a bell manufactured by Paul Revere. The green continues to be a major gathering place for civic functions.

Initially an agricultural community, maritime economic activity became more important in Falmouth the late 18th and early 19th century. Between the 1850s and 1870s a number of Italianate houses were built, typically by ship's captains or other associated with maritime trades. Later buildings are more reflective of the area's transformation around the turn of the 20th century into a summer resort area, including the Queen's Buyway, a 1925 series of Colonial Revival shops on Palmer Avenue.

== Gallery ==
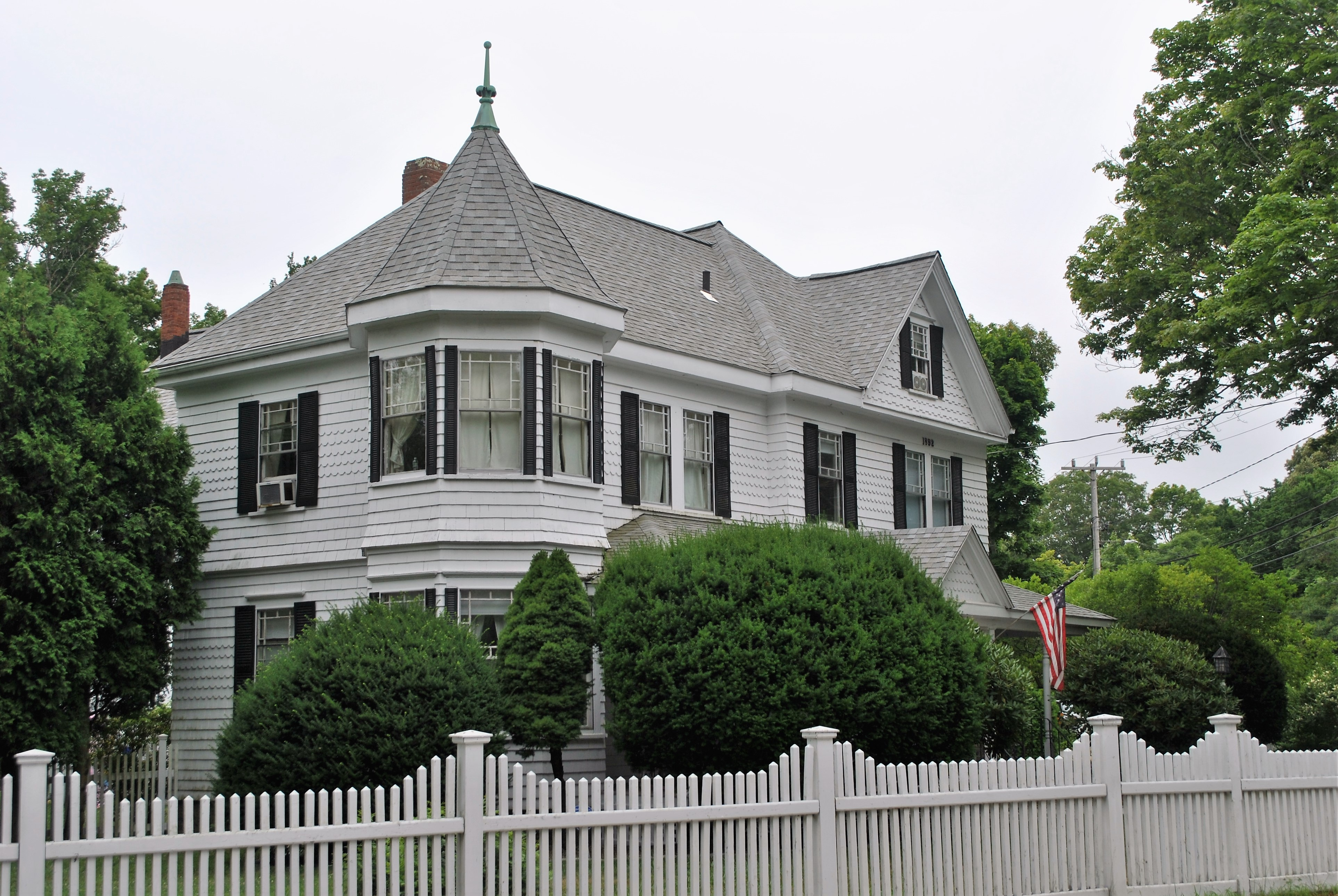
Falmouth Village Green Historic District

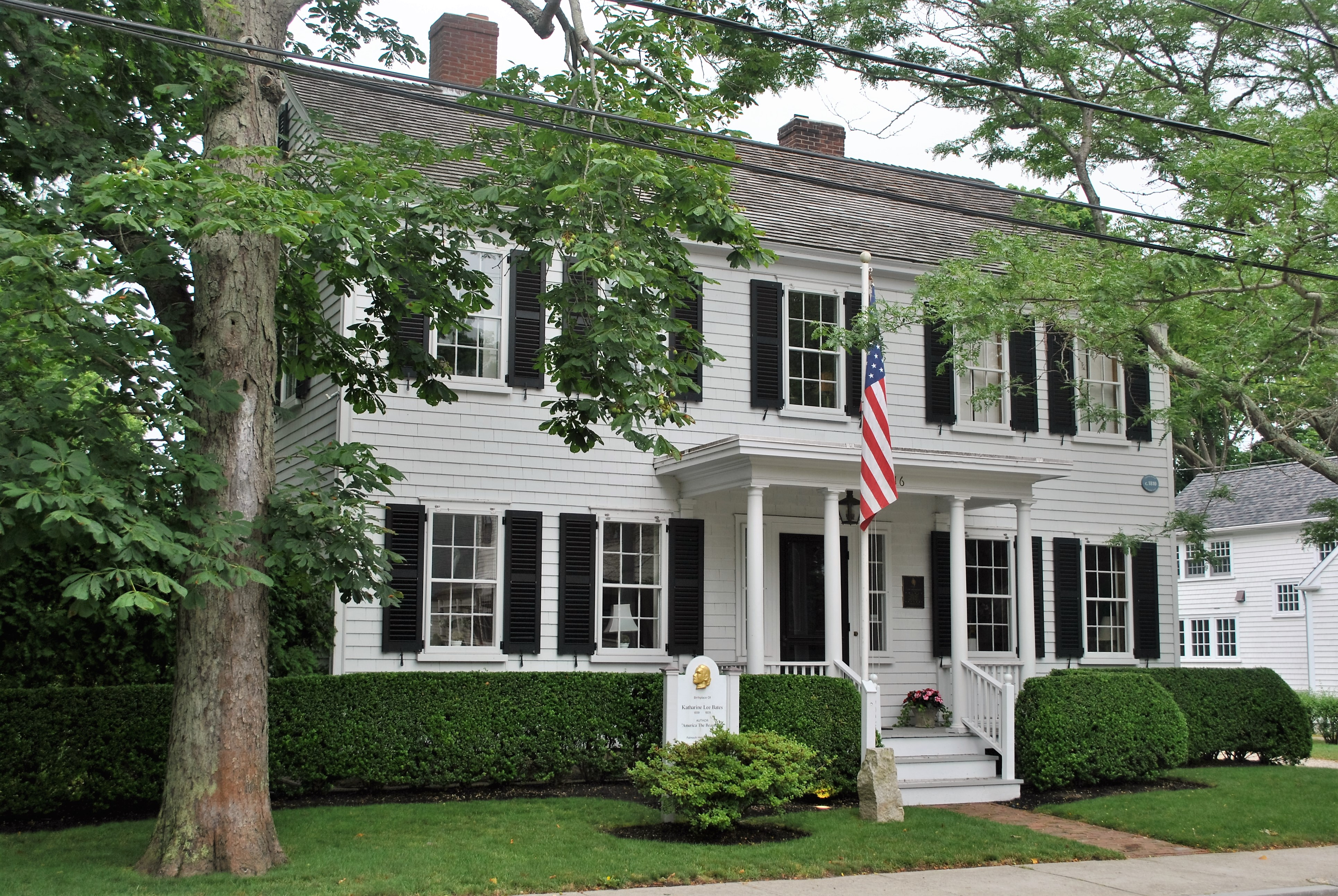
Katherine Lee Bates House

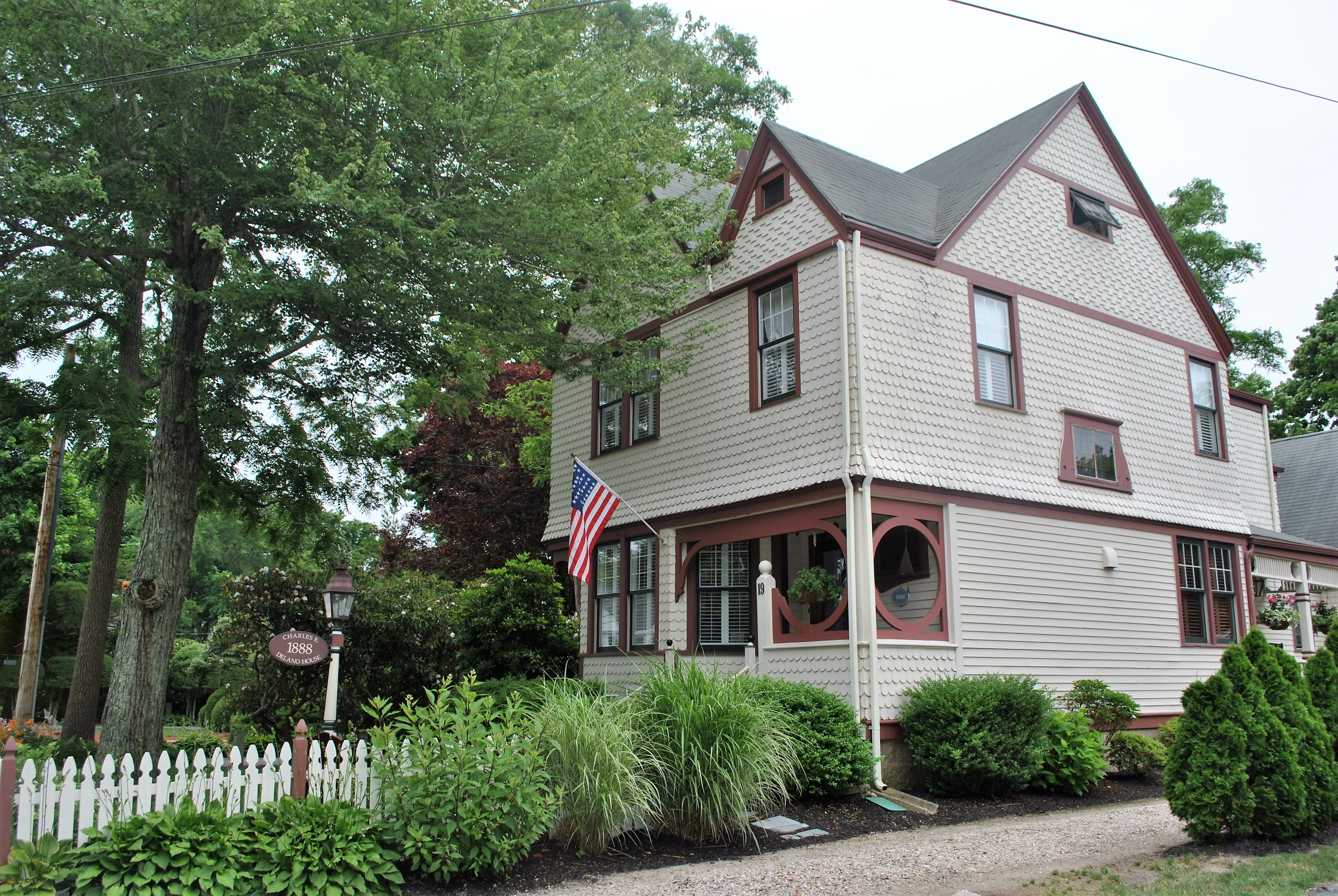
Charles E. Delano House, 1888

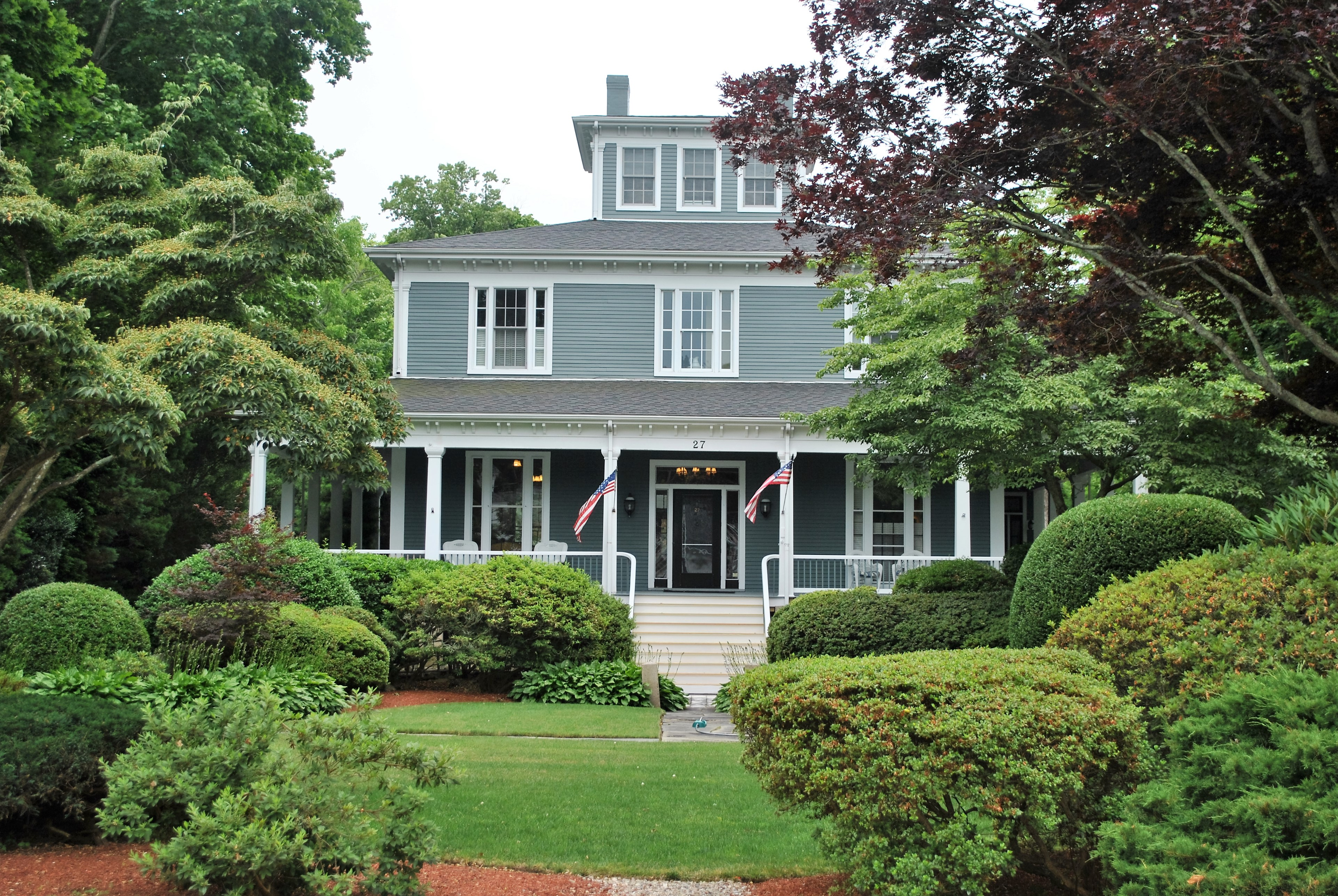
The Captain's Manor Inn, 1849

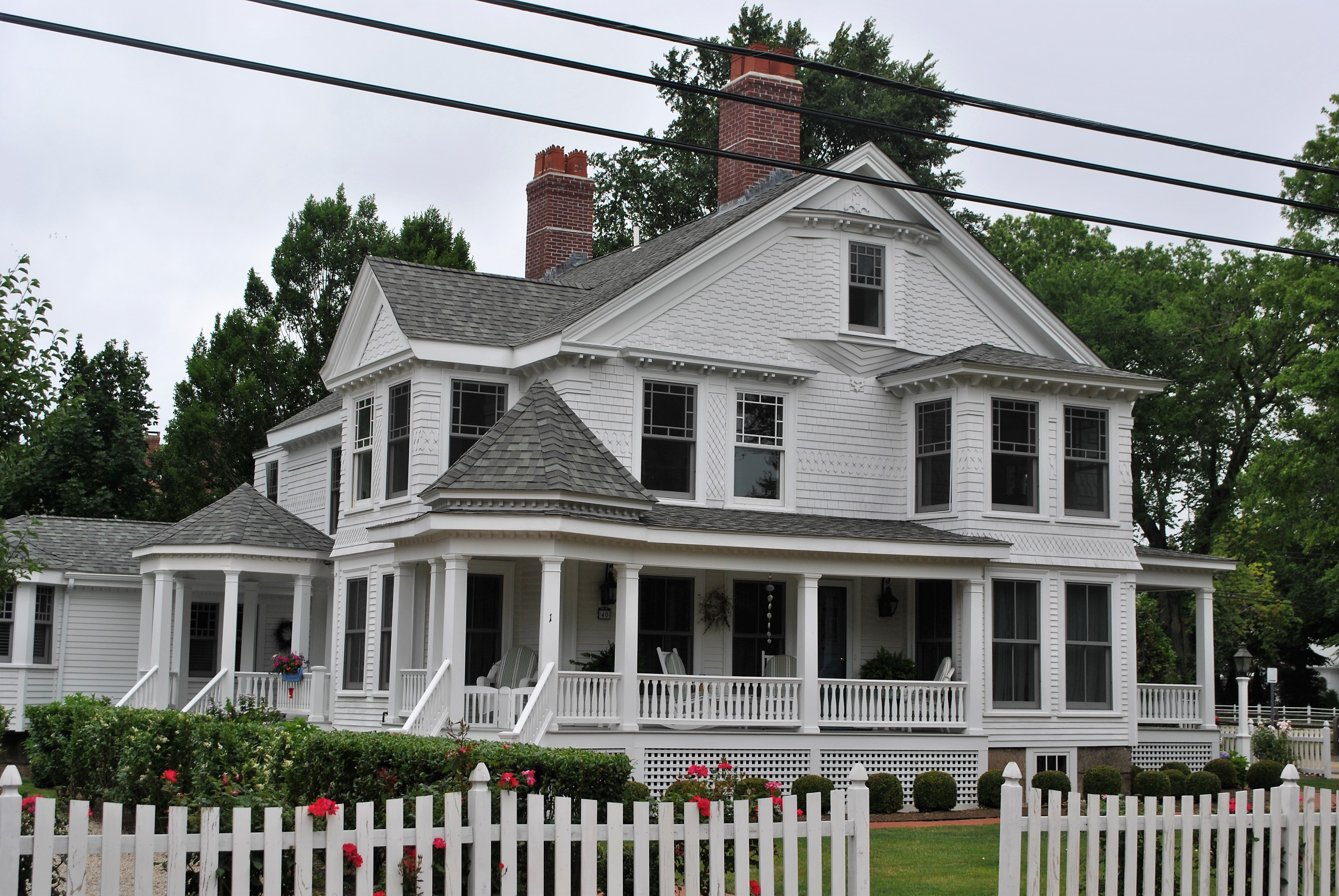
Falmouth Village Green Historic District

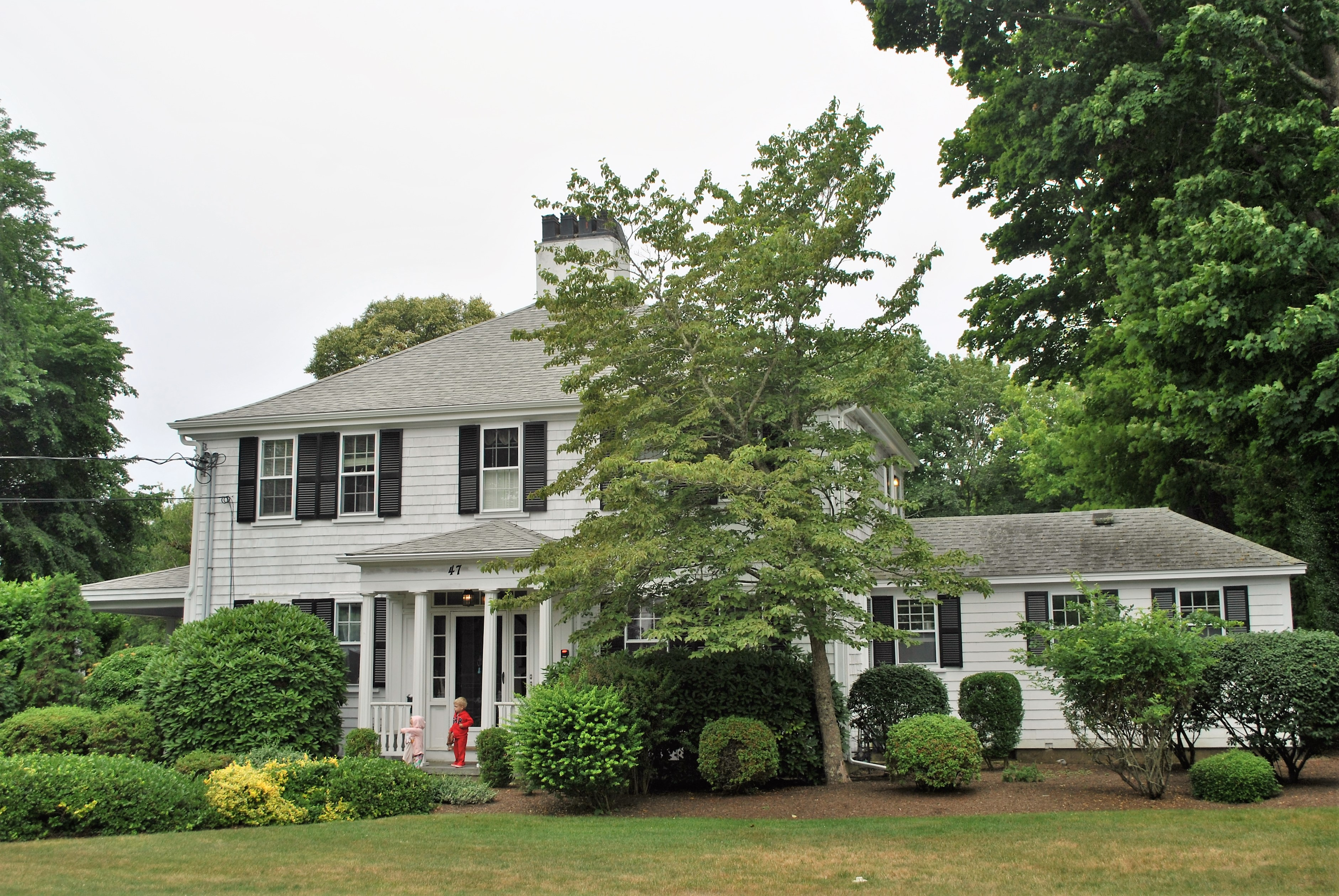
Consider Hatch House, 1748

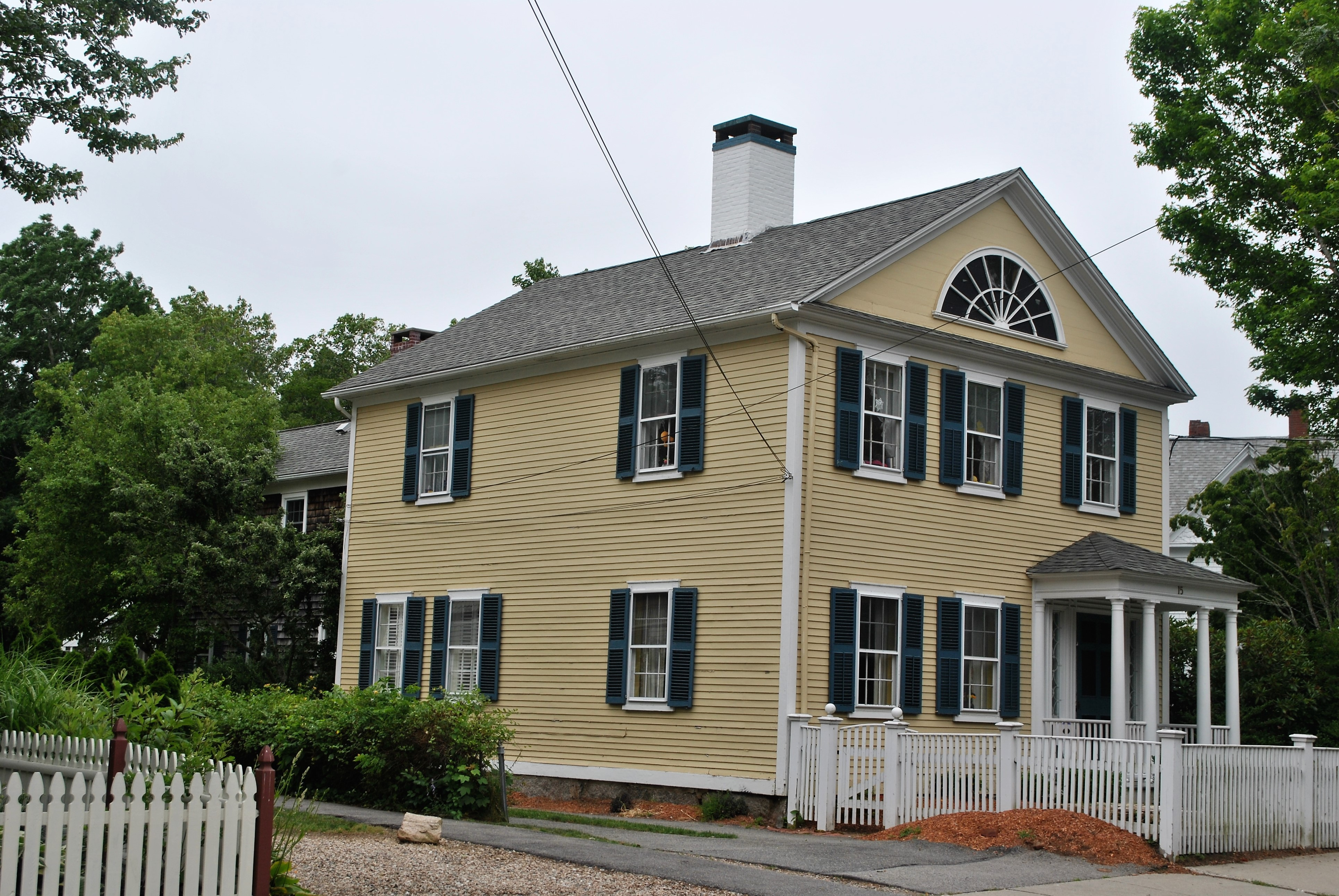
Falmouth Village Green Historic District

== See also ==
- National Register of Historic Places listings in Barnstable County, Massachusetts
