= North Falmouth, Massachusetts =

- Census-designated place
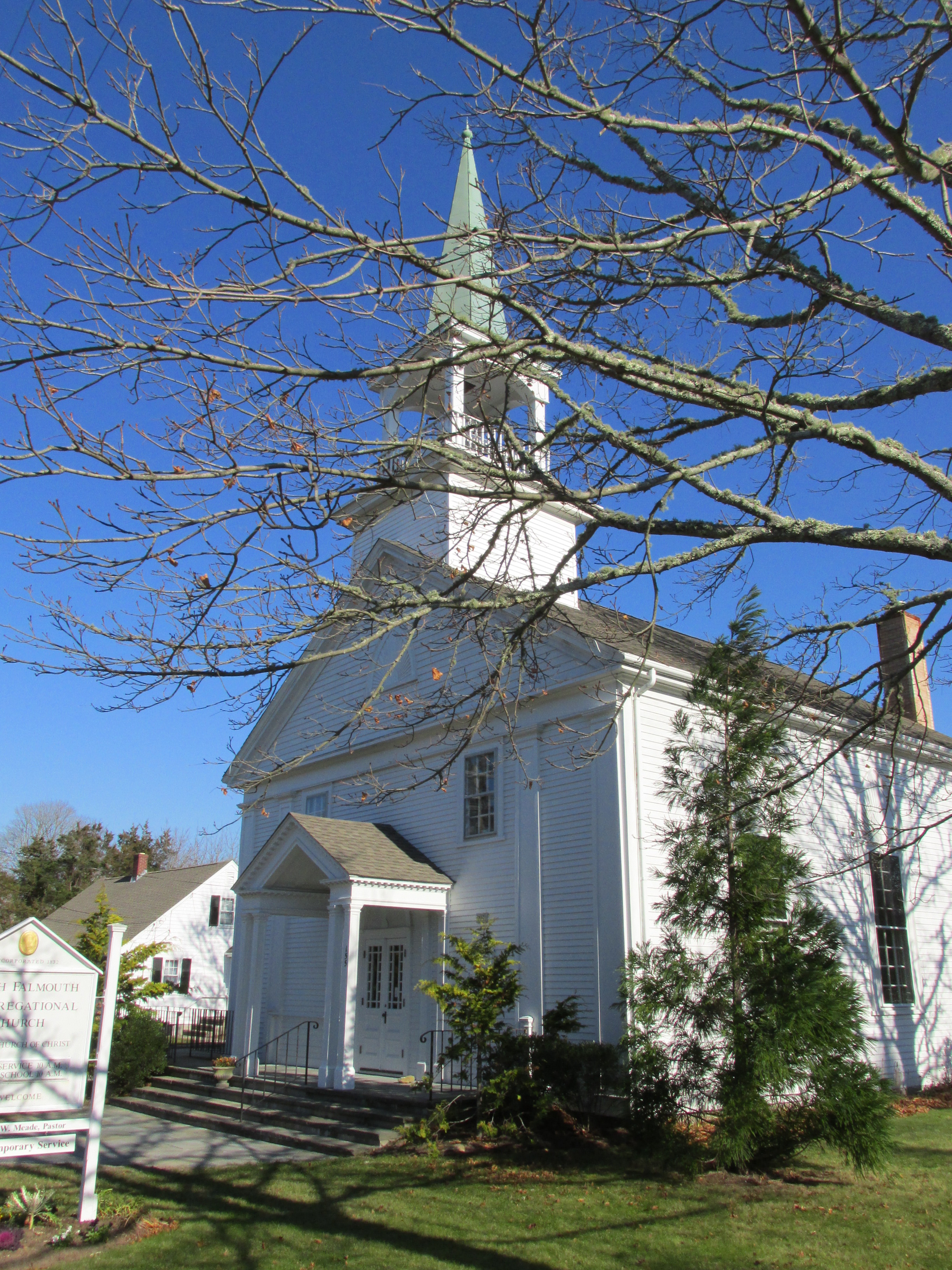
- Congregational Church

- Location in Barnstable County and the state of Massachusetts.
- Coordinates: 41°38′41″N 70°37′50″W
- Country: United States
- State: Massachusetts
- County: Barnstable
- Town: Falmouth

Area
  - Total: 6.61 sq mi (17.13 km^{2})
  - Land: 3.89 sq mi (10.08 km^{2})
  - Water: 2.72 sq mi (7.05 km^{2})
- Elevation: 43 ft (13 m)

Population (2020)
  - Total: 3,293
  - Density: 846.0/sq mi (326.63/km^{2})
- Time zone: UTC-5 (Eastern (EST))
  - Summer (DST): UTC-4 (EDT)
- ZIP Code: 02556
- Area codes: 508 & 774
- FIPS code: 25-47730
- GNIS feature ID: 0616438

North Falmouth is a census-designated place (CDP) in the town of Falmouth in Barnstable County, Massachusetts, United States. As of the 2020 census, North Falmouth had a population of 3,293.

== Geography ==
North Falmouth is located next to the northern border of Falmouth at 41°38′41″N 70°37′50″W. It is bordered by the town of Bourne to the north, by Massachusetts Route 28 to the east, West Falmouth to the south, and Buzzards Bay to the west.

North Falmouth has many beaches, although many are enclosed by private beach communities. Old Silver Beach is a public beach off Quaker Road next to the Sea Crest Beach Hotel. New Silver Beach, Sea Scape Beach, and Wild Harbor Estates Beach are examples of the small, private beach communities. Megansett Beach is the other public beach in North Falmouth, edged by Megansett Harbor.

The North Falmouth Village Historic District is along Old Main Road south of Wild Harbor Road. North Falmouth village has many businesses centrally located, including a bank, convenience stores, a church, gas station, hardware store, beauty parlor, yoga studio, dog grooming, ice cream parlor, restaurants, library, playgrounds and elementary school.

The north end of the Shining Sea Bikeway is located in North Falmouth at the former site of the North Falmouth Railroad Station.

According to the United States Census Bureau, the CDP has a total area of 6.6 square miles (17.1 km^{2}), of which 3.9 square miles (10.1 km^{2}) is land, and 2.7 square miles (7.0 km^{2}) (40.98%) is water.

== Demographics ==
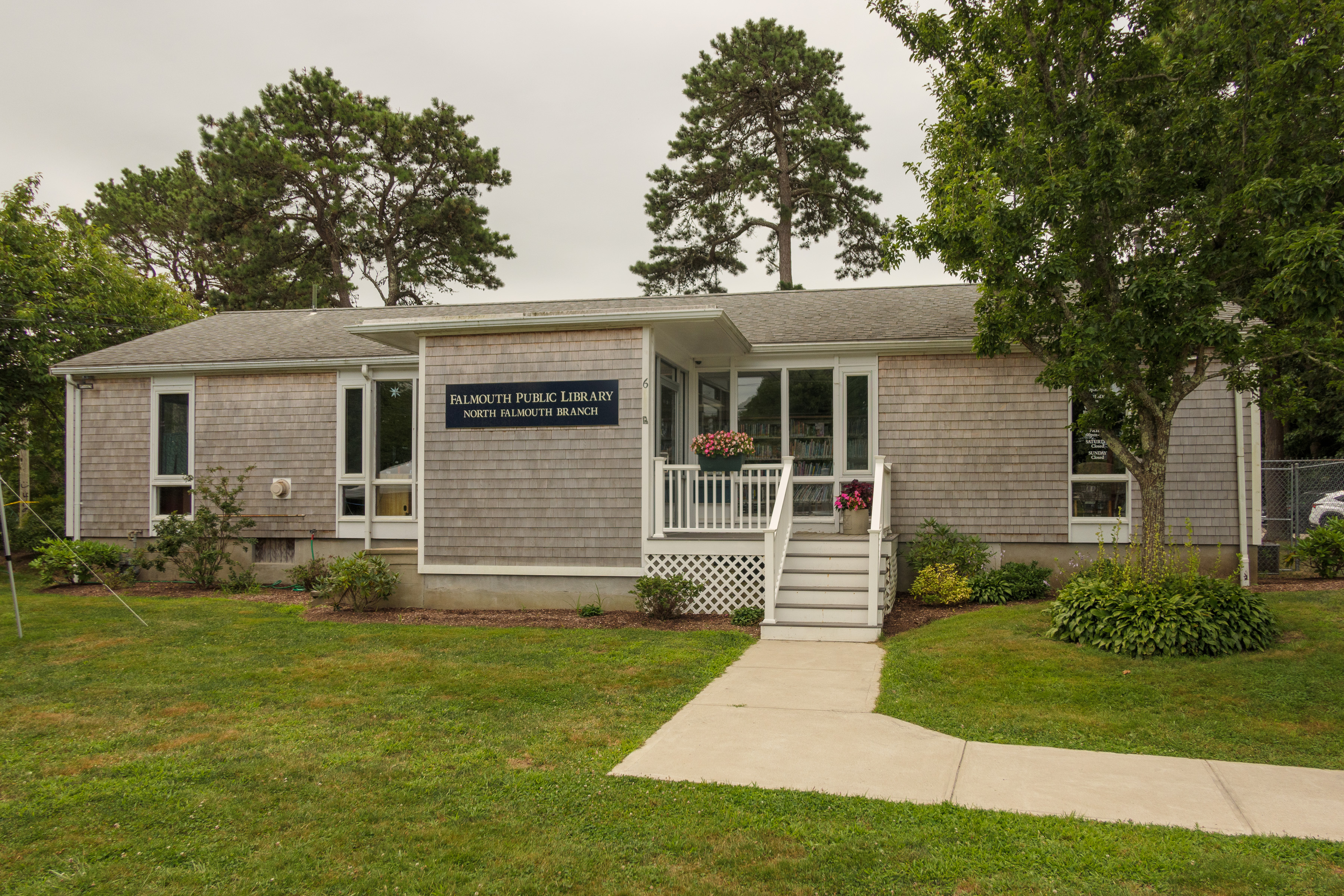
Library

Historical population
Census	Pop.	Note	%±
2020	3,293		—
U.S. Decennial Census

=== 2020 census ===
As of the 2020 census, North Falmouth had a population of 3,293. The median age was 58.6 years. 14.2% of residents were under the age of 18 and 37.1% of residents were 65 years of age or older. For every 100 females there were 85.6 males, and for every 100 females age 18 and over there were 84.8 males age 18 and over.

99.7% of residents lived in urban areas, while 0.3% lived in rural areas.

There were 1,497 households in North Falmouth, of which 17.2% had children under the age of 18 living in them. Of all households, 54.6% were married-couple households, 13.4% were households with a male householder and no spouse or partner present, and 27.7% were households with a female householder and no spouse or partner present. About 30.9% of all households were made up of individuals and 19.3% had someone living alone who was 65 years of age or older.

There were 2,644 housing units, of which 43.4% were vacant. The homeowner vacancy rate was 1.1% and the rental vacancy rate was 20.4%.

Racial composition as of the 2020 census
Race	Number	Percent
White	3,024	91.8%
Black or African American	28	0.9%
American Indian and Alaska Native	0	0.0%
Asian	53	1.6%
Native Hawaiian and Other Pacific Islander	1	0.0%
Some other race	16	0.5%
Two or more races	171	5.2%
Hispanic or Latino (of any race)	72	2.2%

=== 2000 census ===
As of the census of 2000, there were 3,355 people, 1,364 households, and 975 families residing in the CDP. The population density was 327.9/km^{2} (848.4/mi^{2}). There were 2,393 housing units at an average density of 233.9/km^{2} (605.1/mi^{2}). The racial makeup of the CDP was 95.95% White, 1.04% African American, 0.15% Native American, 0.83% Asian, 0.92% from other races, and 1.10% from two or more races. Hispanic or Latino of any race were 0.92% of the population.

There were 1,364 households, out of which 26.2% had children under the age of 18 living with them, 62.7% were married couples living together, 7.1% had a female householder with no husband present, and 28.5% were non-families. 25.4% of all households were made up of individuals, and 12.3% had someone living alone who was 65 years of age or older. The average household size was 2.37 and the average family size was 2.84.

In the CDP, the population was spread out, with 20.8% under the age of 18, 4.0% from 18 to 24, 20.7% from 25 to 44, 31.4% from 45 to 64, and 23.0% who were 65 years of age or older. The median age was 48 years. For every 100 females, there were 87.3 males. For every 100 females age 18 and over, there were 85.6 males.

The median income for a household in the CDP was $57,841, and the median income for a family was $74,458. Males had a median income of $53,125 versus $35,417 for females. The per capita income for the CDP was $31,462. About 2.9% of families and 4.9% of the population were below the poverty line, including 8.3% of those under age 18 and 2.5% of those age 65 or over.

== Notable person ==
- Elvin Kabat (1914–2000), immunochemist, died in north Falmouth

== See also ==
- Falmouth, Massachusetts
- New Silver Beach
