= Crowell–Bourne Farm =

Historic house in Massachusetts, United States

- U.S. National Register of Historic Places
- U.S. Historic district – Contributing property
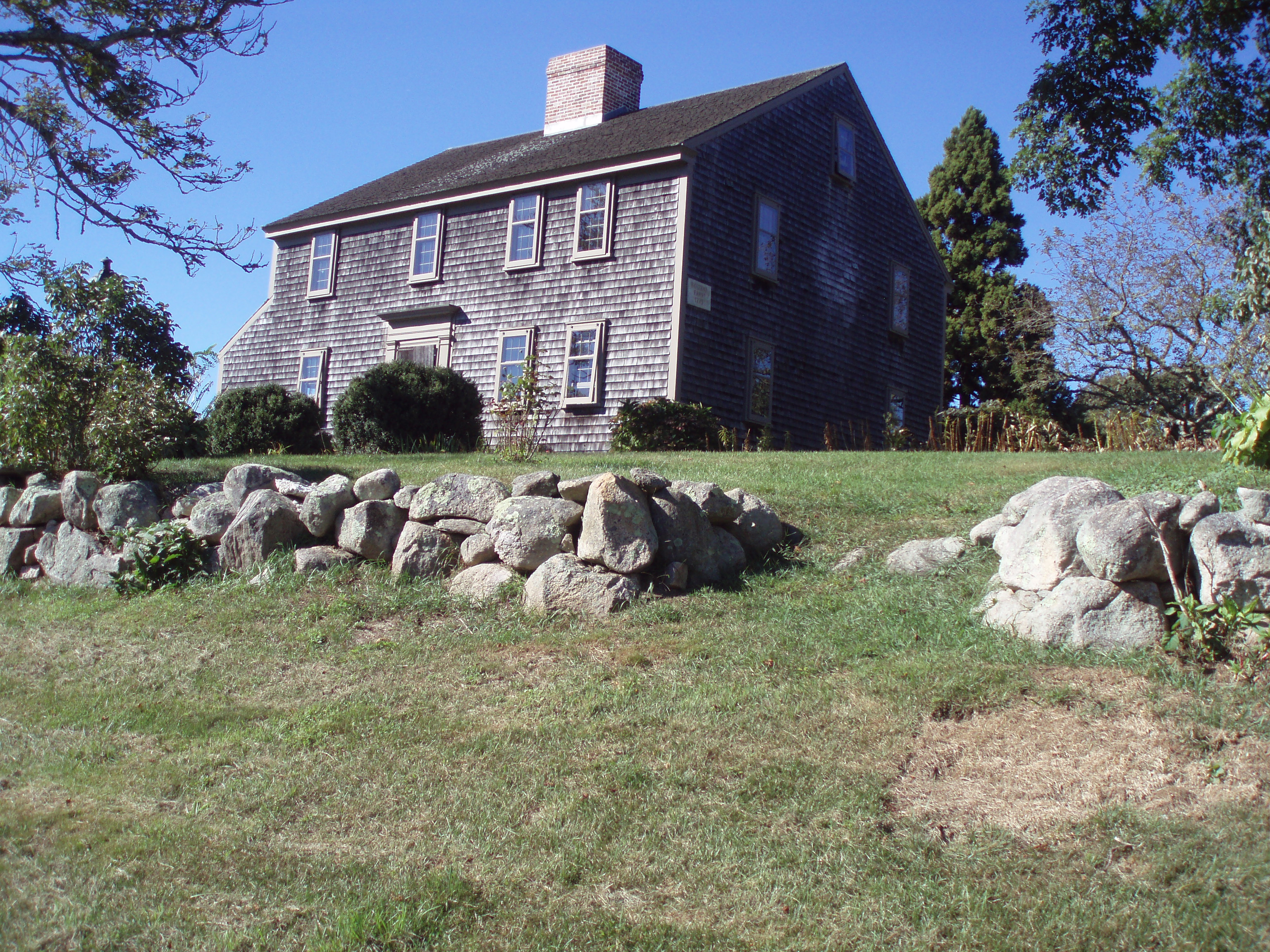
- Bourne Farm, 1775 farmhouse

- Location within Cape Cod Location within Massachusetts Location within the United States
- Location: West Falmouth, Massachusetts
- Coordinates: 41°37′4″N 70°37′34″W
- Built: 1775
- Architect: Joseph Crowell
- Part of: West Falmouth Village Historic District (ID98000253)
- NRHP reference No.: 80000501

Significant dates
- Added to NRHP: April 23, 1980
- Designated CP: April 2, 1998

The Crowell–Bourne Farm is a historic 1775 farmhouse on West Falmouth Highway (Route 28A) in West Falmouth, Massachusetts.

The farm has been owned and operated by Salt Pond Areas Bird Sanctuaries since 1979. The property has 49 acres of fields and woods with walking trails, and is open to the public. The Shining Sea Bikeway crosses the property on a paved former railroad bed. Of interest is an old cattle tunnel which was for herding livestock under the former railroad tracks.

The farm was listed on the National Register of Historic Places in 1980, and included in the West Falmouth Village Historic District in 1998.

== See also ==
- National Register of Historic Places listings in Barnstable County, Massachusetts
