= Paul and Madeleine Weidlinger House =

Historic house in Massachusetts, United States

- U.S. National Register of Historic Places
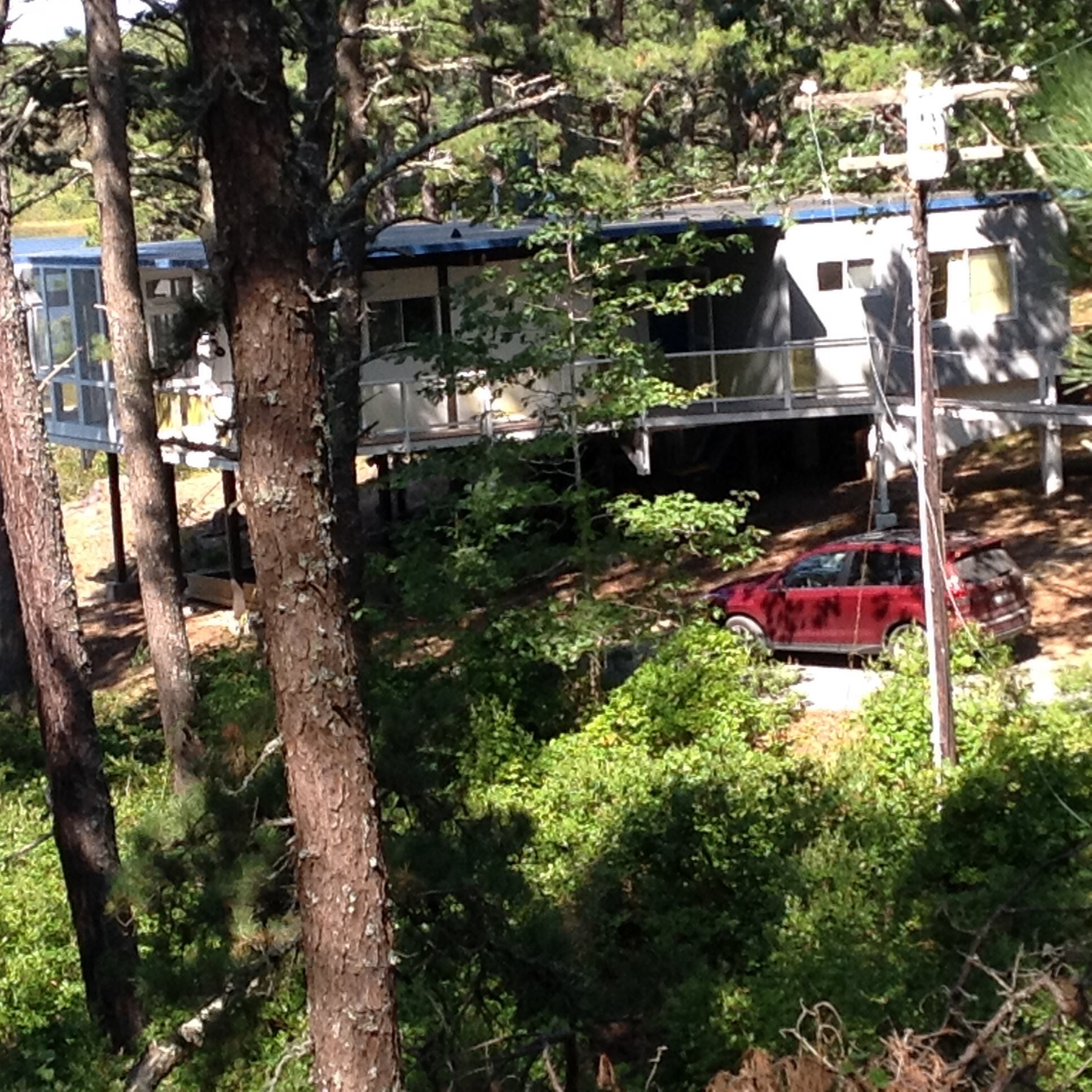

- Location within Cape Cod Location within Massachusetts Location within the United States
- Location: 54 Valley Road, Wellfleet, Massachusetts
- Coordinates: 41°57′40″N 70°0′20″W
- Built: 1954
- Architect: Paul Weidlinger
- Architectural style: Modern
- NRHP reference No.: 14000023
- Added to NRHP: February 25, 2014

The Paul and Madeleine Weidlinger House (also the Weidlinger House) is a historic house at 54 Valley Road in Wellfleet, Massachusetts. It is one of several surviving houses in Wellfleet that combine elements of Modern architecture with traditional Cape Cod architecture. The single story wood-frame house was built in 1954 by designer Paul Weidlinger (founder of Weidlinger Associates, a design firm) for his family's use. It is located on a steep grade overlooking Higgins Pond, with one end projecting over the grade. A deck wraps around three sides of the house, and large glass doors give views of the surrounding landscape. The house, which is within the bounds of the Cape Cod National Seashore, was donated to the National Park Service in 1973 by Madeleine Weidlinger. The house is the subject of a 2012 lease agreement between the Park Service and the Cape Cod Modern House Trust.

The house was listed on the National Register of Historic Places in 2014.

== See also ==
- National Register of Historic Places listings in Barnstable County, Massachusetts
- National Register of Historic Places listings in Cape Cod National Seashore
