= 945 Madison Avenue =

Museum building in New York City

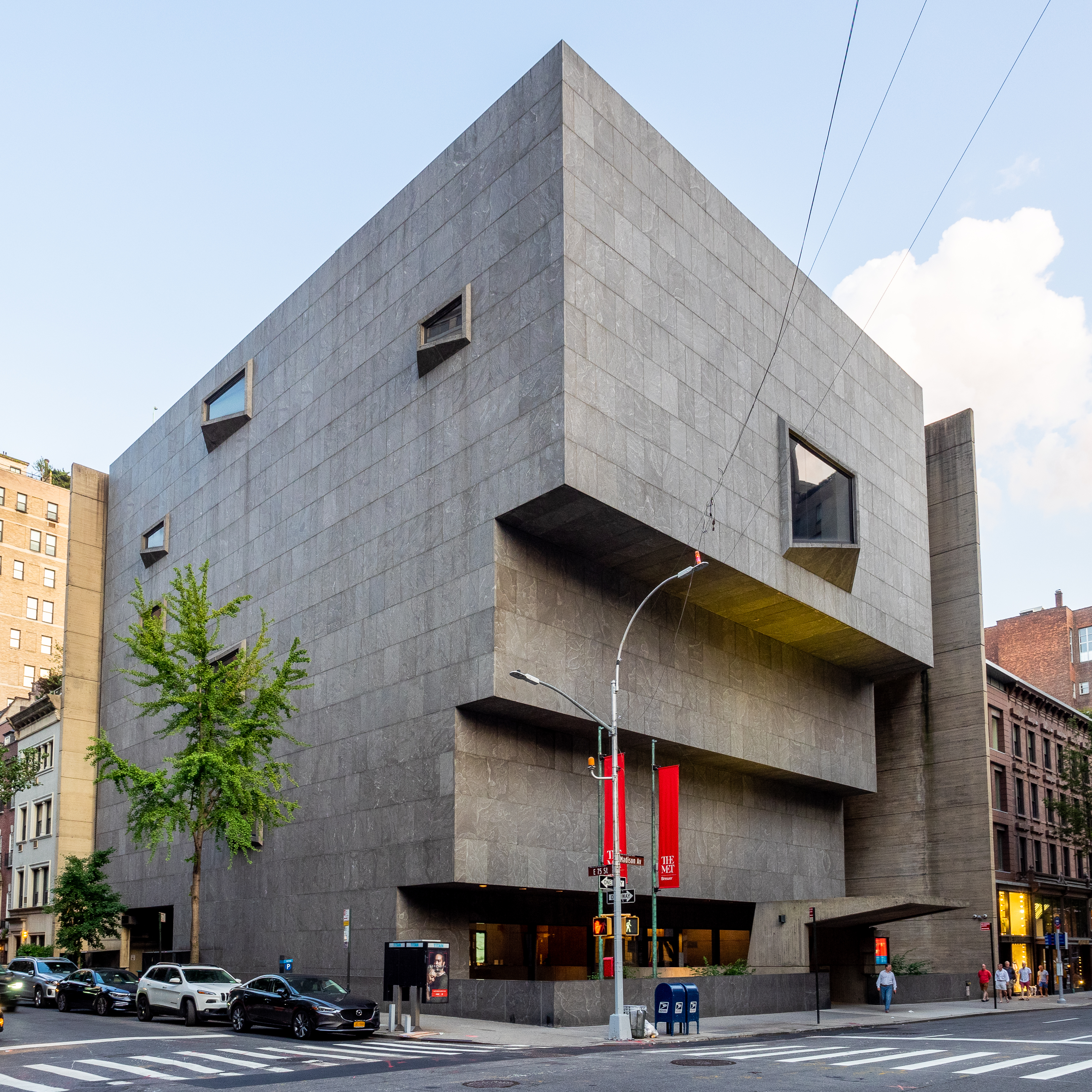
- The building in 2019, as the Met Breuer
- Former names: Whitney Museum Building
- Alternative names: Breuer Building

General information
- Architectural style: Brutalist, Modernist
- Location: 945 Madison Avenue, Manhattan, New York, United States
- Coordinates: 40.7734°N 73.9638°W
- Groundbreaking: October 20, 1964
- Opened: September 28, 1966
- Client: Whitney Museum
- Owner: Sotheby's
- Operator: Sotheby's

Technical details
- Floor count: 7 (5 above-ground)
- Floor area: 76,830 sq ft (7,138 m^{2})
- Grounds: 13,000 sq ft (1,200 m^{2})

Design and construction
- Architects: Marcel Breuer & Associates
- Structural engineer: Paul Weidlinger
- Main contractor: HRH Construction Corp.

Other information
- Public transit: Subway: at 77th Street; Bus: M1, M2, M3, M4, M79 SBS
- Interactive map

U.S. Historic district – Contributing property
- Designated: September 12, 2006
- Part of: Upper East Side Historic District boundary increase
- Reference no.: 06000822

New York City Landmark
- Designated: May 20, 2025
- Reference no.: 2685
- Designated entity: Exterior

New York City Landmark
- Designated: May 20, 2025
- Reference no.: 2686
- Designated entity: Lobby, basement, and main stairway interior

945 Madison Avenue, also known as the Breuer Building and formerly the Whitney Museum Building, is located on the Upper East Side of Manhattan, New York City. Built from 1964 to 1966 as the third home of the Whitney Museum of American Art, it subsequently held a branch of the Metropolitan Museum of Art and the Frick Collection before becoming the headquarters of Sotheby's auction house. Marcel Breuer and Hamilton P. Smith were the primary architects, with Michael H. Irving as the consulting architect and Paul Weidlinger as the structural engineer. 945 Madison Avenue was Breuer's most significant design in New York City and one of the most important of his career. It was also his first museum commission, and his first and only remaining work in Manhattan.

The building sits on a 13,000-square-foot (1,200 m^{2}) site at Madison Avenue and 75th Street that was once occupied by six 1880s rowhouses. The building is usually described as part of the Modernist art and architecture movement, and is often described as part of the narrower Brutalist style. The structure has exterior faces of variegated granite and exposed concrete and makes use of stark angular shapes, including cantilevered floors progressively extending atop its entryway, resembling an inverted ziggurat.

Ideas for the building began in the 1960s, when the Whitney Museum sought a new building three times the size of its existing facility. The Whitney occupied the building until 2014, during which, the surrounding area evolved from an elegant residential neighborhood to an upscale commercial hub. In 2016, the museum building was leased to the Metropolitan Museum of Art and became the Met Breuer; the new museum contributed to the neighborhood's transformation but closed in 2020. From 2021 to March 2024, the building became the Frick Madison, the temporary home of the Frick Collection while the Henry Clay Frick House underwent renovation. In 2023, Sotheby's purchased 945 Madison Avenue and announced plans to use the building as its global headquarters.

The design was controversial, though lauded by notable architecture critics at its opening. The building defined the Whitney Museum's image for nearly 50 years, influencing subsequent projects such as the Cleveland Museum of Art's north wing and Atlanta's Central Library. Breuer's design also influenced the new Whitney Museum building in Lower Manhattan by Renzo Piano, with both buildings featuring cantilevering floor plates and oversized elevators. The structure and surrounding buildings contribute to the Upper East Side Historic District, a New York City and national historic district, and the exterior and parts of the interior are New York City designated landmarks.

== Site ==
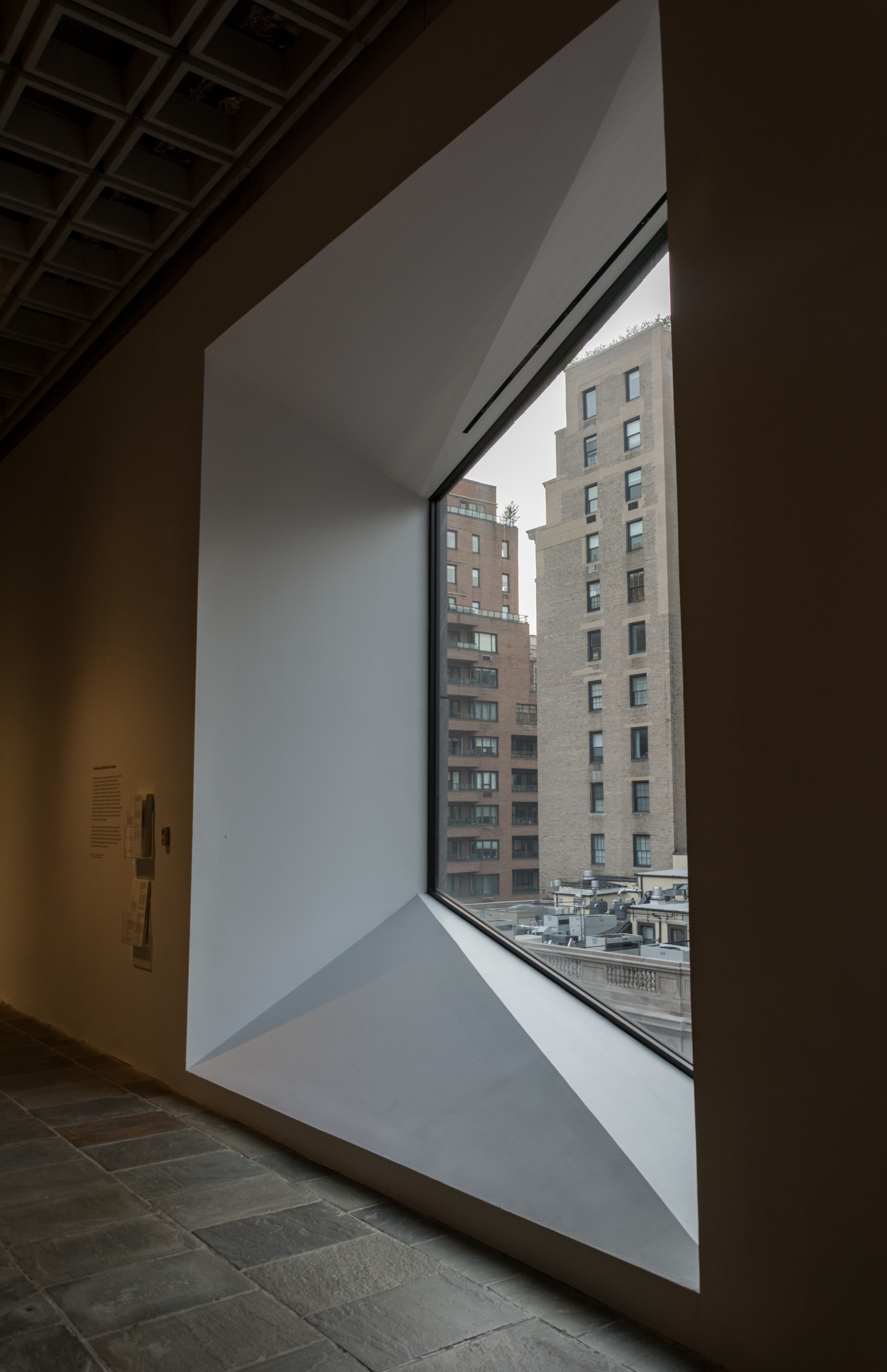
Window onto Madison Avenue

The museum building occupies the southeast corner of the intersection of Madison Avenue and 75th Street. The property is considered to be within the Lenox Hill neighborhood within the Upper East Side, one block east of Central Park, in Manhattan, New York City. The original building's site measures around 104 by 125 feet (32 by 38 m), occupying almost 13,000 square feet (1,200 m^{2}).

The site was formerly occupied by six 1880s rowhouses like those that surround it; they had been demolished before the museum purchased the property. The site was an elegant residential area before World War II; after the war, the area took on new luxury apartments and art dealers, becoming the "gallery center of New York". It became an upscale commercial area by the mid-2010s, surrounded by retail shops for global fashion brands, luxury condominiums, and a large Apple Store. The 21st-century site changes were partially attributed to development spurred by the Met Breuer's opening at the building in 2016.

== Architecture ==
945 Madison Avenue was designed for the Whitney Museum of American Art by Marcel Breuer & Associates – primarily Breuer himself and his partner Hamilton P. Smith. Michael H. Irving was the consulting architect, and Paul Weidlinger was the structural engineer. The work was the most significant in New York City for Breuer, and one of the most important of his career. It was his first museum commission, and his first and only remaining work in Manhattan. Breuer was originally a student of the Bauhaus architecture and design school, though he later became one of the leading figures in "New Brutalism" or Brutalism.

Sources variously describe the building's architectural style to be Brutalist or part of the larger Modernist movement. It has been associated with Brutalism due to its large top-heavy massing and its use of exposed raw concrete. The building's Brutalist features were noted by Ada Louise Huxtable in 1966 and Phaidon's Atlas of Brutalist Architecture, published in 2018. When the Metropolitan Museum of Art was a tenant of the building, the museum's curators discouraged the structure's association with Brutalism, saying that Breuer never associated himself with the style, and that contrary to the Brutalist aesthetic, 945 Madison had a colorful, yet subtle, spectrum of colors, and that it overall was supposed to engage visitors. The building's use of concrete was described by Sarah Williams Goldhagen as more of an ideological position than an aesthetic; Goldhagen stated that progressive architects at the time had to choose between using steel and glass or reinforced concrete, typically adhering to one design choice or the other. Steel and glass began to become associated with commercial buildings and mass production, while concrete gave the impression of monumentality, authenticity, and age.

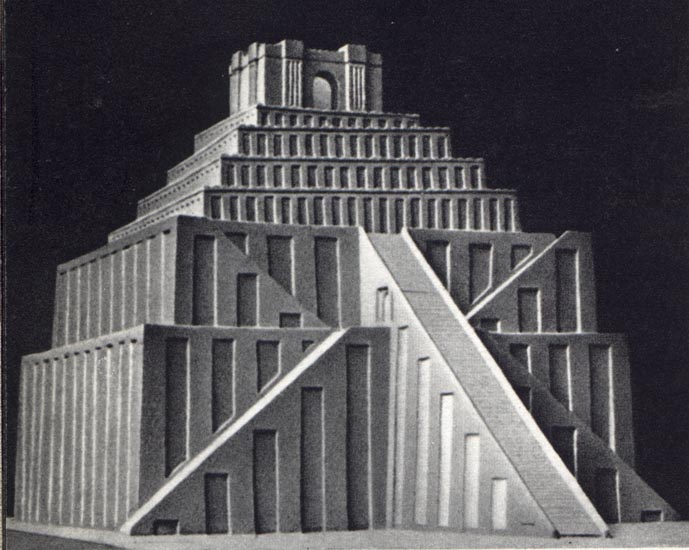
Model of the Sumerian ziggurat Etemenanki, based on the Tower of Babel stele

The design of the five-story building, as stated in 1964, was intended to counteract gravity as well as uniformity, poor lighting, crowded space, and a lack of identity (most of which were issues for the Whitney's prior spaces). The building utilizes "close-to-earth" materials that weather over time, intended to express age beautifully. Breuer chose coarse granite, split slate floors, bronze doors and fittings, and teakwood.

=== Exterior ===
==== Form ====
The structure includes a cantilevered facade on the building's western elevation facing Madison Avenue. As such, the upper-story galleries protrude farther from the ground-story facade as they rise, extending outward an additional 14 feet (4.3 m) at each level. The cantilevered facade functions as a portico, and the spaces underneath are illuminated at night. Breuer stated that the protrusions would help receive visitors before they enter the museum building, and he also intended that the massing would visually connect the building with the street by drawing onlookers' attention inward.

Breuer had described the protruding upper stories as bringing "attention to the museum and its special dedication", leading observers to compare the overall massing to an inverted ziggurat. When the building was finished, Progressive Architecture likened it to the stepped Pyramid of Djoser in Egypt. The southern end of the Madison Avenue elevation has only one cantilever, near the top of the facade, which is not as deep as the cantilevers elsewhere on the facade. The architectural historian Robert McCarter wrote that the interior layout was most heavily influenced by the differing west–east widths of each gallery floor, rather than by the museum's overall floor plan.

The building was designed in the spirit of the nearby Guggenheim Museum – another artistic landmark created by a renowned architect, completed seven years earlier. The Guggenheim also its basic form come from an overturned ziggurat, as its architect Frank Lloyd Wright had stated in a 1945 Time interview; architecture critics had noticed, calling the Whitney a "squared-off Guggenheim". Breuer designed the building in response to specific desires from the Whitney Museum – an "assertive, even 'controversial' presence that would announce the experimentation it sought within; a clear 'definition, even monumentality that was basic to [their] program'; but also a continued effort to be 'as human as possible,' to reflect the Whitney's tradition of warmth and intimacy" after years situated in Greenwich Village. In 1966, Breuer told Newsweek that "Maybe I built it to rebel against skyscrapers and brownstones".

==== Facade ====
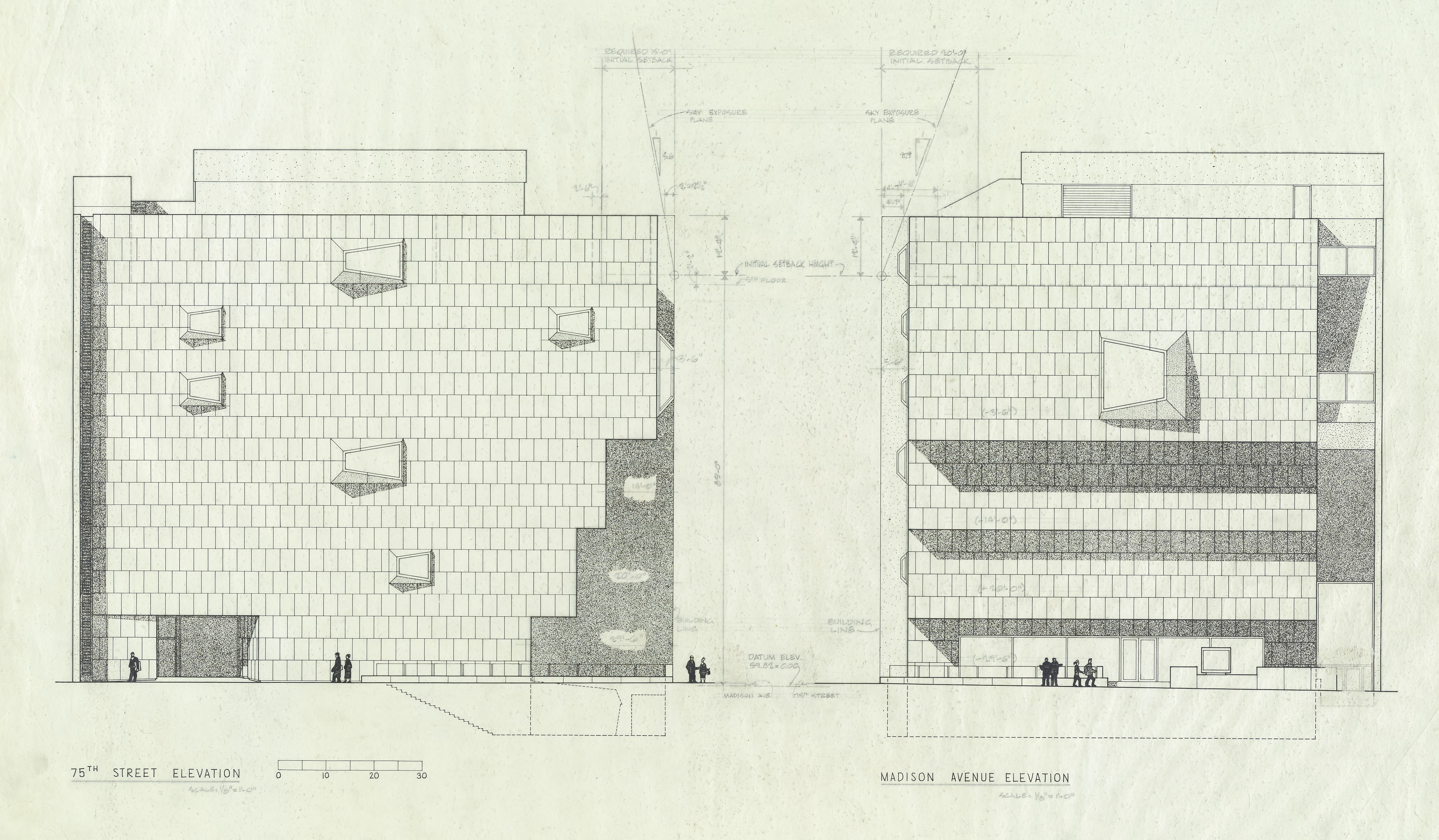
Architectural plan for the exterior, 1963

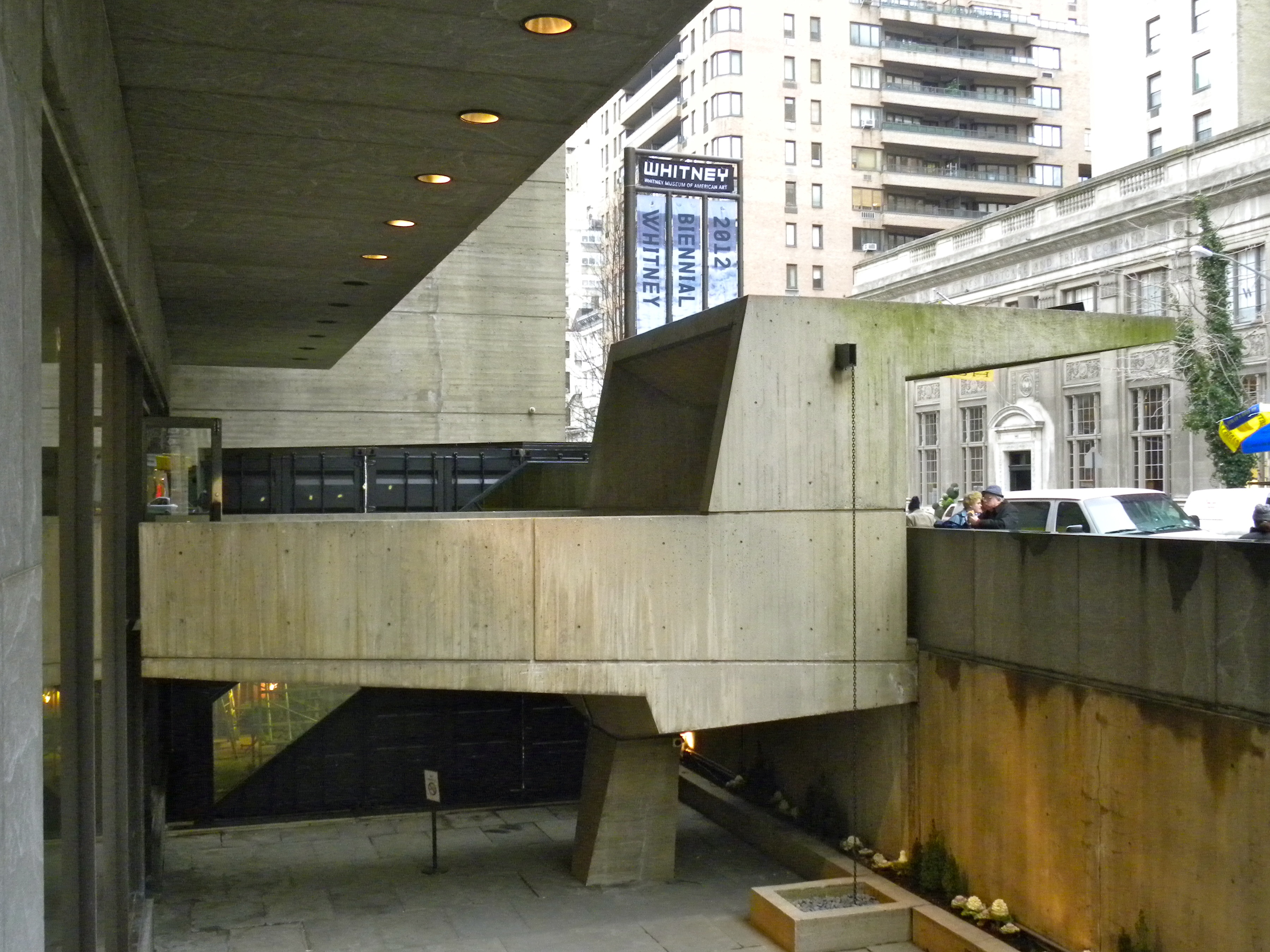
Bridge entrance from Madison Avenue

Unlike most other buildings on the adjacent stretch of Madison Avenue, the building's exterior is made of reinforced concrete with variegated gray granite cladding, which is divided into vertically-oriented slabs. The majority of the building is faced with dark gray granite, with white veining resembling curling smoke, and lacks decoration for the most part. There are 1,500 slabs of stone, each weighing 500–600 pounds (230–270 kg). The Madison Avenue elevation features an areaway or sunken stone courtyard (sometimes described as a moat), which was originally intended to display sculptures. Spanning the areaway is a canopied concrete bridge into the building's lobby, which Architectural Forum likened to a portal and sculpture. Adjacent to the southern end of the bridge is a concrete display case with a glass pane. The rest of the areaway is separated from the sidewalk by a granite parapet, which has two flagpoles along with planting beds. The southern end of the Madison Avenue elevation has concrete cladding (in contrast to the rest of the facade) and includes a service entrance. On 75th Street, there is another areaway, as well as a service entrance and loading dock at the eastern end. The areaway was rearranged in the 2020s.

The west side of the lower level and ground floor is almost fully faced in glass. Besides this, the building is predominantly windowless. The majority of the upper-floor windows are decorative and are meant to prevent claustrophobia, illuminating what the writer John Poros described as "incidental views". These trapezoidal windows jut out from the exterior walls and visually appear at random. The windows are set at angles from 20 to 25 degrees, pointed away from the path of the sun to avoid direct light from entering the building. The Madison Avenue elevation of the facade has only a single window of this design, an oversized cyclopean pane angled to the north. There are six such windows spread across the 75th Street elevation, all of which are tilted toward the west.

The north and south walls are load-bearing; the walls are all made of reinforced concrete. The party walls, on the building's south and east sides, are massive projecting walls of unadorned and rough reinforced concrete. The party walls, visible above the roofs of nearby row houses, are separated and distinct from the more elegant rest of the exterior. The north and west walls originally formed a parapet on the fifth floor, hiding the building's windowed office space from street view while bringing light into the space. Part of the uppermost cantilever on the Madison Avenue elevation can also be seen from the south. The roof is about 97 feet (30 m) high, similar in height to nearby structures.

=== Interior ===
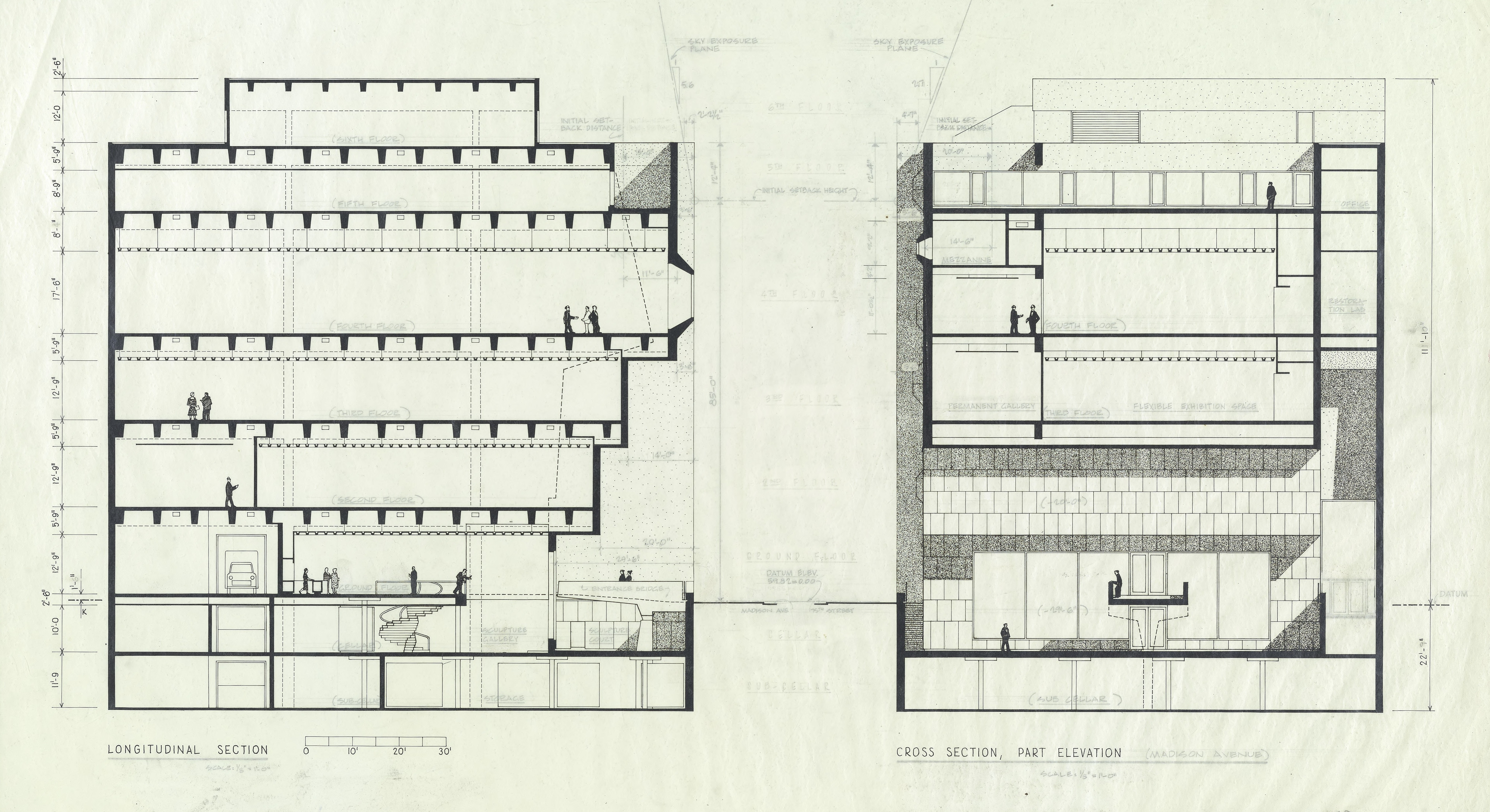
Cross-section showing the interior as originally laid out

The building originally had 76,830 sq ft (7,138 m^{2}) of interior space. As first designed, the building had a lobby, coatroom, small gallery, and loading dock on its first floor. The second, third, and fourth floors were dedicated to gallery space, each progressively larger than the space beneath it. Administrative offices were on the fifth floor, and a large mechanical penthouse acted as the sixth floor. The lower floors were designed for a sculpture gallery and courtyard, a kitchen and dining space, and storage. Only about one-third of the building was used as exhibition space; sources disagree on whether the exhibits covered about 30,000 square feet (2,800 m^{2}) or 33,000 square feet (3,100 m^{2}). The remainder was for offices, storage, meeting rooms, a library, a restoration laboratory, stairs, elevators, and other spaces.

The interior design included relatively few decorations so visitors could focus on artwork rather than on the architecture. The building's design originally included an earth-colored interior, utilizing concrete, bluestone, and oiled bronze. Lighting throughout the building is almost entirely artificial, with a small number of windows angled to prevent direct sunlight from entering. A freight elevator was installed in the 2020s following Sotheby's renovation of the building; before the elevator was installed, museum exhibits were brought through the building's largest passenger elevator.

==== Lobby ====
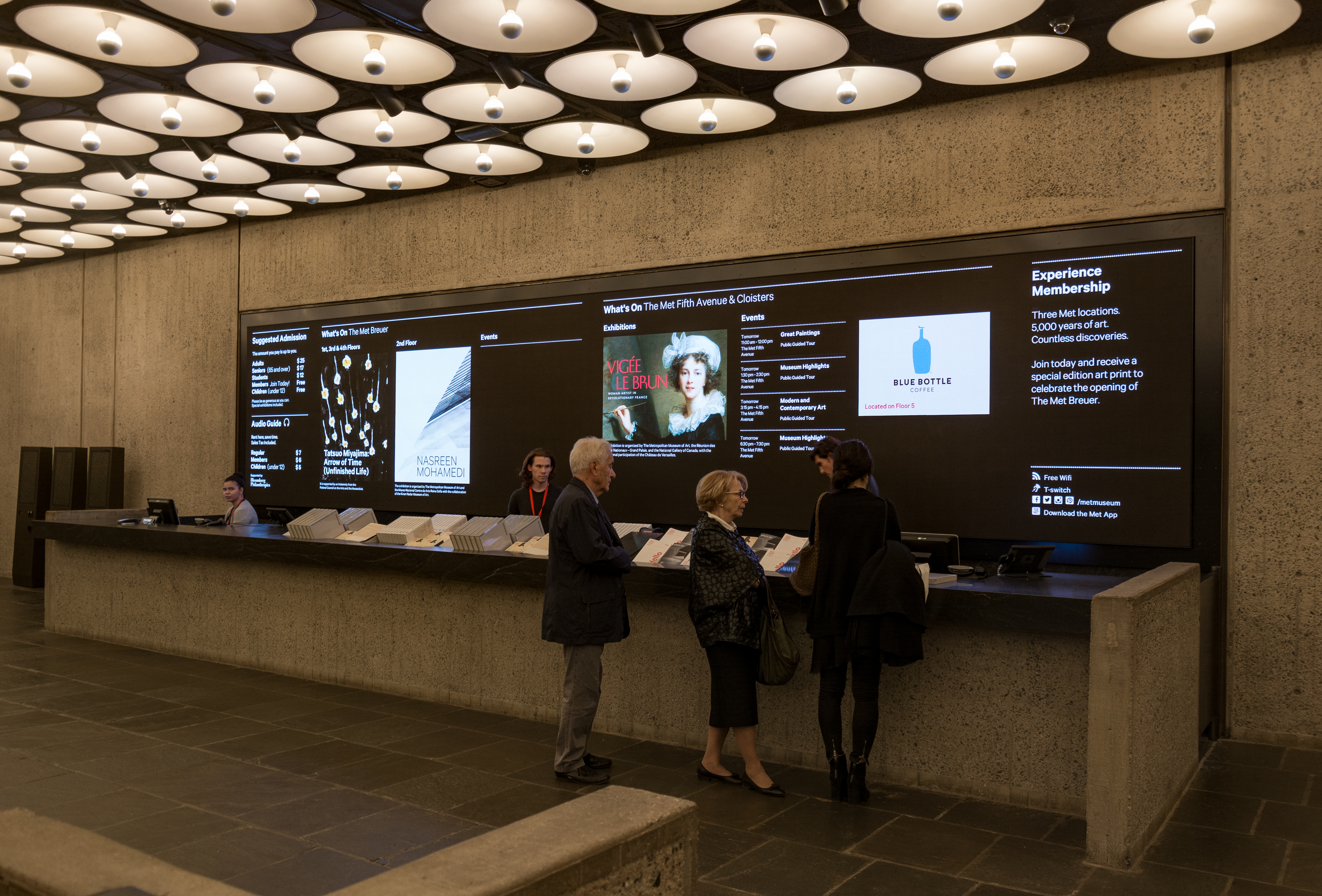
The lobby's front desk and LED media wall

The main entrance on Madison Avenue leads to a concrete board-formed vestibule with two sets of glass doors, which in turn leads to the western wall of the lobby. The rectangular lobby, recessed from the windows, contains an information desk and waiting spaces. There is a staircase to the basement at the southwest corner and a gallery at the southeast corner. Along the north wall is a bench, an inlaid clock, and a coatroom with a concrete counter. The granite-topped information desk is on the eastern wall and is flanked by a passageway to the gallery on the right and a doorway to the loading dock to the left. To the south are two elevators and a service doorway with bronze doors.

The ceiling is taken up by white circular light fixtures, each with a single bare silver-tipped bulb. Until they were replaced with LED lamps in the 2020s, the fixtures gave off light in multiple hues of gray. The interior is rich in materials – granite, wood, bronze, and leather, though muted in color. Concrete walls in the lobby are bush-hammered, and framed by smooth board-formed edges; the Met's contemporary art chair noted this as a delightful attention to detail. The lobby, renovated extensively in preparation for the Met Breuer's opening, had an unoriginal gift shop structure removed, and its walls and sculptural ceiling lights were repaired. After the Met Breuer opened, the lobby featured a 32-foot-long (9.8 m) matte black LED media wall, a television screen, exhibitions, and other information.

When Sotheby's took over, some lobby furniture was converted to display cases and cabinets. Vitrines, or showcases, were also added to the lobby, and a gift shop was constructed behind one row of vitrines. Paintings by Frank Stella and Damien Hirst and a sculpture by Jean Arp were displayed in the lobby, and there were displays of rare manuscripts and jewelry. In addition, there is a screen above the front desk.

==== Dining space ====
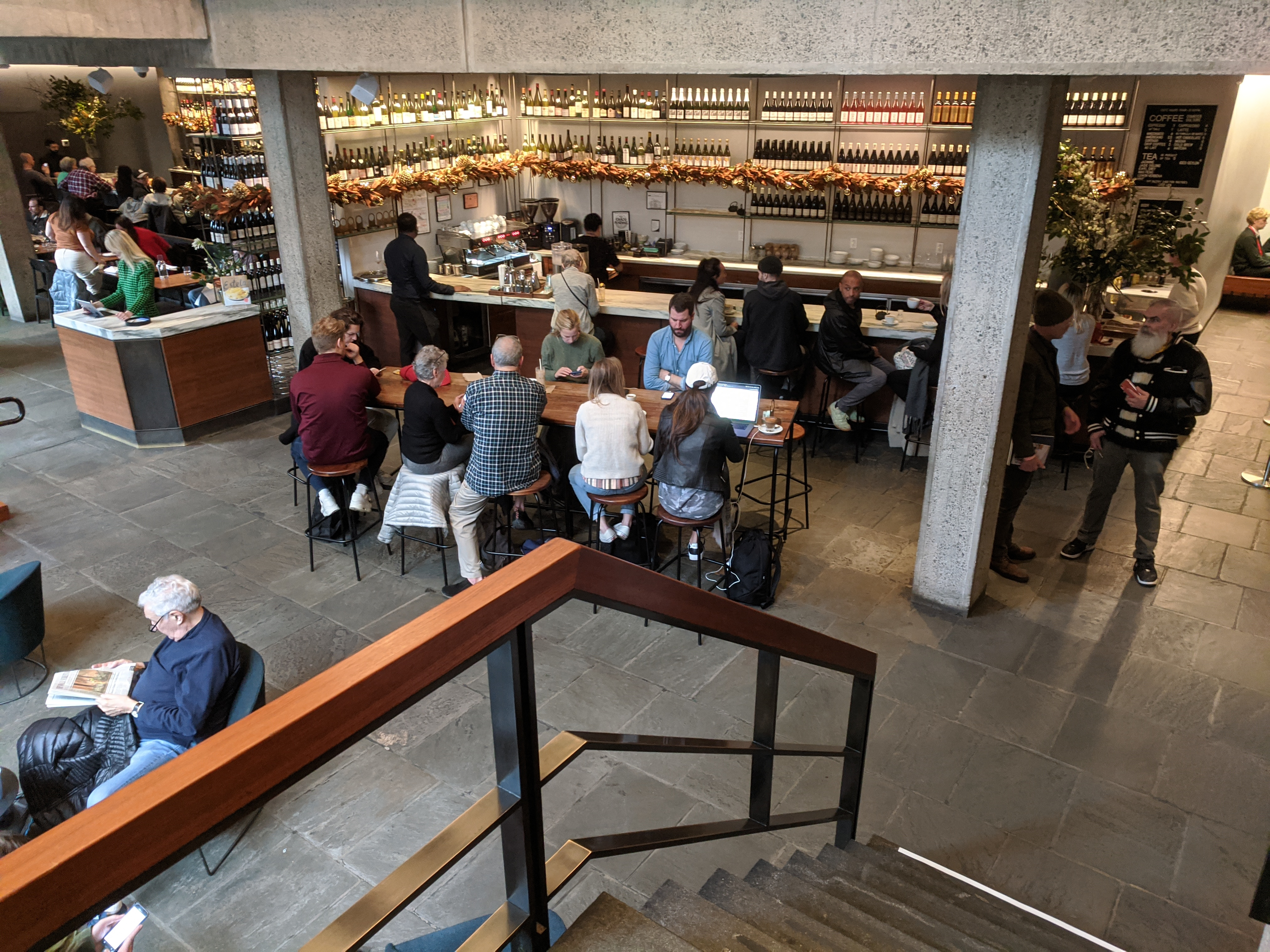
Flora Bar, 2020

The basement is accessed by the stair at the lobby's southwest corner. The western wall of the basement is made of glass and connects with the areaway. The basement has bush-hammered concrete walls, slate floors, and a ceiling with circular lights, much like the rest of the lobby. The Breuer Building's lower-level dining space has hosted numerous tenants. At its opening, the building had a cafeteria-style restaurant. By the 1980s, the space was called the Garden Restaurant, the same name used for the restaurant in the museum's prior space beside the Abby Aldrich Rockefeller Sculpture Garden. The restaurant hired a new manager and offered an English tea service, mushroom omelets, spicy pasta, and a layered "Whitney Cake".

In the 1990s, the Whitney was among numerous Manhattan museums to elevate their restaurants; the Whitney contracted Sarabeth's, a New York City brunch chain of cafés with a nostalgic homeyness, noted as contrasting with the modern stark museum building. The Whitney chose Sarabeth's for its offerings of American food matching the museum's American theme, and for the chain's already substantial following. It opened in mid-July 1991. The space in the museum building had wooden tables and comfortable blond wood armchairs with lively fabric upholstery situated on slate floors with stone-and-granite walls. The 80-seat dining room's west wall was entirely glass, looking out onto the museum's outdoor sculpture garden, where brunch was served on weekends. It was at times adorned with a self-portrait by Alfred Leslie, or with Andy Warhol's Flowers 1970.

For approximately 20 years, Sarabeth's operated the café there, serving breakfast and lunch. Its American-themed menu included cream of tomato soup, Caesar salad, and strawberry shortcake. Sarabeth's was known for its home-style desserts which were compared to works of art; in 2001 owner Sarabeth Levine chose to replicate works shown in a Wayne Thiebaud exhibit for her daily dessert specials. As well, for a time, Thiebaud's painting Pie Counter, depicting rows of American-style pies and cakes, hung at the entrance to the restaurant. Sarabeth's closed in January 2010, replaced by a popup operated by New York restaurateur Danny Meyer. The Whitney chose the new tenant in order to avoid contracting outside caterers, as Sarabeth's did not offer large-scale catering. In 2011, Meyer closed the popup and opened his restaurant Untitled (a business which in 2015 re-opened at the Whitney's new building in the Meatpacking District, and permanently closed in 2021).

Beginning in 2015 when 945 Madison held the Met Breuer, it housed a pop-up Blue Bottle Coffee shop on the fifth floor. It later added the restaurant Flora Bar (known before opening as Estela Breuer) in its lower level and sunken sculpture court. It was operated by restaurateurs Ignacio Mattos and Thomas Carter, and was critically acclaimed (with two stars from The New York Times), though it was hindered by reports of a toxic work environment. The space was renovated at the Met Breuer's opening at an estimated cost of $2 million. The restaurant and museum closed during the COVID-19 pandemic, and it was announced in February 2021 that the restaurant would not reopen when the Frick gallery opened in March. A café with light dishes and snacks, operated by Joe Coffee, operated in the space during the beginning of the Frick's tenancy. In November 2022, the café lease was transferred to the company the SisterYard.

==== Galleries ====
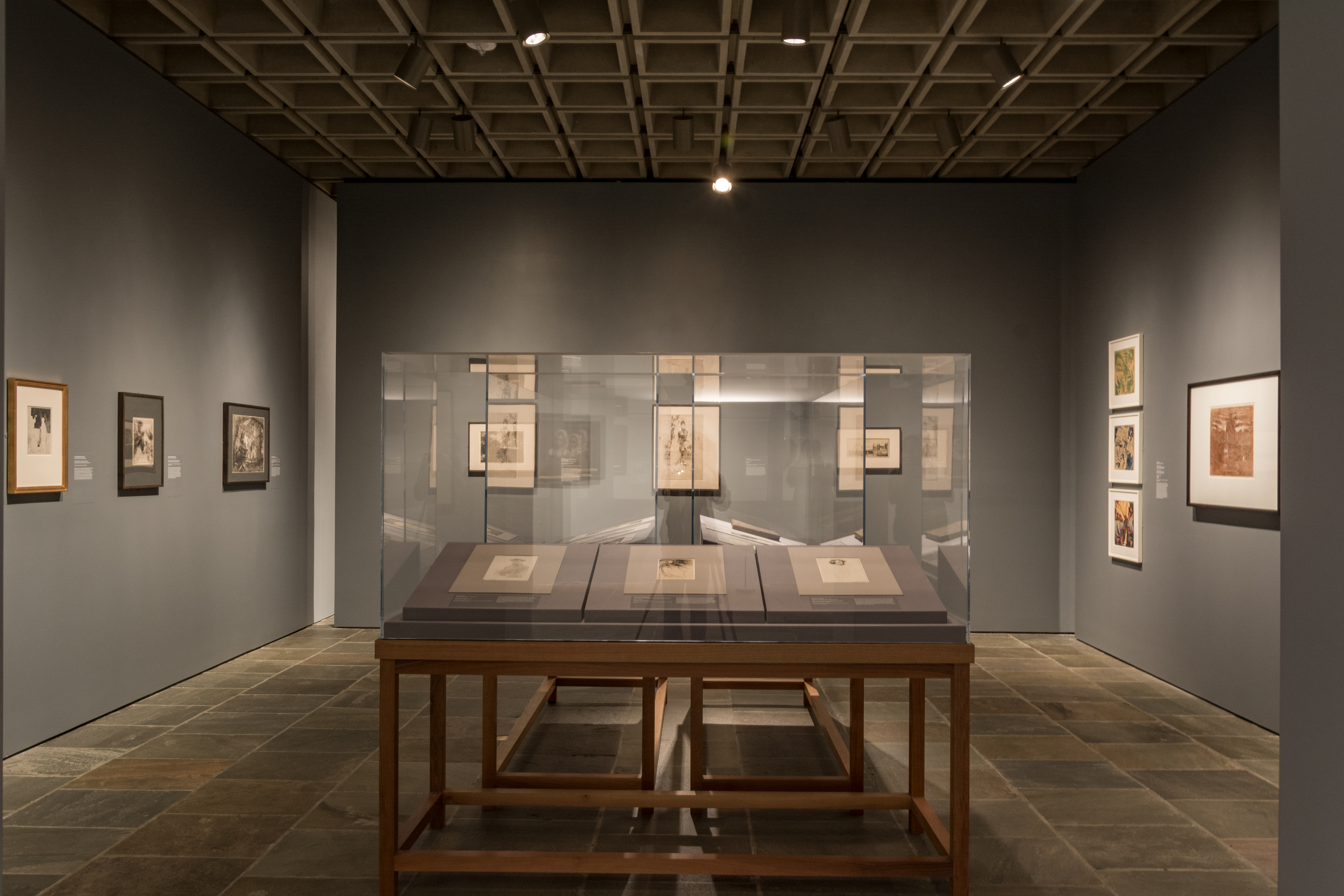
An interior gallery space

While exhibition space was made relatively bare at the museum's opening (with white walls and panels on slate floors), its permanent gallery space made use of carpets, woven wall coverings, and comfortable furniture to make the space more intimate. The gallery floors are of bluestone tile, teakwood, and split pieces of slate. Most galleries have slate floors, except for one of the first floor-galleries, which has teakwood floors for dance receptions. The walls are white, gray, or granite-faced and relatively blank, allowing for "plenty of hanging area for the paintings inside". Ceiling heights vary; the second and third floors are 12 3/4 feet (3.9 m), while the fourth floor is 17 1/2 feet (5.3 m). The ceilings use a suspended grid of concrete coffers with rails for movable partitions. The original spot lighting and indirect lighting fixtures were created by Edison Price and hung from the concrete grids; there are diffusers and mirrors over each fixture. Wires and lightbulb plugs are embedded throughout the ceiling grid, which allowed artificial lighting fixtures to be arranged in a near-infinite number of ways. In the 2020s, Sotheby's added mechanical systems within the ceiling grid.

Originally, the galleries were open plan spaces; the largest individual exhibition space, measuring 100 feet (30 m) long, was on the fourth floor. The spaces could be split up by movable plywood partition walls, which could be arranged in a myriad of layouts on the second through fourth floors. The partitions were placed on a grid of 4-by-4-foot (1.2 by 1.2 m) squares. Each partition panel had holes where artwork could be mounted, and the bottoms of each partition had wheels. During its 2010s lease to the Metropolitan Museum of Art, the interior spaces on the second and third floor were divided into semi-permanent gallery rooms. When Sotheby's took over the building, some of the offices were removed, and displays were placed on the second through fifth floors. One room on the second floor became an 1,832-square-foot (170.2 m^{2}) auction hall, while the third-floor rooms were rearranged around a corridor overlooking a window. A sales room was added on the fourth floor, overlooked by a mezzanine for private viewings. Sotheby's spaces are divided by removable partitions.

==== Main staircase ====
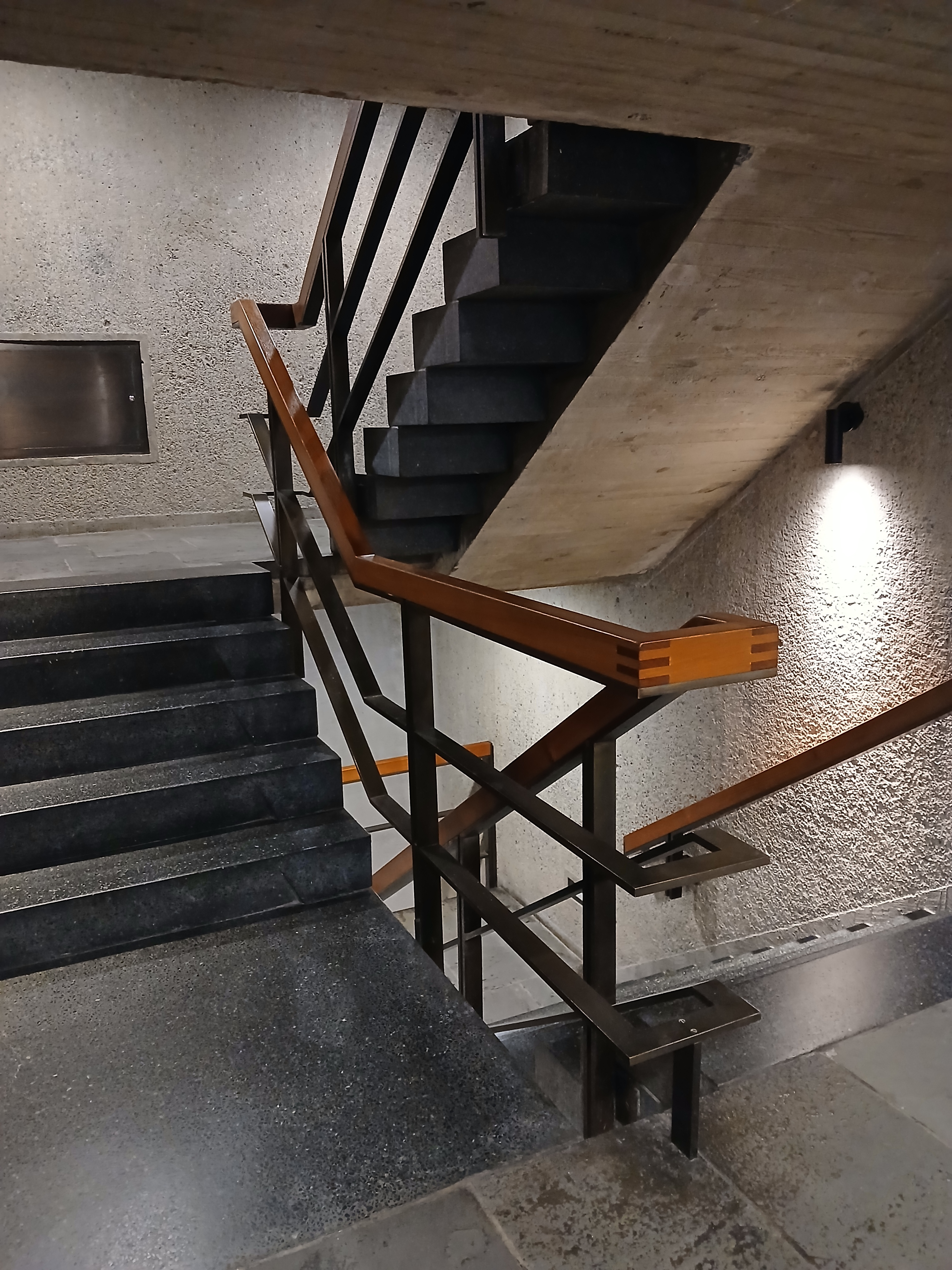
The main staircase

A staircase, at the south end of the building, ascends from the basement to the fifth floor. The staircase's walls are made of bush-hammered concrete with inset lighting, as well as bronze-and-wood railings. The staircase has vertical risers, which have rounded indentations and are made of terrazzo. The horizontal treads are also made of terrazzo with board-formed concrete underneath. Some of the stair landings between each floor have benches, and there are bronze doors leading from the stair to each floor. According to McCarter, the building incorporates "one of the best examples of Breuer's ability to make staircases into functional sculpture", as it changes gradually and subtly in dimensions and proportions between floors, though its materials are consistent throughout. Breuer had originally proposed a spiral staircase in the center, but this had been rejected by the city government.

Dwellings, a miniature work of art by Charles Simonds, is located on the flight from the first to the second story, extending to the rooftop and windowsill of neighboring 940 Madison Avenue. Dwellings, commissioned in 1981, depicts structures on a miniature landscape. The portion inside the Breuer Building was commissioned for the Whitney, and is the most accessible component of the artwork. The piece remained in place after Sotheby's bought the structure in 2023, as part of a long-term agreement Sotheby's signed with the Whitney.

== History ==
=== 1964–2014: Whitney Museum ===
In 1929, philanthropist Gertrude Vanderbilt Whitney founded the Whitney Museum to champion American modern art. Prior to this, she had offered 500 artworks from her collection to the Metropolitan Museum of Art, only to have her proposal declined. Consequently, Whitney resolved to establish her own museum, initially showcasing around 700 works of American art. The museum initially opened in 1931 on West 8th Street, spanning three remodeled rowhouses. However, this location quickly proved inadequate. In 1954, the museum relocated to an annex of the Museum of Modern Art (MoMA) at 22 West 54th Street. The space, a three-story edifice occupying a land lot of 6,800 square feet (630 m^{2}), also failed to meet the museum's rapidly growing needs. By the mid-1960s, the Whitney's associate director John I. H. Baur had likened the 54th Street building to a straitjacket.

==== Development ====
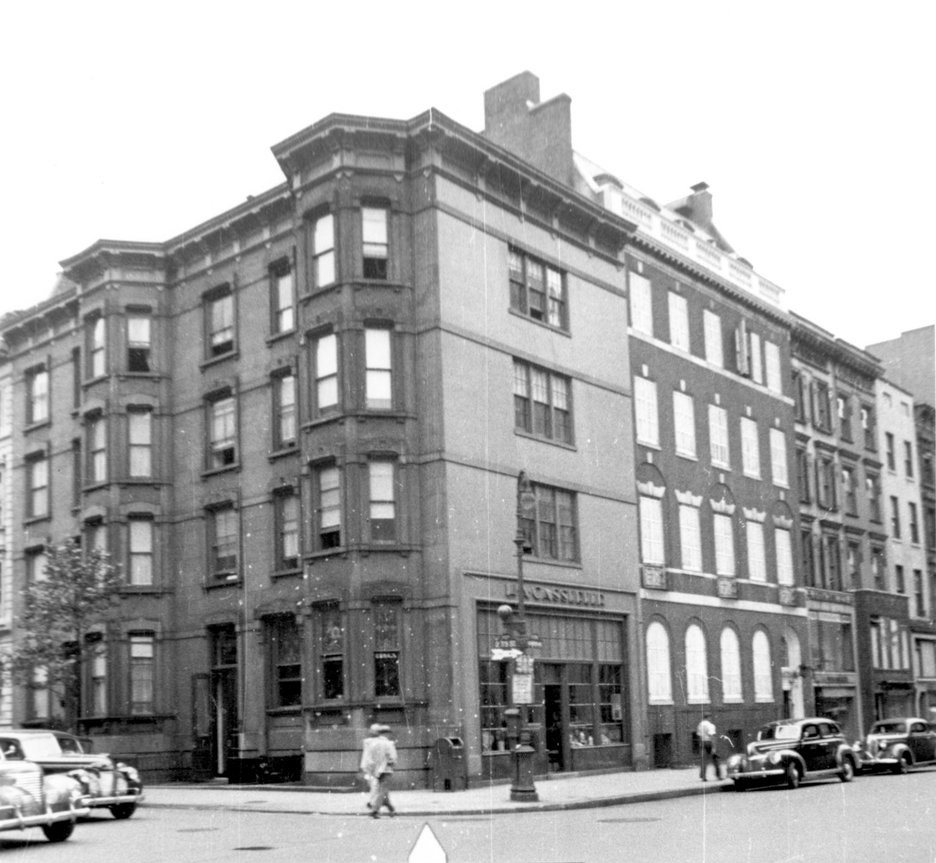
Site at Madison and 75th in the 1940s

The Whitney began looking for sites for a new museum building in 1958, which would be three times as large as the existing facility. During the 1960s, the Whitney Museum expanded its board of trustees beyond the Whitney family and their close advisors, welcoming new members such as Jacqueline Kennedy, then the First Lady of the United States. The new members wanted the Whitney to rival other major museums in the city; the Guggenheim had constructed a new museum in 1959 and MoMA expanded in 1951 and 1964. In the early 1960s, Marcel Breuer and Louis Kahn presented ideas for a new museum building; the two had "captured the committee's imagination" best and thus had been narrowed down from a list of five "radical" architects, none of whom had designed major public buildings in New York City. In 1961, the board selected Breuer, who promised to create a "building designed as sculpture". The new building was to be assertive and experimental, in contrast to the inconspicuous site the Whitney occupied in the shadow of the MoMA. The facility would triple the Whitney's space, giving it more room for exhibition halls, an auditorium, a library. and a restaurant. Breuer's building would also allow the Whitney to resume acquisitions of pre-1900 art, which the museum had not owned since 1949.

In early 1963, the Whitney identified a site at Madison Avenue and 75th Street on the Upper East Side for the new museum building, measuring 103 by 125 feet (31 by 38 m) across. The site was formerly occupied by six 1880s rowhouses, owned by developer and art collector Ian Woodner, who demolished them before the museum purchased the property. He had considered constructing a 16-story apartment building with stores, filing plans with the city in 1960, but the project did not make it to fruition, prompting the land's sale to the Whitney. The Whitney selected the location as it was relatively equidistant from the Guggenheim Museum, the Met Fifth Avenue, MoMA, and the Jewish Museum, in a neighborhood increasingly populated with private art galleries. The decision to acquire the lot was publicly announced in June 1963, while Breuer's plans were publicly announced that December. In a presentation about the planned building that year, Breuer stated that the design "should transform the vitality of the street into the sincerity and profundity of art", and that the building should be designed as a distinct unit while also relating to the streetscape around it.

The building was designed in 1963, and the Whitney began raising $8 million next year. The HRH Construction Corp. was awarded the building contract in September 1964, and the museum's cornerstone was laid in a ceremony marking the beginning of construction on October 20, 1964. The cornerstone held a time capsule containing the history of the museum. Kennedy inspected the site in October 1965, at which point the building was half finished, and workers were installing the concrete on the facade. The museum had hoped to finish Breuer's Madison Avenue building by April 1966, and workers began moving 2,600 objects to the new building that June. A bronze eagle on the facade of the 54th Street building, deemed incompatible with the Breuer Building's design, was sold to the U.S. federal government and moved to Washington, D.C. The building, which had an estimated cost of $3–4 million in 1964, ended up costing $6 million.

1964 illustrations

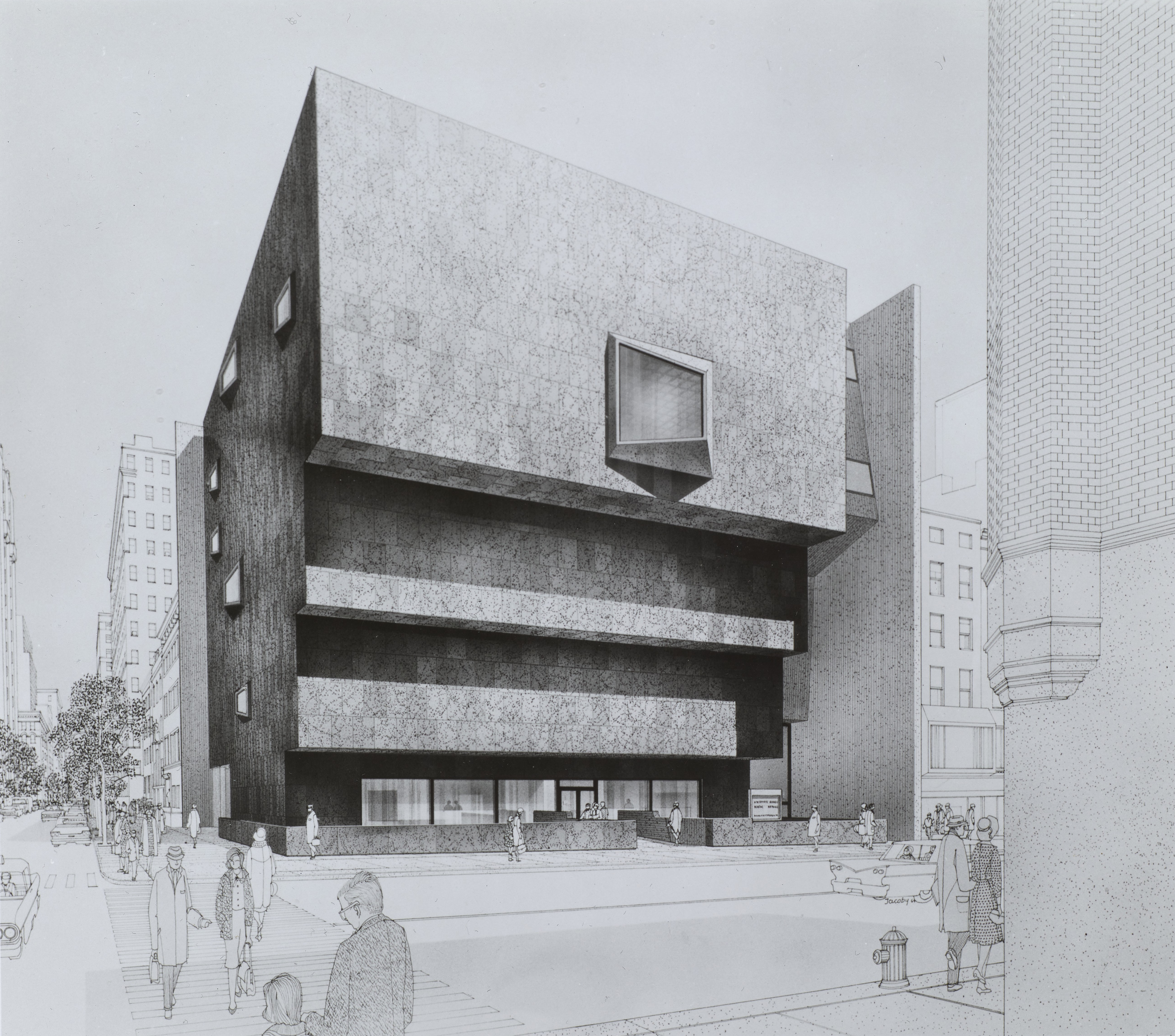
Front elevation

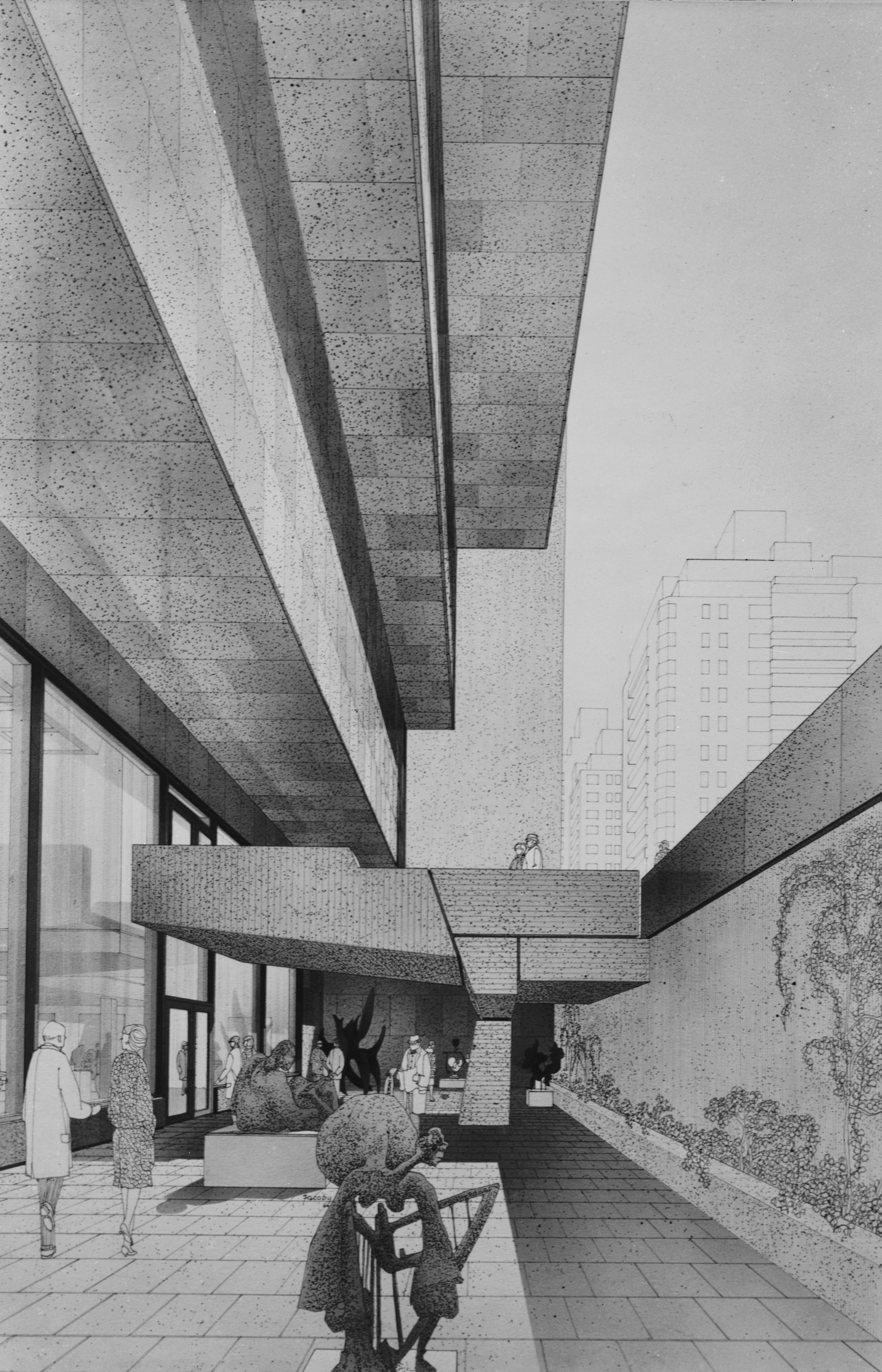
Sculpture garden and entrance bridge

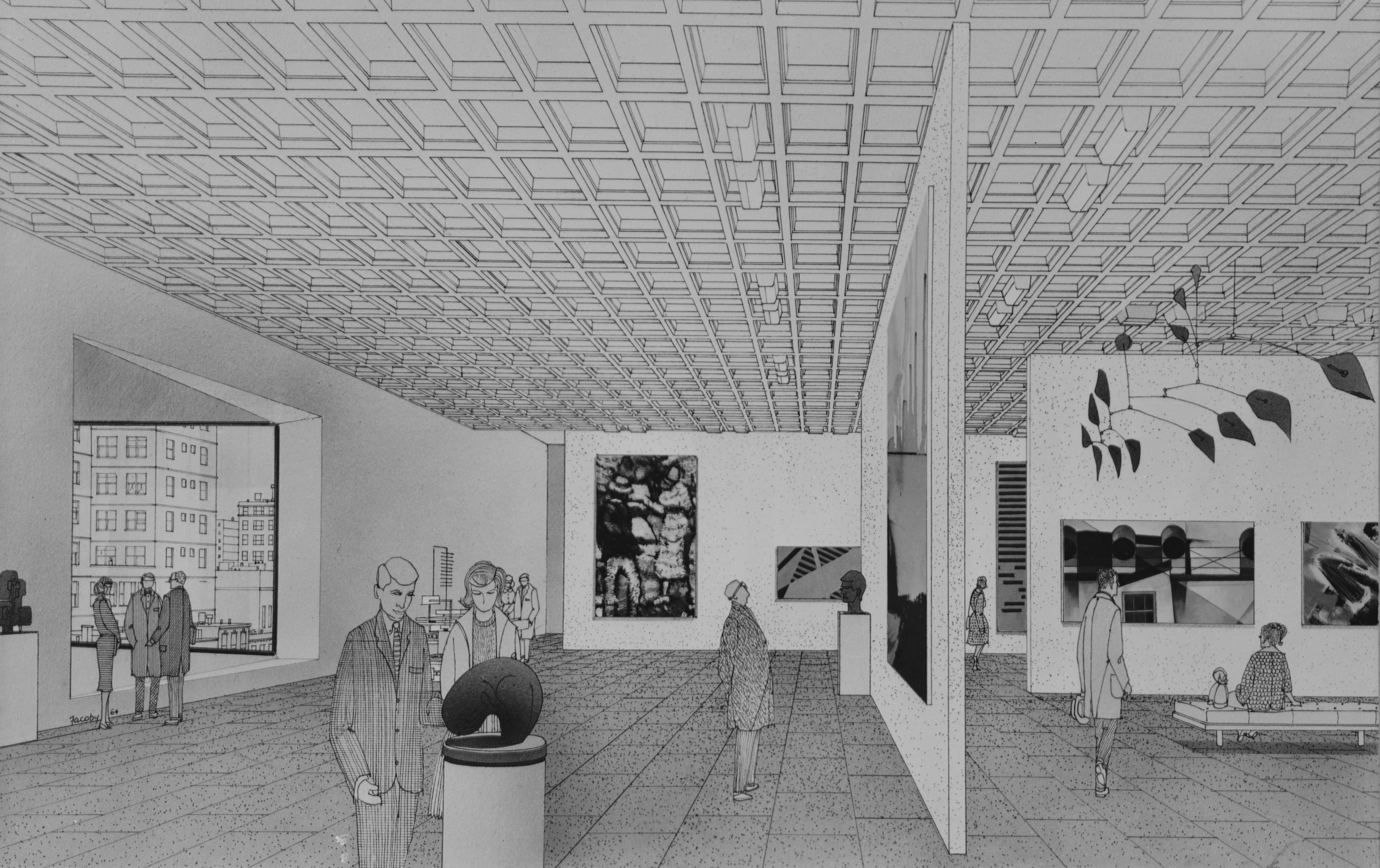
Gallery view highlighting movable partitions, the ceiling grid, and window alcove

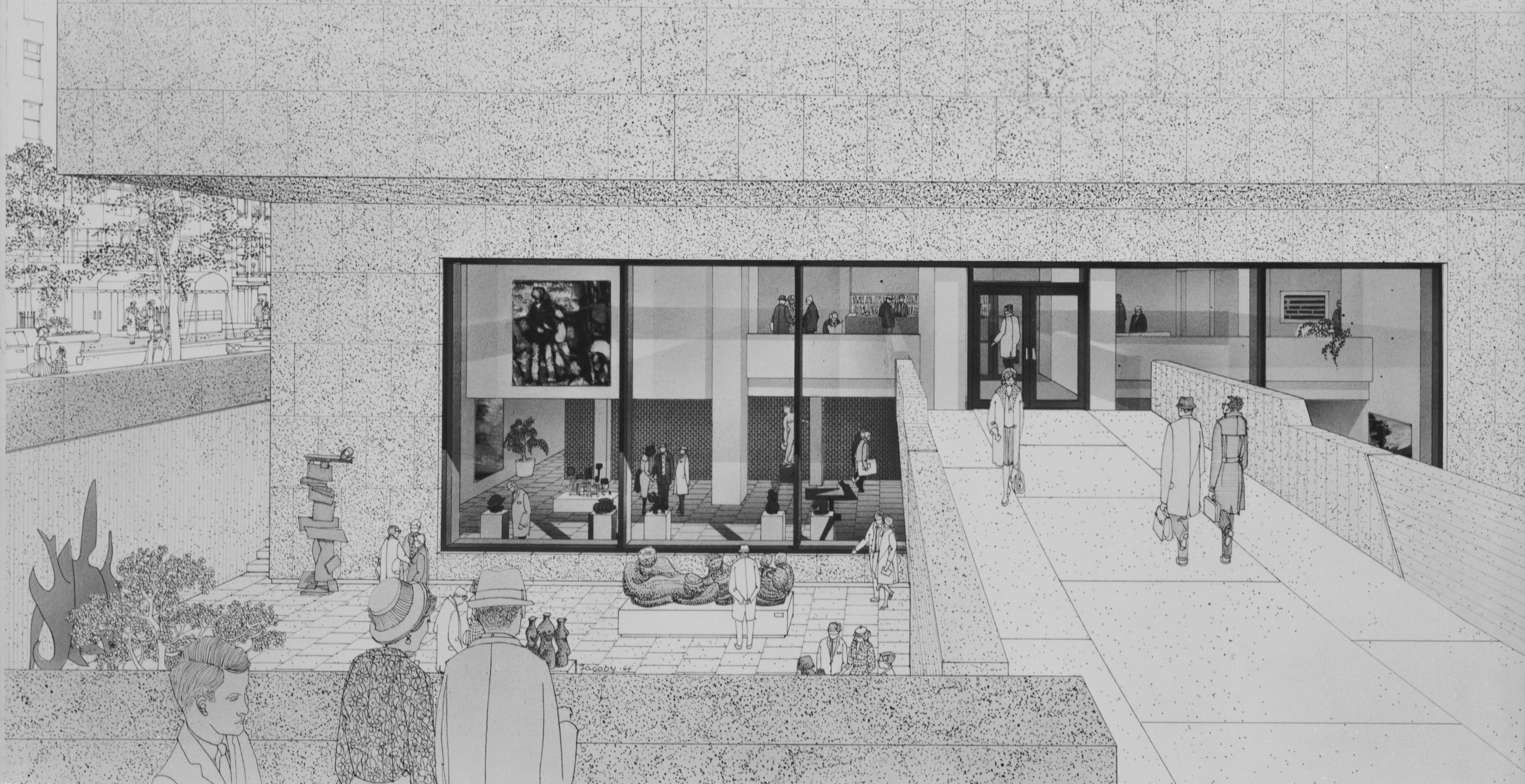
Museum entrance and two-story glass wall

==== Early years ====
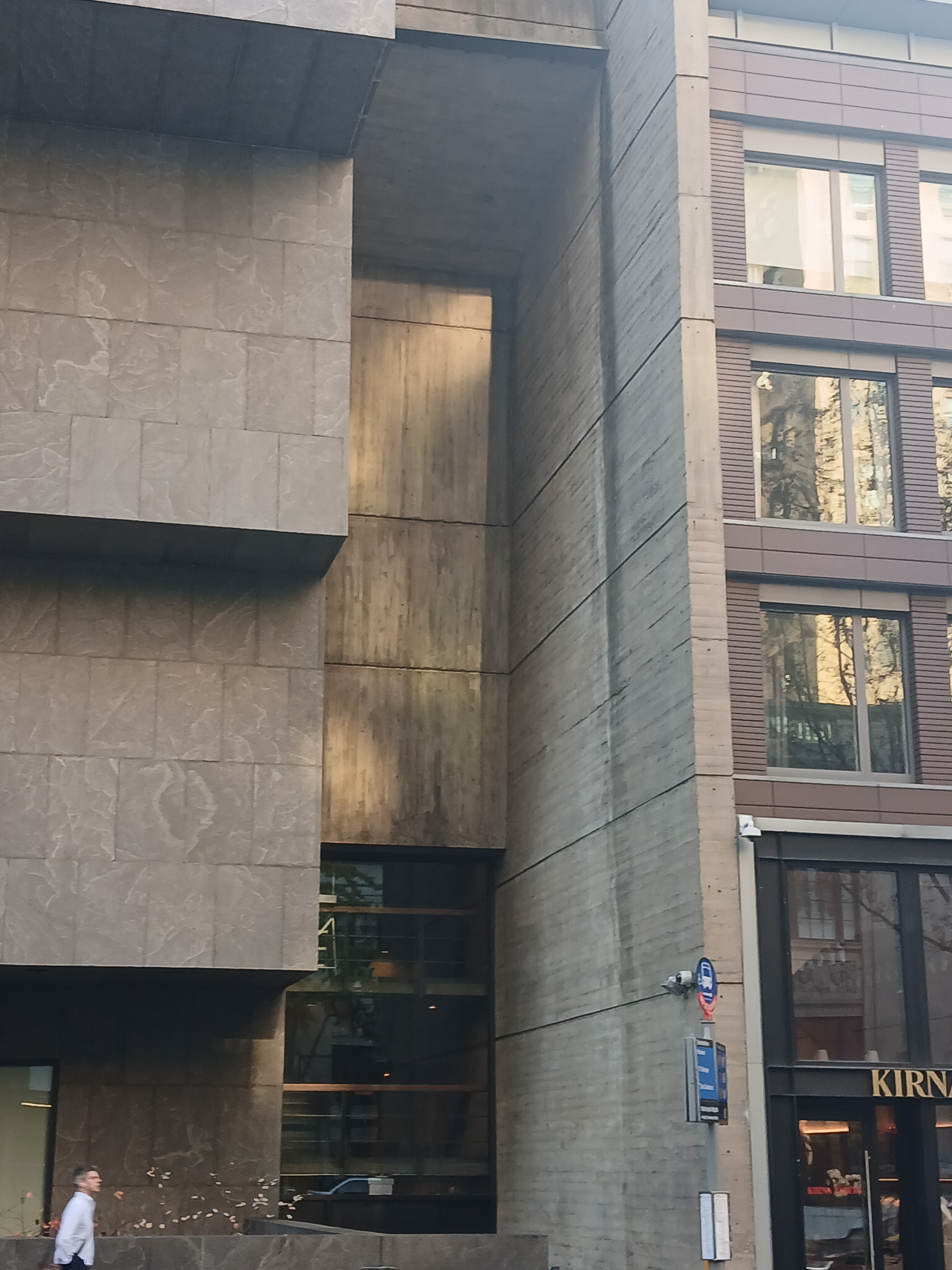
The service door at the southern end of the Madison Avenue elevation

The Whitney's new Breuer Building at 945 Madison Avenue soft opened on September 7, 1966. It officially opened three weeks later on September 27. A member preview event that night was attended by Kennedy, the Whitney family, the architects, and museum board members and staff; the preview was marked by a bomb threat, though no explosives were found. Breuer's building was the museum's third home and is sometimes considered its first permanent location. With its relocation to the Breuer Building, the Whitney extended its hours of operation and started charging admission for the first time. In 1969, a storage cellar below the areaway was shored up to protect the artwork that was being stored there.

The inaugural Whitney Biennial exhibition took place in 1973 at the Breuer Building, featuring works by 221 artists. The 1993 edition of the show also took place in the same building. Curated by Elisabeth Sussman, this event showcased art that addressed race, gender, sexuality, AIDS, and socioeconomic issues. Reviews were initially antagonistic, though it eventually became recognized as among the most notable and influential exhibitions in the museum's history.

==== Late 1970s to late 1990s ====
The institution grappled with space constraints for decades, prompting several satellite museums and exhibition spaces in the 1970s and 1980s. The Whitney considered a significant number of expansion proposals for the Breuer Building, an unusual proportion versus what was actually built. Five different architects (including three Pritzker Prize winners) provided a total of eight proposals, of which only one modest design was actually built. The expansions were prompted by growing crowds in recent years. The building was believed to function well with 1,000 visitors per day, though would reach three to five thousand on busier days. The Whitney thus acquired five brownstone buildings to the south, extending to 74th Street, and had Breuer design knockout panels in the outer walls at each floor, with plans for eventual expansion.

Early expansion proposals

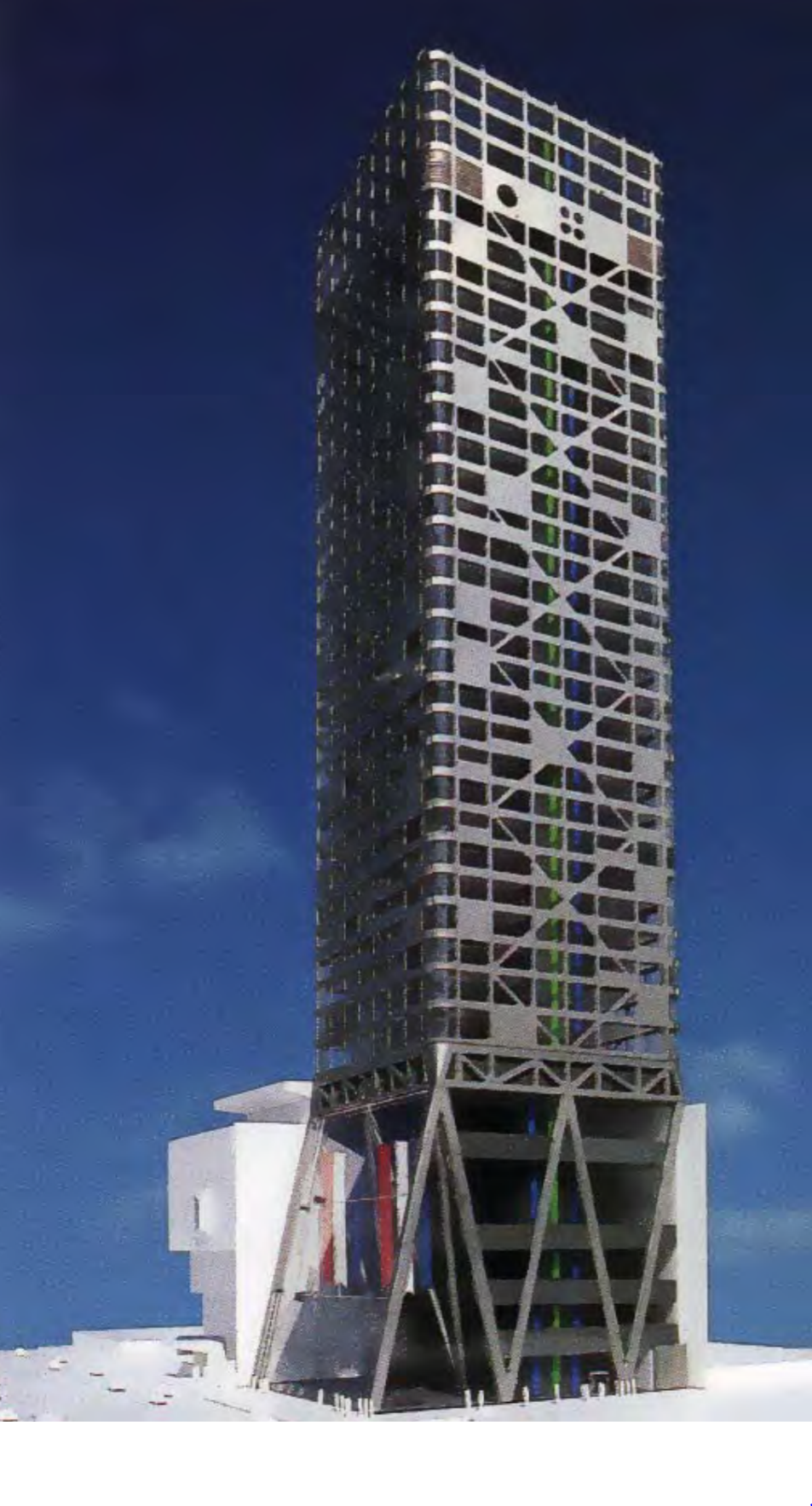
Foster and Walker (1978)

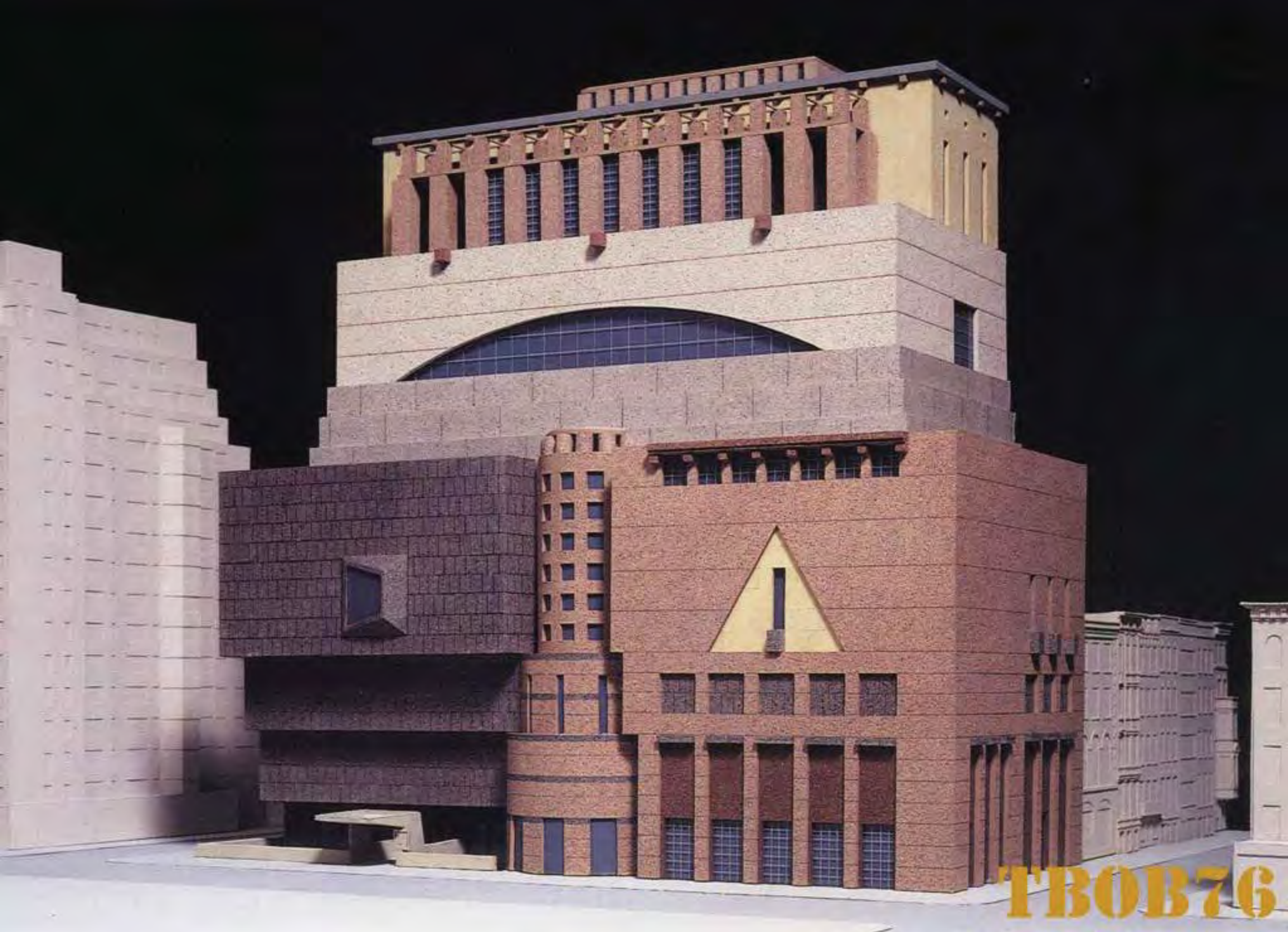
Michael Graves (1985)

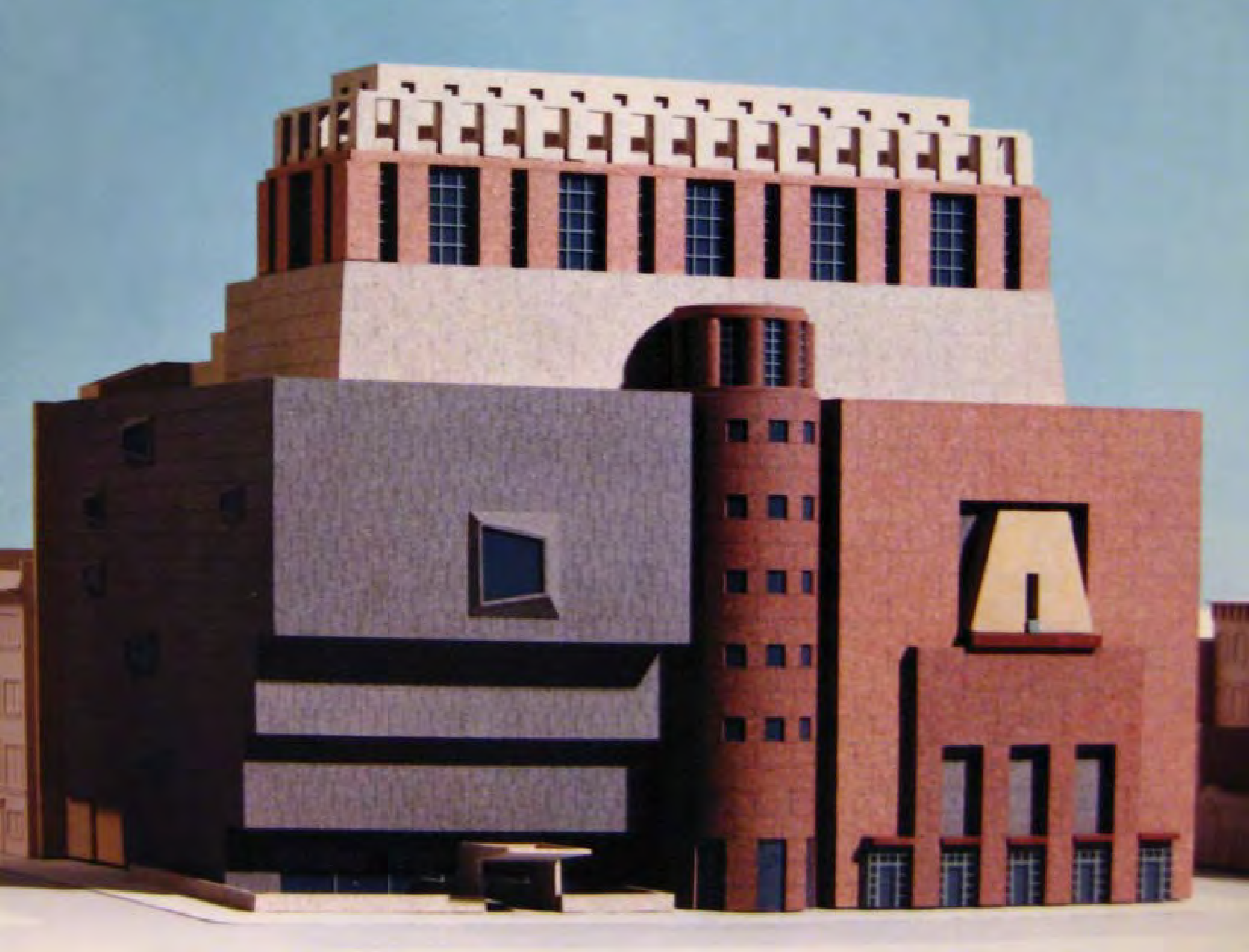
Michael Graves (1987)

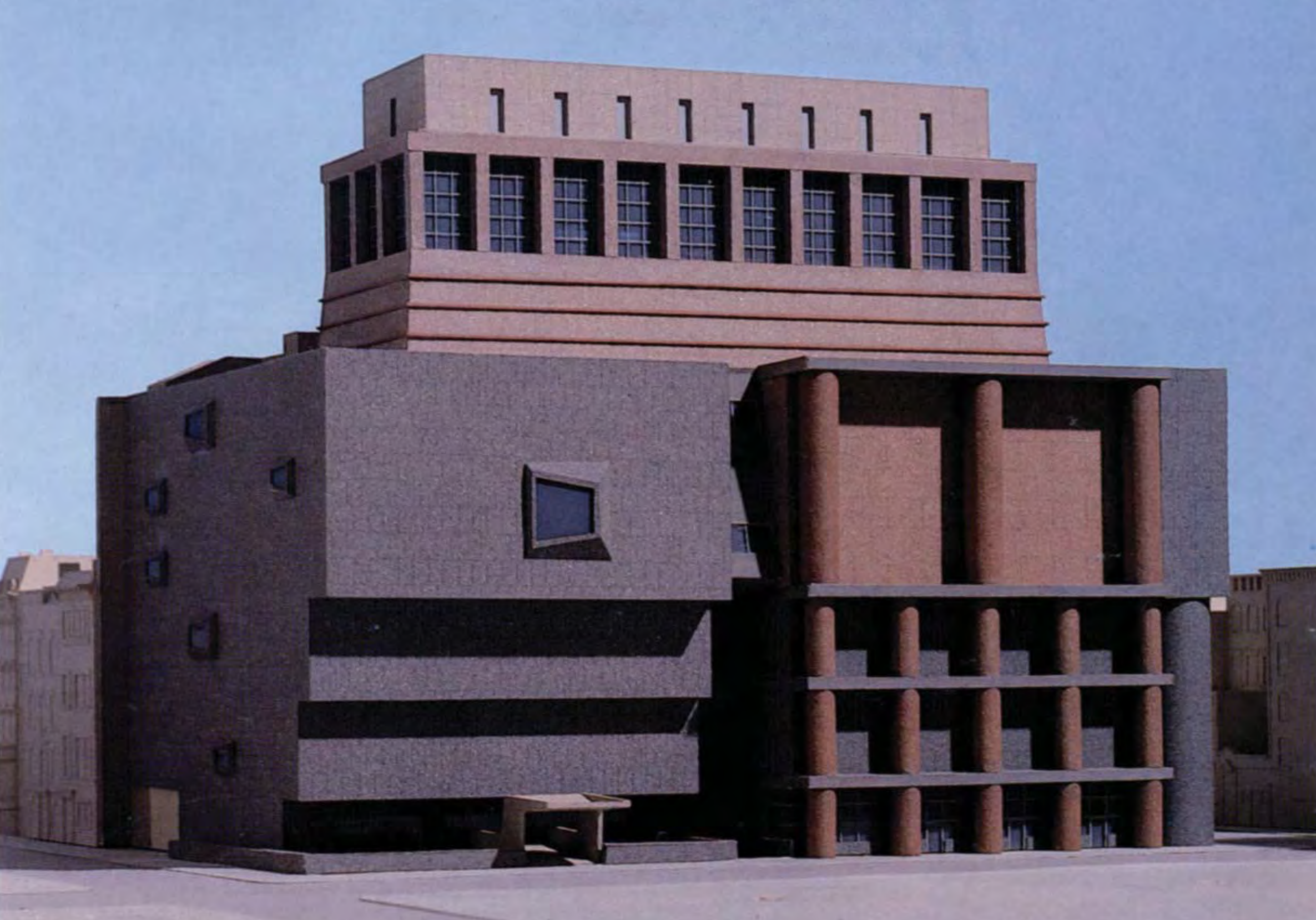
Michael Graves (1988)

In 1978, the Whitney's trustees considered a 35-story tower expansion to the building's south, amid plans for MoMA's museum-condominium "Museum Tower". The plan would let Italian developers create a luxury mixed-use tower with Whitney galleries on its lower floors. The proposed high-tech design was created by the British Norman Foster Associates and Derek Walker Associates. The project was cancelled when it was pointed out that height restrictions would make the mixed-use development unprofitable. The next expansion proposal was by Michael Graves, first announced in 1981, three months after Breuer's death. The first proposal came in May 1985, revised in 1987 and 1988. Graves's postmodern additions, contrasting sharply with the Breuer design, were heavily condemned for their bulk and for not harmonizing with the existing building.

The first polarizing proposal was met with a petition against the design, signed by I.M. Pei, Isamu Noguchi, and about 600 other art and architecture professionals. Breuer's wife Constance and his architect partner Hamilton Smith also weighed in against the design, preferring Breuer's work be torn down. Certain critics prompted the Whitney's board to request the 1987 revision, and his final revision was also disliked. His main advocate, director Thomas Armstrong III, resigned in 1990 before the third revision's approval process had begun.

The board of the Whitney still desired an expansion, though now aimed for a near-imperceptible change. The museum purchased surrounding townhouses (five on Madison, two on 74th, and a two-story building between the two sets). The museum board hired Gluckman Mayner Architects to perform a $135 million two-phase renovation, spanning from 1995 to 1998. The expansion involved renovating three townhouses to create office space, connecting them to the museum via Breuer's knockout panels. A new two-story library was built within a rear yard space. The Breuer Building's fifth floor terraces were enclosed, and the floor was converted into gallery space. The building was also extensively cleaned and given new HVAC systems. The work was made to look invisible – the new galleries appeared original, and the new administrative spaces preserved the historic brownstones' exteriors and much of the interiors. The new fifth floor gallery was funded by then-chairman Leonard Lauder, and was named for him and his wife.

==== 2000s and 2010s ====
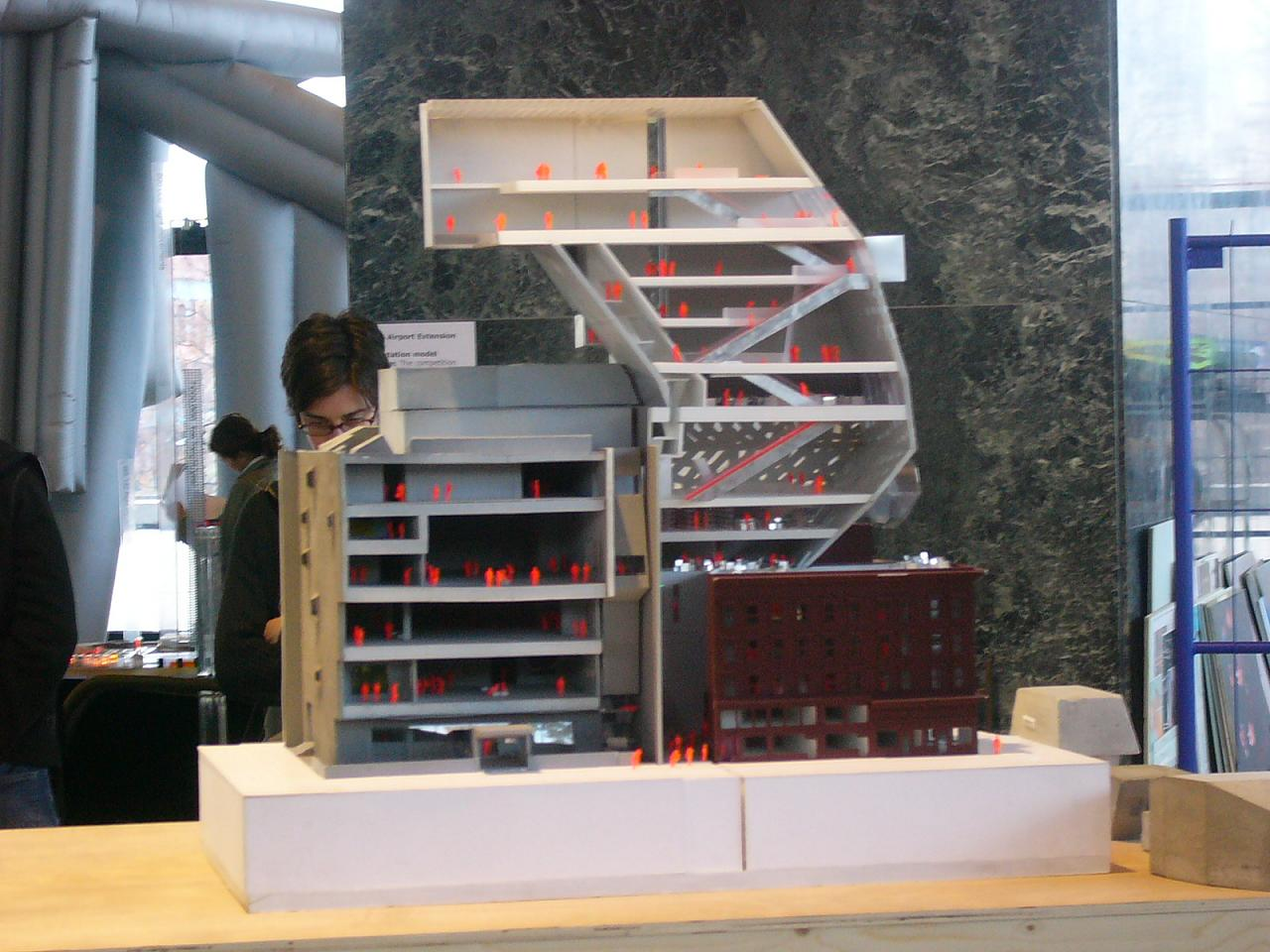
Model of OMA's expansion proposal, 2003

In 2001, the Whitney held a closed competition to further increase space; this time with a more visible addition to the building. Gluckman Mayner submitted a new proposal, along with the firms of Peter Eisenman, Steven Holl, Machado & Silvetti, Jean Nouvel, Norman Foster, and Rem Koolhaas. The Whitney selected Koolhaas and his firm OMA. The proposed building would be enormous, cantilevering above and over the Breuer Building. The museum kept the proposal relatively confidential and ultimately abandoned it in 2003, prior to any review processes, citing economic concerns and poor timing (the economics and public willpower of New York City and the country had changed dramatically following the September 11 attacks late in 2001). The project's abandonment was once of the major issues prompting the Whitney's director Maxwell L. Anderson to resign, which was compared to Armstrong III's resignation in 1990.

Around 2005, amid further planned expansions, the Whitney had the neighboring 943 Madison Avenue demolished and rebuilt, and 941 Madison's depth reduced from 31 to 17 feet (9.4 to 5.2 m). The work was controversial, seen by some preservationists as too severe, and by some in the architecture field as not bold enough. The Whitney hired Italian architect Renzo Piano to design an addition in 2004; Piano proposed a nine-story tower inset into the block, connected to the Breuer Building with glass bridges. His proposal would leave the Breuer Building and surrounding brownstones mostly untouched. Preservationists worked to save two brownstones that would be demolished; that paired with skyrocketing construction costs largely doomed the project. The Whitney abandoned Piano's proposal in 2005, deciding instead for him to design a new building for the museum in Lower Manhattan.

The Whitney operated at the Breuer Building until 2014, and it moved to the Renzo Piano-designed building in the Meatpacking District the following year. The Whitney's final exhibit in the Breuer Building was a Jeff Koons retrospective, which ended October 19, 2014. It was the largest survey the Whitney made dedicated to a single artist, and was among the Whitney's highest-attended events. The Whitney's donor plaques remain in place, as does Dwellings.

=== 2015–2020: Met Breuer ===
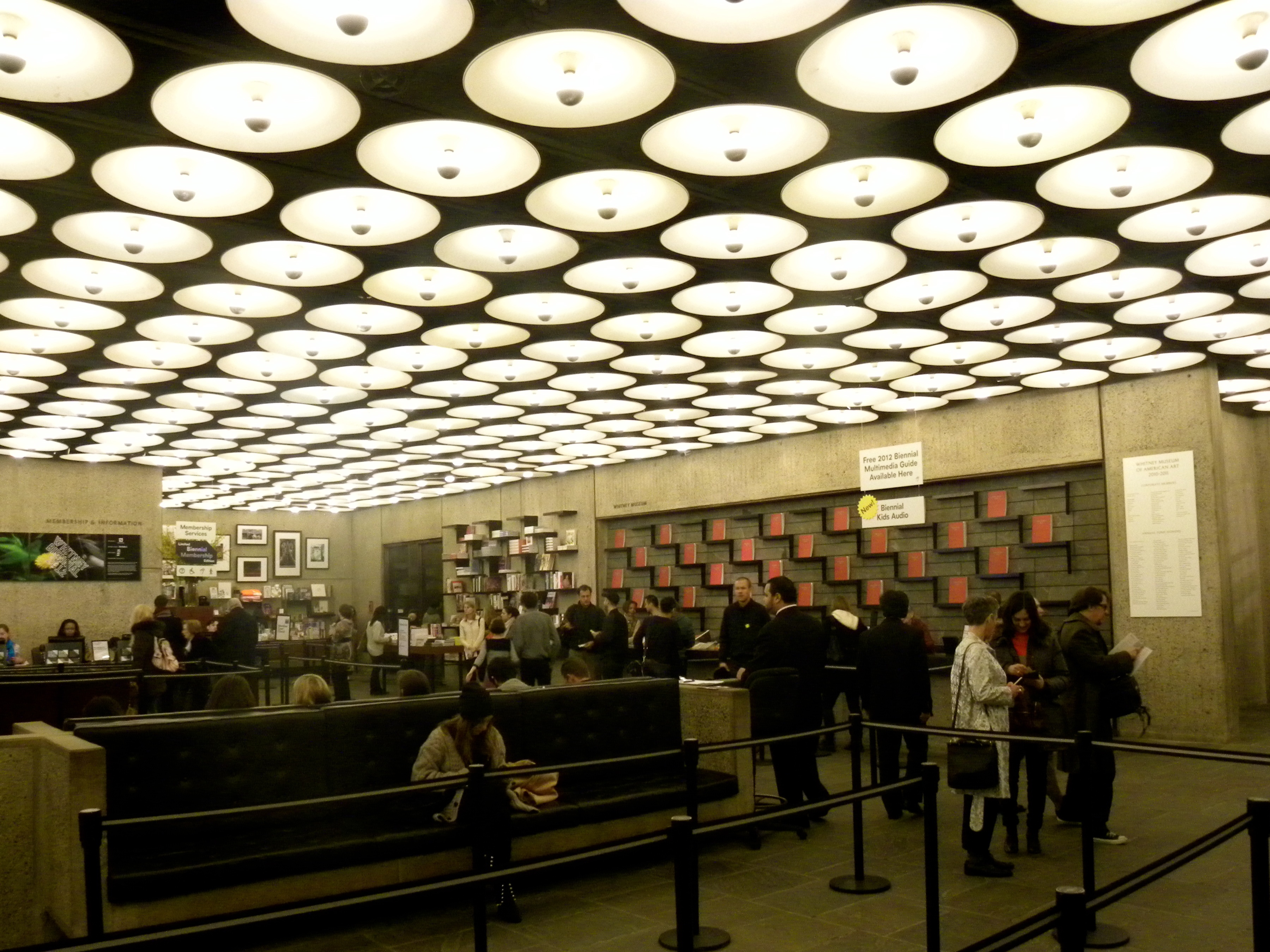
The museum's lobby in 2011

The Metropolitan Museum of Art, looking to build its presence in the modern and contemporary art scenes, agreed to lease the building in 2011, to enter into effect around 2015. The museum was also looking to display its contemporary and modern art while its Fifth Avenue building's wing was renovated, making the move potentially temporary from the beginning. The building underwent a $12.95 million renovation ahead of the Met opening. This included a thorough cleaning, led by Beyer Blinder Belle. The architects also stripped decades of additions, decluttering the lobby of posters, postcard racks, and wires. Floors were re-waxed, and the lobby's lights were replaced with custom LED bulbs. The restoration was careful to preserve elements of natural aging; Breuer chose materials like wood and bronze that would change positively over time.

The Metropolitan Museum of Art opened the Met Breuer at 945 Madison Avenue in 2016, naming the branch after its architect. The museum housed its contemporary art in the building for the next four years. In a surprise announcement in September 2018, the Met announced its plan to close the Met Breuer and hand over the building to the Frick Collection. The Met's director stated that the museum's future was in its main building, and simultaneously announced it will renovate its modern and contemporary galleries at a proposed cost of $500 million ($100 million less than was announced for the project in 2014). The decision would offload three years of rent from its eight-year lease, remove $18 million in annual operation costs, and allow the Frick to open in 2020 in the building with a $45 million sublease (an undisclosed portion of the Met's lease from the Whitney Museum). Robin Pogrebin, writing for The New York Times, stated that critics of the Met Breuer would undoubtedly view the news of the Met Breuer closing as confirmation that the branch was a bad idea.

The museum was originally set to close in July 2020, after its last exhibition, though it closed temporarily during the COVID-19 pandemic in March of that year. That June, the Met decided to close its space there permanently, despite the short-lived exhibition. The closure was a priority of incoming Met director Max Hollein, as it had an expensive lease, low attendance, and mixed reviews.

=== 2021–2024: Frick Madison ===
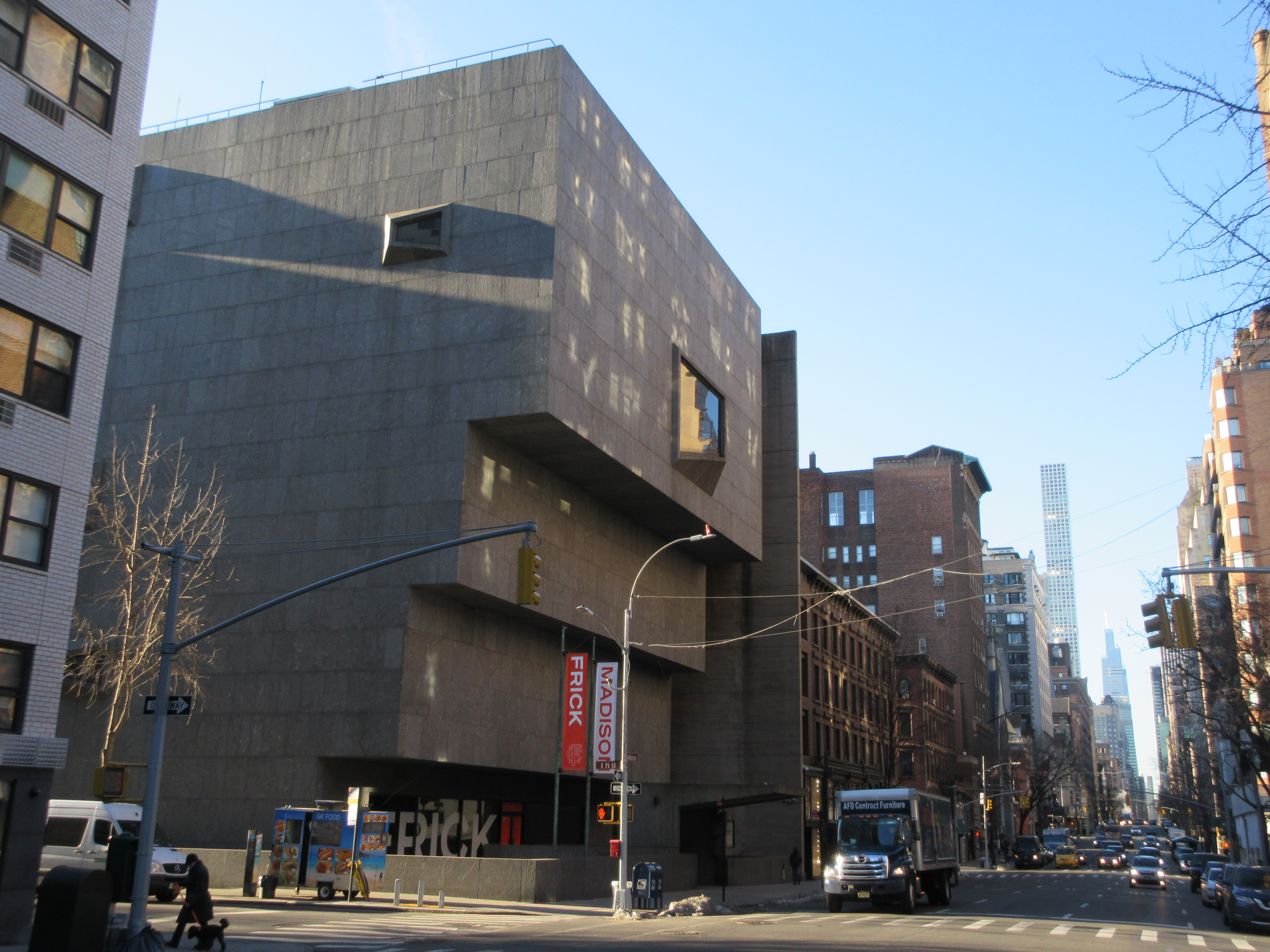
Branded as the Frick Madison, February 2021

The museum building reopened in March 2021 as the Frick Madison, a temporary gallery of the Frick Collection. Since 1935, the Frick had been situated at Henry Clay Frick House, five blocks south of the Breuer Building. However, due to a planned renovation, the museum was set to temporarily operate at 945 Madison for approximately two years. The Frick Collection was looking to open a temporary exhibit during its planned 2020s renovations and had sought the Guggenheim, which was only available for four months. The Metropolitan Museum of Art lent the Breuer Building instead; the Met had leased the building from the Whitney in a deal set to expire in 2023.

The move was seen as remarkable, given that Henry Clay Frick's will stipulated that his purchases (about two-thirds of the museum's holdings) cannot be lent to any other institutions. The Frick Madison housed the Frick's old masters collection, including 104 paintings, along with sculptures, vases, and clocks. Dutch and Flemish paintings occupied the second floor, while Italian and Spanish works took up the third, along with Mughal carpets and Chinese porcelain. The fourth floor featured British and French works. The temporary museum was the second reported occurrence of non-Modern works exhibited in the Modernist Breuer building, after the Met Breuer's inaugural exhibit. The Breuer Building location allowed the Frick Collection to maintain visitorship, membership, and its public attention, rather than if it shuttered for two or more years. Most of the 1,500-piece collection of artwork was placed in storage in the Breuer Building, and about 300 were on display on the second through fourth floors. The building itself was nicknamed "the Frickney".

The artwork was exhibited against stark dark gray walls, with most walls only holding one to two paintings; this contrasted with the ornate setting the paintings had inside the Frick House. There was no protective glass, nor any plaques or signs (a standard the Frick Collection held at its longtime home), save for the artist's name on some frames. Visitors were encouraged to use the museum's app to learn about the artworks in lieu of visible signage. There were no barriers and few display cases, allowing guests to see works unimpaired. Taller works were set low to the ground, giving an illusion of entering the scenes depicted. In April 2023, the Frick announced the Frick Madison would close the next year in preparation for the reopening of the Frick Mansion; the Frick Madison closed on March 3, 2024.

=== 2024–present: Sotheby's ===
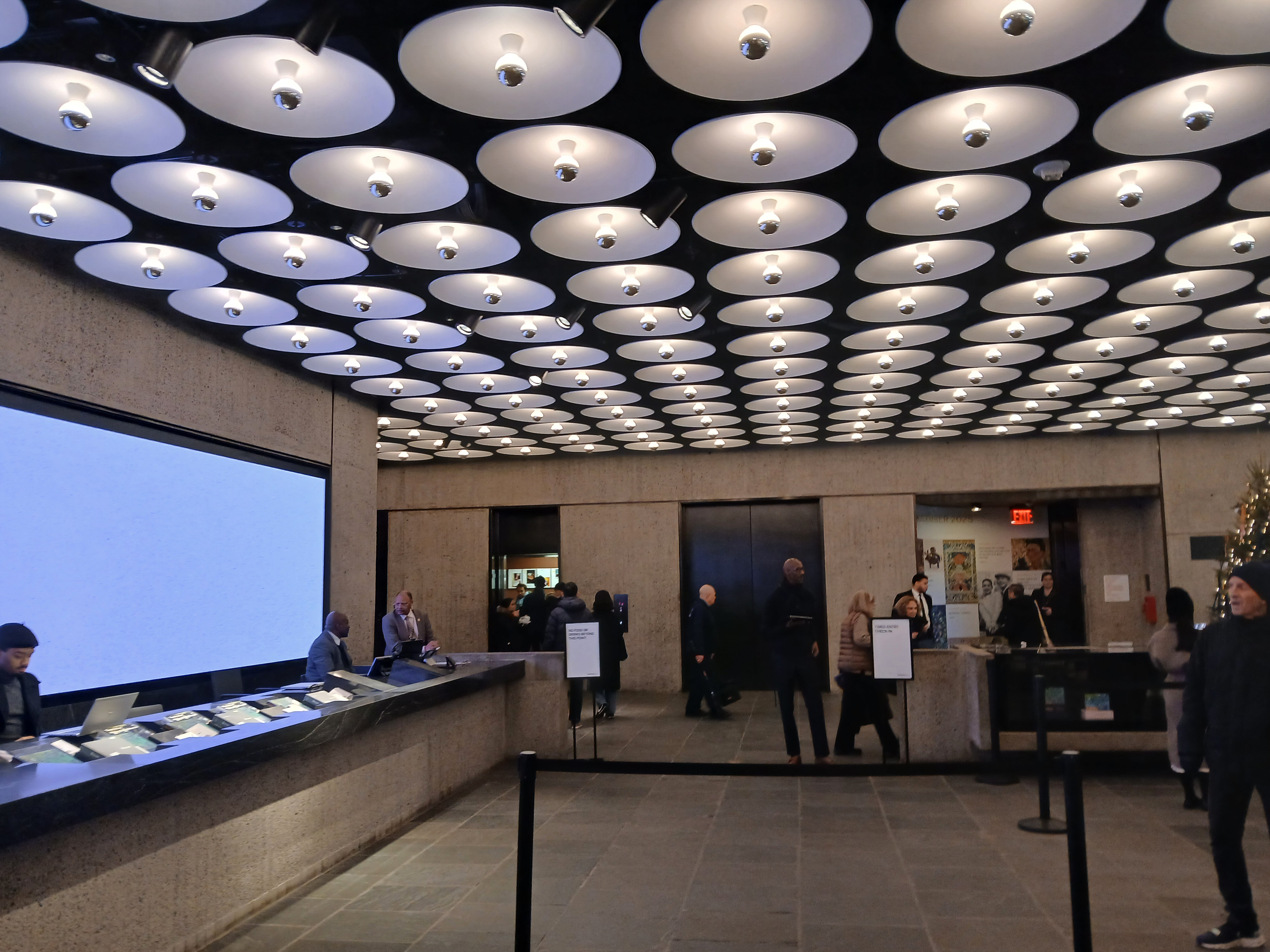
The main lobby after conversion into Sotheby's building

During much of the Frick Madison's lease, the building's future after 2023 was uncertain. There were no announced tenants beyond the Frick Collection, and the Whitney Museum reportedly could not sell the building for the foreseeable future. The 20-year restriction was set in 2008 as part of a $131 million gift from Leonard Lauder, former board chairman emeritus, the largest donation in the museum's history. The museum was reported to be considering a sale by late 2021. Lauder was initially opposed to the Whitney's move downtown, though he eventually grew to like the new museum building, which had been named for him in 2016. The auction house Sotheby's agreed in June 2023 to purchase the building for approximately $100 million. 945 Madison Avenue would house Sotheby's headquarters, including its galleries, exhibition space, and auction room.

Sotheby's could not take over the property until after the Frick Collection's sublease ended in August 2024; it planned to open the new space in 2025, with galleries free and open to the public. Sotheby's also planned to reuse the interior space, indicating that the galleries would be converted into auction rooms, with additional space for dining, observation, and exhibits. In November 2024, the company hired Herzog & de Meuron and PBDW Architects to design the renovation. By early 2025, Stephen Alesch and Robin Standefer were planning to open a restaurant at 945 Madison Avenue. Sotheby's submitted alteration plans to the New York City Landmarks Preservation Commission (LPC) in July 2025, which entailed restoring the sunken courtyard and adding signage. Other modifications included illuminating the facade, adding an elevator, renovating the gallery spaces, and restoring the lobby. The structural framework was left largely intact, except for the elevator, placed near the building's north end.

The Sotheby's headquarters opened on November 8, 2025. Unlike previous occupants, Sotheby's did not charge an admission fee, instead allowing potential buyers to enter free of charge. The New York Observer wrote that, with the building's reopening, Sotheby's was shifting its programs to resemble those of museums. The opening of the La Mercerie Patisserie bakery and the Marcel restaurant were delayed until the next year. The Marcel restaurant ultimately opened in April 2026. The Independent 20th Century art fair began operating at the building from 2026 onward; the Breuer Building provided 75% more space compared with the fair's previous location.

== Impact ==
=== Critical reception ===
==== Contemporary ====
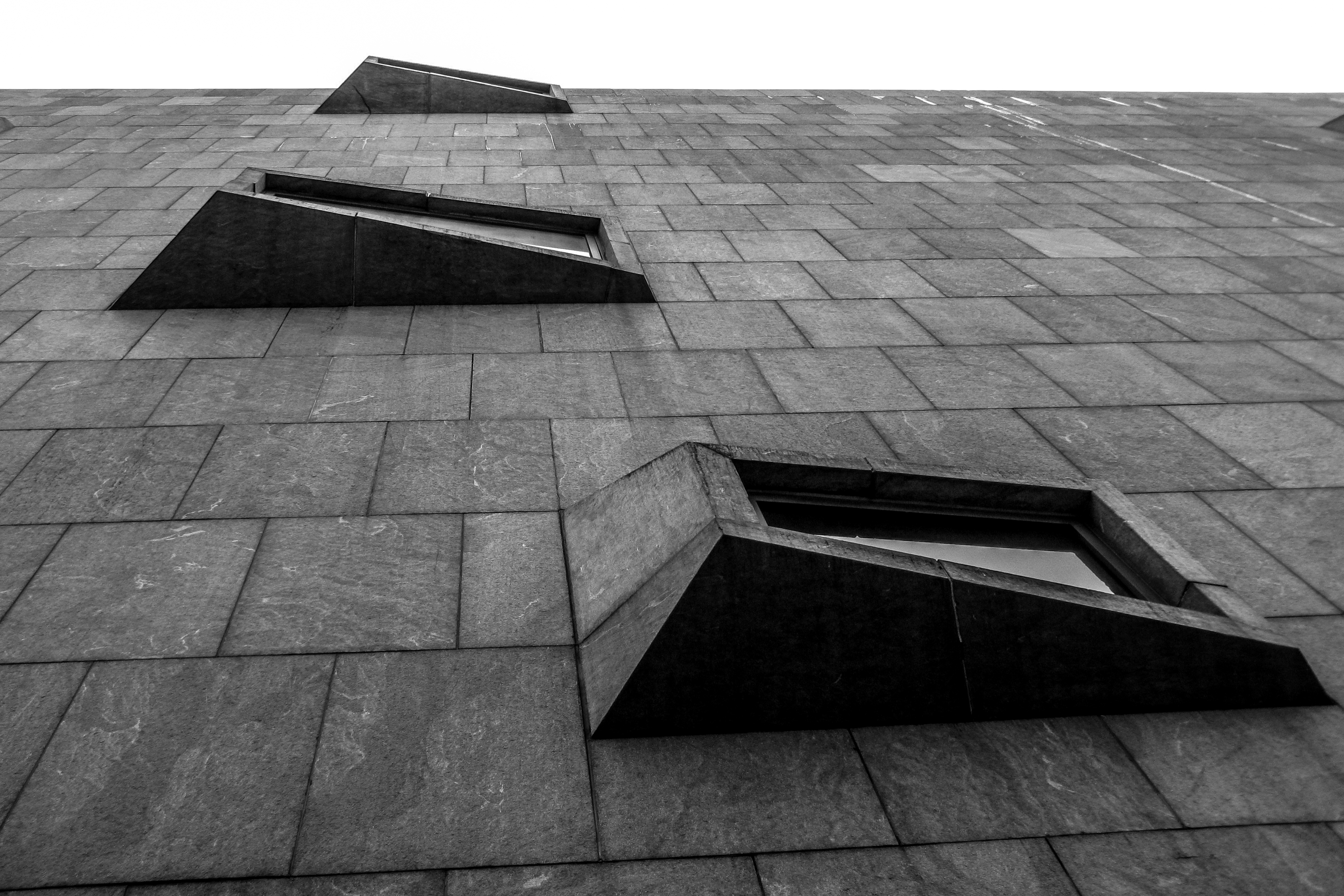
Imposing view from street level

The building attracted large amounts of notice when it was being built. Sanka Knox of The New York Times wrote in July 1966, before the official opening, that some observers considered "Breuer's dark contribution to the area's conventional, fashionable environs [to be] irresistibly romantic", while others likened it to a castle. Architecture and art publications, and general magazines and newspapers, commonly described the building as a masterpiece. Detractors called the building "Madison Avenue's Alcatraz", "Breuer's Big Blooper Bunker", and "Culture's Folly" and facetiously suggested that the building be torn down and rebuilt in an upright manner. The museum's design won the 1968 Albert S. Bard Award for Excellence in Architecture and Urban Design, and Breuer also received the 1970 Honor Award from the AIA Journal for his design.

After the building opened, Life magazine said the museum building was inviting to onlookers despite its appearance and that the interior "is a mixture of roughness and elegance". The Associated Press said that the museum's design provoked conservation but was much unlike the spiral Solomon R. Guggenheim Museum, the classical-style Metropolitan Museum on Fifth Avenue, or the plainly-designed Museum of Modern Art. Henry J. Seldis of the Los Angeles Times said the museum's unusual and controversial design helped draw visitors inside, saying that it was "antithetical to the slickness of hucksterism and the anonymity of architecture for which Madison Avenue has become a synonym. Seldis and The Baltimore Sun's Barbara Gold both described the design as being deliberately detached from the surrounding streetscape, and Gold wrote that this detachment created an oasis for visitors. Wolf Von Eckardt of The Washington Post wrote that the museum building showed that Breuer was "at once a good artist and a good technician", contrasting with the Guggenheim Museum, which he felt did not contribute to the streetscape.

Ada Louise Huxtable of The New York Times referred to the Breuer Building as "harsh and handsome", and a site that grows on the viewer slowly over time, though she admitted it was "the most disliked building in New York". Huxtable noted that the building may be too severe and gloomy for many people's tastes; the same year, art critic Emily Genauer echoed her statement, calling the building "oppressively heavy" and "the Madison Avenue Monster". Similarly, Progressive Architecture criticized the 75th Street facade for being incongruous with the Madison Avenue facade and for appearing empty save for its sculptural windows.

==== Retrospective ====
In 2010, the Times' architecture critic Christopher Gray called it "ornery and menacing", perhaps "New York's most bellicose work of architecture". In a reply, architectural historian Victoria Newhouse called the museum one of the most successfully designed in the world; she had traveled to hundreds in order to write two books about museum architecture. She prompted Huxtable to give a new statement in support of the building, after Gray had taken her words out of context in his review.

Breuer and the Whitney sought to build a controversial structure. Breuer's commission brief (contradicting itself) told him to create an assertive or even controversial structure that represents the Whitney's experimental art, and with a clear definition and monumentality, though aiming to be "as human as possible" and reflect the museum's custom for "warmth and intimacy". Critics supported the controversial design; Peter Blake stated that "Any museum of art that does not, somehow, shake up the neighbor-hood is at least a partial failure. Whatever else Breuer's museum may do to its neighbors, it will never bore them."

When Sotheby's began redesigning the building in 2024, the architectural critic Justin Davidson wrote that the choice of architects was a "little like getting Don DeLillo to tweak Wuthering Heights or Salvador Dalí to update the Mona Lisa". After the building reopened in 2025, observers said that the structure retained nearly all its original character even despite the renovation. ARTnews described the building as having "shifted from contemplation to transaction", and Michael Kimmelman of the New York Times described Sotheby's renovation as "thoughtful and deeply respectful". Edwin Heathcote wrote for the Financial Times that the building "appears to loom over Madison Avenue, even though it is politely contained within its block". In 2026, Architectural Record magazine included the Breuer Building on its list of "the most significant works of American architecture". The historian Barry Bergdoll wrote that the building had a "assured, almost hermetic presence", citing its cantilevered massing, entrance footbridge, and sparse angled windows.

=== Landmark designations ===
Architectural Forum, in 1966, stated that the building was "intended to be a landmark". It was first listed in 1981, as a contributing structure to the Upper East Side Historic District (as designated by the LPC). Despite this, it was listed as a noncontributing structure in the National Register of Historic Places (NRHP) district of the same name in 1984. The museum was independently added to the State Register of Historic Places in June 1986 and was deemed eligible for a standalone entry in the National Register in September of that year. In 2006, the NRHP's historic district listing was revised, with one of the modifications being to now list the museum building as a contributing structure.

After Sotheby's bought 945 Madison Avenue in 2023, preservationists began advocating for the interiors to be designated as a city landmark. In December 2024, before Sotheby's was scheduled to move in, the LPC agreed to host hearings on whether to designate the Breuer Building's interiors as a city landmark. Preservationists had wanted to protect the building's interiors after the LPC had denied interior-landmark designation to two modernist spaces, at 60 Wall Street and 330 West 42nd Street, in the early 2020s. Sotheby's supported the interior-landmark designation, and on May 20, 2025, the LPC designated the facade as an exterior landmark, and it designated some of the spaces (including the lobby and main stairs) as an interior landmark. The building became the LPC's 125th interior-landmark designation; the gallery spaces were excluded from the designation despite advocacy from the preservation group Docomomo International.

=== Influence ===
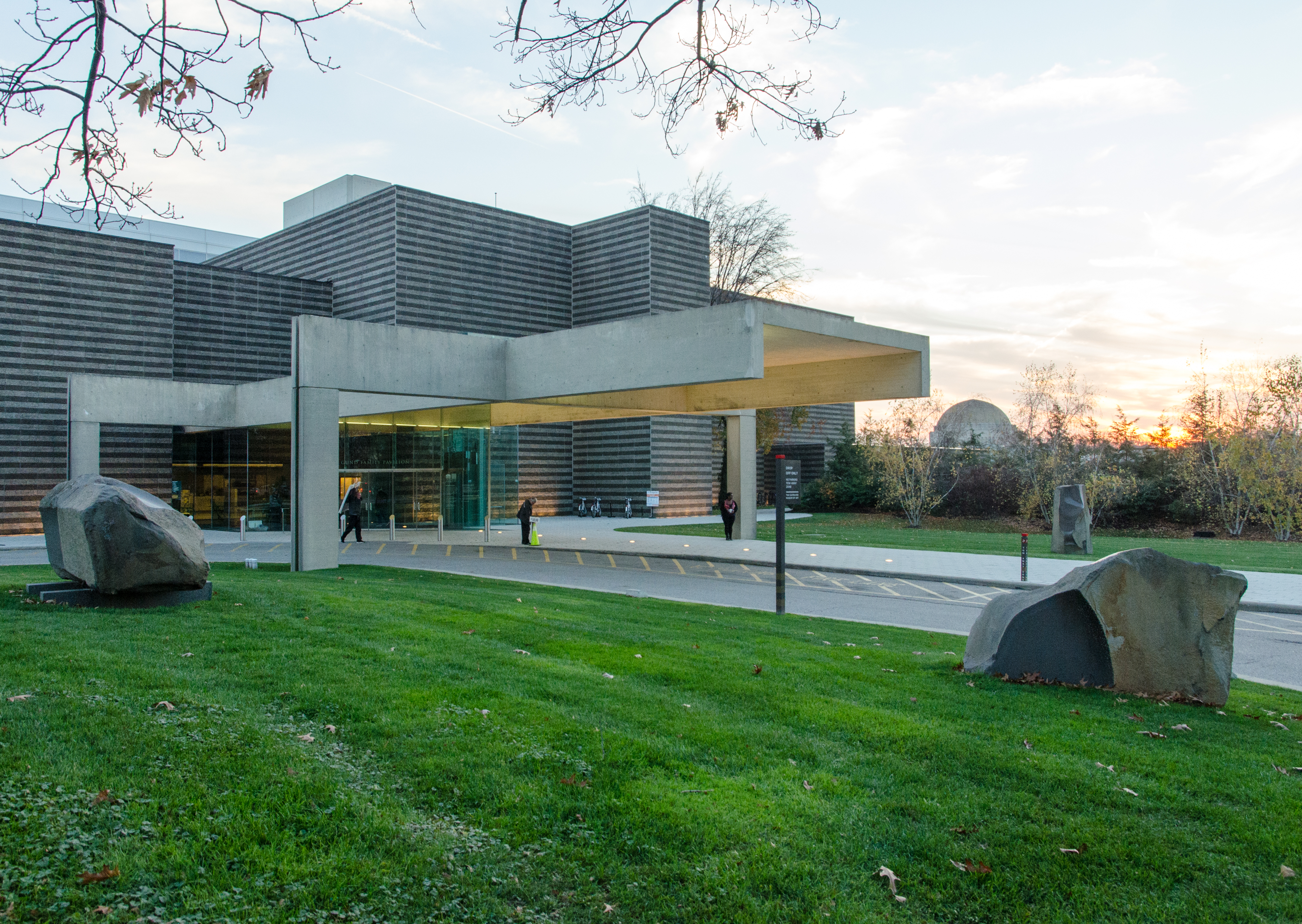
North entrance to the Cleveland Museum of Art

The building was the Whitney Museum's icon for almost 50 years. Breuer's work with the Whitney prompted an invitation to design for the Cleveland Museum of Art. Breuer was the only person invited to submit a design for its north wing, as he showed an understanding for museum needs and understanding for materials with the Whitney project. Breuer's wing opened in 1971, designed with similarities to the Whitney Museum, including a cantilevered concrete entrance canopy outside and a suspended coffered grid inside. Atlanta Public Library director Carlton C. Rochell also nominated Breuer to design the city's new central library in part because of the Whitney commission; Breuer and his partner Hamilton Smith won the commission, paired with the Atlanta firm Stevens & Wilkinson. The Atlanta Central Library, completed in 1980, was characterized in the Atlanta Business Chronicle as a "confident progression" of the Whitney design.

The Breuer Building also influenced Renzo Piano's design of the new Whitney Museum building in Lower Manhattan. The building, opened in 2015, also features cantilevering floor plates that progressively extend over a portion of the street; both museum buildings also feature oversized elevators. A 2017 exhibit at the Met Breuer, Breuer Revisited: New Photographs by Luisa Lambri and Bas Princen, featured artistic photographs of four of Marcel Breuer's works, including 945 Madison Avenue. In 2024, watch company Toledano and Chan introduced their B/1 watch, whose design was inspired by the Breuer Building's windows and the founders' admiration for brutalist architecture.

== See also ==
- List of Brutalist architecture in the United States
- List of Marcel Breuer works
- List of New York City Designated Landmarks in Manhattan from 59th to 110th Streets
