= PZFlex =

- Developer: Weidlinger Associates
- Operating system: Linux and Microsoft Windows
- Type: FEM software
- License: proprietary
- Website: www.pzflex.com

PZFlex is a commercial software package for finite element analysis and virtual prototyping, developed by Weidlinger Associates Inc, USA. It was an outgrowth of the Flex family of codes developed for structural engineering.

The PZFlex code uses both Explicit and implicit methods. It is a time domain solver that specializes in large wave propagation problems, with emphasis on problems featuring electro-mechanical materials such as piezoelectric ceramics.

The explicit solver is designed to tackle both highly non-linear transient phenomena and quasi-static problems. The package is available for Windows and Linux platforms, both 32 and 64-bit systems. It was developed in the later 1980s to meet the demands of the medical ultrasound imaging device industry and has been adopted for use in the automotive, aerospace, sonar, MEMs and Non-destructive testing industries.

It has also become popular with leading ultrasonic research groups in academia due to its flexibility and speed for solving large, complex problems.

PZFlex stands for PiezoElectric Fast, Large and EXplicit.

== Products ==
=== PZFlex ===
The main product is PZFlex which is available in two packages: PZFlex Standard and PZflex Professional. These packages are available as a perpetual or annual license for both Windows and Linux.

==== PZFlex Standard ====
- Explicit time-domain solver
- Thermo-mechanical solver
- Large deformation solver
- GPU Extrapolation

==== PZFlex Professional ====
- Standard solvers
- Piezoelectric solver
- Electrostatic solver (CMUT)
- PseudoSpectral solver

=== PZFlexCloud ===
PZFlexCloud extends the market reach and performance of PZFlex's award-winning engineering software by exploiting the power, elasticity, and ubiquity of the cloud.

== Add-on Products ==
Several add-on products are available for PZFlex packages.

- MIDAS FX+ Pre-processor
- MPI solver
- Steady-State flow solver
- Additional cores
- Additional licenses
- Training
- Technical support and maintenance
- Floating Network License (FNL)
