= Paul Weidlinger =

Hungarian structural engineer

- Born: 22 December 1914; Budapest, Austria-Hungary
- Died: 5 September 1999 (aged 84)
- Education: Brno University of Technology; ETH Zurich
- Spouses: Madeleine Freidli (m. 1940; div. 1963); Solveig Højberg (m. 1964)
- Engineering career
- Discipline: Structural engineering
- Practice name: Weidlinger Associates
- Projects: Weidlinger House

Paul Weidlinger (22 December 1914 – 5 September 1999) was a Hungarian structural engineer.

Paul was born in Budapest on December 22, 1914. He attended the Brno University of Technology, Czechoslovakia followed by Swiss Polytechnic Institute, Zürich. After his graduation in 1937 Weidlinger went to London looking for work. Whilst sitting in his room at 3 Bedford Square reading the telephone directory he came across the name of László Moholy-Nagy. He decided to cold call him and was successful in being taken on as a draftsman. During his stay in London he visited the Paris World Fair and particularly appreciated the Pavilion des Temps Nouveaux, a tent pavilion designed by Le Corbusier and Pierre Jeanneret. From April to August 1938 he was working for Le Corbusier.

After leaving Europe in 1939 he worked and taught in La Paz, Bolivia. In 1943 he moved on to the United States where he started working for Charles Wohlstetter designing modular aircraft hangars that could be assembled quickly. With Charles' brother Albert Wohlstetter and Weidlinger worked at the United States Housing Authority applying these modular principles to domestic residential buildings. He started his own practice, Weidlinger Associates, in 1949.

He designed his home, the Paul and Madeleine Weidlinger House, in Wellfleet, Massachusetts. The house was listed on the National Register of Historic Places in 2014.

He and his first wife, Madeleine (née Freidli, d. mid-1970s), had a son Tom, born c. 1953, and an older daughter.

Paul Weidlinger died on 5 September 1999. His life is chronicled in the 2021 movie The Restless Hungarian, which was directed by his son Tom.
