= Weidlinger Associates =

Weidlinger Associates, Inc.
- Type: Corporation
- Industry: Civil and structural engineering, applied science
- Founded: Washington, DC (1949) (as Paul Weidlinger, Consulting Engineer)
- Headquarters: New York, New York
- Key people: Dr. Raymond Daddazio, president and chief executive officer
- Number of employees: 300 (2010)
- Website: www.wai.com

Weidlinger Associates, Inc., was a U.S.-based structural engineering firm that designs and rehabilitates buildings, bridges, and infrastructure and provides special services in applied science, forensics, and physical security. Weidlinger's clients include corporations, private clients, institutions, and federal, state and local governments. The firm is headquartered in New York City, with branch offices in Massachusetts, Connecticut, New Jersey, California, New Mexico, and Washington, DC. The firm also conducted business as Weidlinger Associates, Ltd., in Scotland, UK.

In 2015, it merged into Thornton Tomasetti.

== History ==
Weidlinger Associates was founded by Paul Weidlinger, a graduate of the Swiss Polytechnic Institute in Zurich, as Paul Weidlinger, Consulting Engineer, in Washington, DC, in 1949. The company moved its headquarters to Manhattan in 1951; was renamed Weidlinger Associates Consulting Engineers in 1974; and was incorporated as Weidlinger Associates, Inc., in Cambridge, Massachusetts, in 1982. Dr. Jeremy Isenberg succeeded Paul Weidlinger as president and CEO in 1993, and Dr. Raymond Daddazio succeeded Dr. Isenberg on January 1, 2006. In 2011, the firm became a general business corporation under the laws of New York State. The firm currently employs approximately 300 people.

=== Merger with Thornton Tomasetti ===
On September 8, 2015 it was announced that Weidlinger Associates had merged with engineering firm Thornton Tomasetti.

== Operations ==
The firm has three business units: Transportation, Buildings, and Applied Science & Investigations, which encompasses investigations, security, and the FLEX family of software products, including PZFlex for virtual prototyping.

=== Transportation ===
Much of Weidlinger's experience in transportation and bridge engineering reflects the rehabilitations the company has designed in the New York metro area for the Brooklyn, Manhattan, RFK (Triborough), Bronx-Whitestone, and Tappan Zee Bridges. The firm's work on these historic structures has broadened Weidlinger's expertise in correcting original defects and preventing future fatigue. Weidlinger has also worked on other major bridges including the Walt Whitman Bridge, Benjamin Franklin Bridge, Cooper River Bridges, Richmond - San Rafael Bridge, Iowa DOT I-74 Bridges, Red River Bridge, and Victory Bridge (New Jersey). The company also designed the steel deck sections of the self-anchored suspension span of the San Francisco-Oakland Bay Bridge. In 2004, Ronald Mayrbaurl and Sante Camo, two Weidlinger principals, published the first-ever guidelines for the inspection and evaluation of suspension bridge cables.

=== Buildings ===
Weidlinger's buildings practice specializes in the design of structural systems for courthouses, embassies, laboratories, museums, office headquarters, stadiums, and other buildings in the U.S. and abroad. A pioneer in high-rise, long-span, cable, and fabric structures, the firm is known for producing quality structural designs that offer economical protection against the consequences of earthquakes, hurricanes, and explosions. Weidlinger uses advanced analysis to optimize structural systems, resolve interdisciplinary conflicts, and guard the safety and comfort of users.

=== Applied Science ===
The company's work in applied science research and advanced analysis has resulted in investigative projects concerning the safety of tall buildings, infrastructure, and military installations, as well as mathematical models to explore shielding naval vessels against mine explosions and protecting loading docks against blast. Weidlinger's software is used by military, public administrative, and corporate clients to simulate structures and devices, enhance design, and assess vulnerability. Some programs combine the effects of several load types. Others use imaging techniques to improve the manufacture of integrated circuits, predict the location of underground petroleum reservoirs, and streamline the design of ultrasonic probes for medical use.

== Awards and recognition ==
Founder Paul Weidlinger and five Weidlinger principals—Melvin Baron, Matthys Levy, Herbert Rothman, Mario Salvadori and Jeremy Isenberg—have been elected as members of the National Academy of Engineering. In 1987, the Franklin Institute awarded Paul Weidlinger the Frank P. Brown Medal. In 2004, Weidlinger Associates was awarded the American Council of Engineering Companies' Grand Conceptor Award for its comprehensive study of the World Trade Center tower collapses. More than 150 Weidlinger projects have received awards for engineering excellence, technical innovation, and creative design. The firm has also been awarded numerous U.S. Small Business Innovation Research grants and Small Business Technology Transfer grants by the U.S. Small Business Administration's Office of Technology, including a Tibbetts Award for advancing technological innovation with PZFlex Software.

== Notable projects ==
=== In progress ===
- San Francisco-Oakland Bay Bridge, California
- United Nations Headquarters, New York, New York
- World Trade Center site, New York, New York

=== Completed ===
- Beinecke Rare Book and Manuscript Library, New Haven, Connecticut
- Benjamin Franklin Bridge, Philadelphia, Pennsylvania (re-decking, cable investigation and cable strengthening study)
- Brooklyn Botanic Garden Visitors Center, New York, New York
- Brooklyn Bridge, New York, New York (current and ongoing rehabilitations)
- CBS Building, New York, New York
- Embassy of the United States, Berlin, Germany
- Estadio Ciudad de La Plata, La Plata, Argentina
- Franklin D. Roosevelt Presidential Library and Museum – Henry A. Wallace Visitor and Education Center, Hyde Park, NY
- Georgia Dome, Atlanta, Georgia
- Georgia-Pacific Tower, Atlanta, Georgia
- Jacob K. Javits Convention Center, New York, New York
- Jeju World Cup Stadium, Seogwipo-si, Jeju, Republic of Korea
- John Hancock Tower, Boston, Massachusetts (investigation)
- Manhattan Bridge, New York, New York (current and ongoing rehabilitations)
- Museo de Arte de Ponce, Ponce, Puerto Rico
- Museum of Fine Arts, Boston – Art of the Americas Wing, Boston, Massachusetts
- National Museum of the Marine Corps, Quantico, Virginia
- National Aquarium in Baltimore, Maryland
- New England Aquarium Giant Ocean Tank, Boston, Massachusetts
- New York Marriott Marquis, New York, New York
- One Lincoln Street, Boston, Massachusetts
- Robert H. Jackson United States Courthouse, Buffalo, NY
- Rose Center for Earth and Space, New York, New York
- September 11 Museum, New York, NY
- Solow Building, New York, New York
- Postcards, Staten Island, New York
- The Lawn, University of Virginia (South Lawn)
- Tomorrow Square, Shanghai, China
- 33 Arch Street, Boston, Massachusetts
- Wat Nawamintararachutis Thai Temple and Meditation Center, Raynham, Massachusetts
