= National Register of Historic Places listings in Cape Cod National Seashore =

This is a list of the National Register of Historic Places listings in Cape Cod National Seashore.

This is intended to be a complete list of the properties and districts on the National Register of Historic Places in Cape Cod National Seashore, Massachusetts, United States. The locations of National Register properties and districts for which the latitude and longitude coordinates are included below, may be seen in a Google map.

There are 25 properties and districts listed on the National Register in the park, one of which is a National Historic Landmark.

This National Park Service list is complete through NPS recent listings posted May 1, 2026.

== Current listings ==
	Name on the Register	Image	Date listed	Location	City or town	Description
1	Ahearn House and Summer House	Ahearn House and Summer House	November 21, 1984 (#84000575)	Pamet Point Rd. 41°57′33″N 70°02′42″W	Wellfleet	
2	Atwood-Higgins Historic District	Atwood-Higgins Historic District	July 28, 2010 (#10000508)	Bound Brook Island Rd. 41°57′12″N 70°03′26″W	Wellfleet	Expansion of an earlier listing of the Thomas Atwood House.
3	Fort Hill Rural Historic District	Fort Hill Rural Historic District	April 5, 2001 (#00001656)	Fort Hill Rd, Cape Cod National Seashore; 41°49′10″N 69°57′56″W	Eastham	
4	The Beacon	The Beacon	June 15, 1987 (#87001527)	Off Cable Rd. 41°50′42″N 69°57′36″W	Eastham	The longest-used of the Three Sisters of Nauset. The other two are listed separately (see Three Sisters of Nauset (Twin Lights) below); the three decommissioned lighthouses have since been reunited.
5	French Cable Hut	French Cable Hut	April 22, 1976 (#76000153)	East of North Eastham at the junction of Cable Rd. and Ocean View Dr. 41°51′34″N 69°57′07″W	North Eastham	
6	Ruth and Robert Hatch Jr. House	Ruth and Robert Hatch Jr. House	February 25, 2014 (#14000018)	309 Bound Brook Way; 41°57′21″N 70°04′29″W	Wellfleet	Mid 20th Century Modern Residential Architecture on Outer Cape Cod MPS
7	Jedediah Higgins House	Jedediah Higgins House	November 21, 1984 (#84000550)	Higgins Hollow Rd. 42°00′35″N 70°03′06″W	North Truro	
8	Highland House	Highland House	June 5, 1975 (#75000157)	Off U.S. Route 6 on Cape Cod National Seashore; 42°02′25″N 70°03′56″W	Truro	
9	Highland Light Station	Highland Light Station	June 15, 1987 (#87001463)	Off U.S. Route 6; 42°02′48″N 70°04′10″W	Truro	
10	Peter Kugel House	Peter Kugel House	February 25, 2014 (#14000019)	188 Long Pond Rd. 41°56′40″N 69°59′53″W	Wellfleet	Mid 20th Century Modern Residential Architecture on Outer Cape Cod MPS
11	Samuel and Minette Kuhn House	Samuel and Minette Kuhn House	February 25, 2014 (#14000020)	420 Griffins Island Rd. 41°56′45″N 70°04′06″W	Wellfleet	Mid 20th Century Modern Residential Architecture on Outer Cape Cod MPS
12	Marconi Wireless Station Site	Marconi Wireless Station Site	May 2, 1975 (#75000158)	1 mile northeast of Cape Cod National Seashore; 41°54′50″N 69°58′20″W	South Wellfleet	
13	Nauset Archeological District	Nauset Archeological District	April 19, 1993 (#93000607)	Fort Hill Road area 41°49′08″N 69°57′46″W	Eastham	
14	Nauset Beach Light	Nauset Beach Light	June 15, 1987 (#87001484)	Nauset Beach; 41°51′15″N 69°57′06″W	Eastham	
15	John Newcomb House	John Newcomb House	September 15, 1988 (#88001457)	near Williams Pond; 41°57′53″N 70°00′23″W	Wellfleet	Also known as Thoreau's "House of the Wellfleet Oysterman"
16	Old Harbor U.S. Life Saving Station	Old Harbor U.S. Life Saving Station	August 18, 1975 (#75000159)	Race Point Beach; 41°41′52″N 69°55′46″W	Provincetown	Originally located at Nauset Beach in Chatham
17	Edward Penniman House and Barn	Edward Penniman House and Barn	May 28, 1976 (#76000155)	South of Eastham at Fort Hill and Governor Prence Rds. 41°49′07″N 69°57′57″W	Eastham	
18	Pine Grove Cemetery	Pine Grove Cemetery	March 20, 2013 (#13000096)	Cemetery Rd. 41°58′34″N 70°03′34″W	Truro	
19	Race Point Light Station	Race Point Light Station	June 15, 1987 (#87001482)	Race Point Beach; 42°03′40″N 70°14′33″W	Provincetown	
20	Anthony and Allison Sirna Studio	Anthony and Allison Sirna Studio	February 25, 2014 (#14000021)	60 Way #4; 41°57′29″N 69°59′38″W	Wellfleet	Mid 20th Century Modern Residential Architecture on Outer Cape Cod MPS
21	Samuel Smith Tavern Site	Samuel Smith Tavern Site	November 11, 1977 (#77000108)	Great Island; 41°55′12″N 70°03′26″W	Wellfleet	17th century tavern site accessible via Great Island Trail
22	Three Sisters of Nauset (Twin Lights)	Three Sisters of Nauset (Twin Lights)	June 15, 1987 (#87001502)	Off Cable Rd. 41°50′42″N 69°57′36″W	Eastham	Two of the three decommissioned lighthouses of the Three Sisters of Nauset; The Beacon (listed separately) is the third. At the time of their nomination, these two lights were separate from The Beacon; they have since been reunited.
23	Vera and Laszlo Tisza House	Vera and Laszlo Tisza House	February 25, 2014 (#14000022)	2 Deer Trail; 41°57′36″N 69°59′55″W	Wellfleet	Mid 20th Century Modern Residential Architecture on Outer Cape Cod MPS
24	Truro Highlands Historic District	Truro Highlands Historic District	November 22, 2011 (#11000823)	Highland Light Rd. 42°02′22″N 70°03′44″W	Truro	Includes Highland Light, Highland House, and other buildings along Highland Light Road.
25	Paul and Madeleine Weidlinger House	Paul and Madeleine Weidlinger House	February 25, 2014 (#14000023)	54 Valley Rd. 41°57′36″N 70°00′24″W	Wellfleet	Mid 20th Century Modern Residential Architecture on Outer Cape Cod MPS

== See also ==
- National Register of Historic Places listings in Barnstable County, Massachusetts
- List of National Historic Landmarks in Massachusetts
- National Register of Historic Places listings in Massachusetts
