= Higgins House =

Higgins House may refer to:

United States

- Arizona Rancho in Holbrook, Arizona
- Adams-Higgins House in Spencer, Iowa
- E.H. Higgins House in Hopkinsville, Kentucky
- Jedediah Higgins House, in North Truro, Massachusetts
- Thomas Atwood House in Atwood–Higgins Historic District, in Wellfleet, Massachusetts
- Lansdown-Higgins House, near Jefferson City, Missouri
- Francis B. Higgins House in Newberry, South Carolina
- Hardesty-Higgins House, in Harrisonburg, Virginia
