= Coast Guard Beach =

Coast Guard Beach may refer to either of two beaches in the Cape Cod National Seashore in Massachusetts.

- Coast Guard Beach (Eastham, Massachusetts)
- Coast Guard Beach (Truro, Massachusetts)
