= Peter Kugel House =

Historic house in Massachusetts, United States

- U.S. National Register of Historic Places
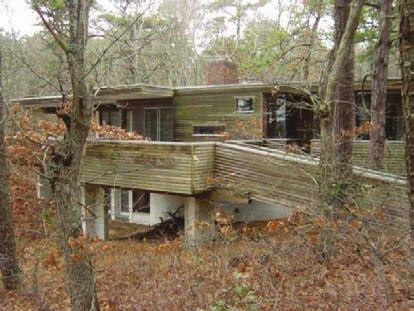
- Park Service photo, undated

- Location within Cape Cod Location within Massachusetts Location within the United States
- Location: 188 Way 626, Wellfleet, Massachusetts
- Coordinates: 41°56′40″N 69°59′53″W
- Built: 1970
- Architect: Charlie Zehnder
- Architectural style: Modern Cape
- NRHP reference No.: 14000019
- Added to NRHP: February 25, 2014

The Peter Kugel House, also known as the Kugel-Gips House, is a historic house at 188 Way 626, Wellfleet, Massachusetts, in Cape Cod National Seashore. It is one of a modest number of surviving houses in Wellfleet that combine elements of Modern architecture with traditional Cape Cod architecture. This house was built in 1970 to a design by architect Charlie Zehnder, who took his design inspiration for it from the Fallingwater estate designed by Frank Lloyd Wright.

The house was listed on the National Register of Historic Places in 2014.

== See also ==
- National Register of Historic Places listings in Barnstable County, Massachusetts
- National Register of Historic Places listings in Cape Cod National Seashore
