= Three Sisters of Nauset =

- Three Sisters of Nauset (Twin Lights)
- U.S. National Register of Historic Places
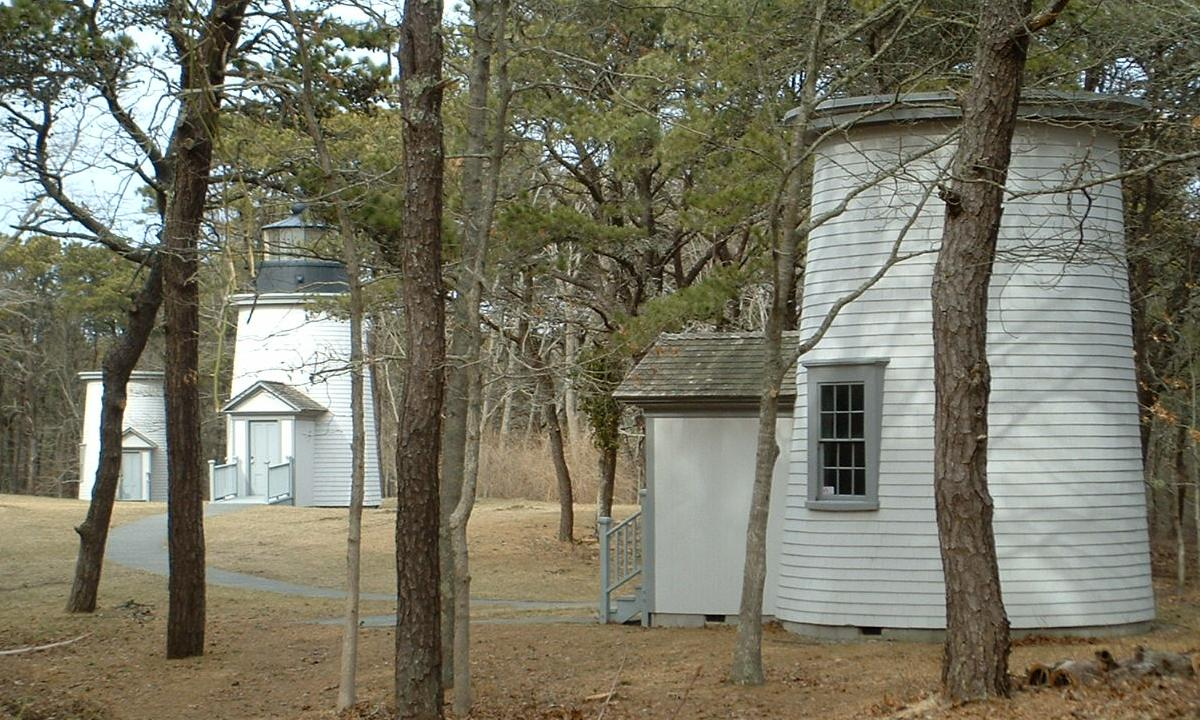
- This image shows all three lights; The Beacon is in the center.

- Location within Cape Cod
- Location: Eastham, Massachusetts
- Coordinates: 41°51′34″N 69°57′25″W
- Built: 1892
- MPS: Lighthouses of Massachusetts TR
- NRHP reference No.: 87001502
- Added to NRHP: June 15, 1987

The Three Sisters of Nauset are a trio of historic lighthouses off Cable Road in Eastham, Massachusetts. The original three brick towers fell into the sea due to erosion in 1890 and were replaced with wooden towers on brick foundations in 1892. The Sisters were decommissioned in 1911 but one of them, the Beacon, was moved back from the shoreline and attached to the keeper's house. It continued to operate but was replaced by a new steel tower, the Nauset Light, in 1923.

== Construction ==
The first set of lighthouses were commissioned by Congress in 1837 and built for $10,000, to provide for a light halfway along the eastern coast of Cape Cod. Because there was one light (the Cape Cod Light) in Truro, and two lights (the Twin Lights) in Chatham, it was decided that there should be three lights to distinguish between the other lights. Built 150 feet (46 m) apart in a straight line along the crest of the cliffs, they were brick, 15 feet (4.6 m) tall and wide at the base, and 9 feet (2.7 m) wide at the lantern deck. Each was painted white with black lantern decks, which lent to their looking like three ladies with white dresses and black bonnets – the birth of the name "Three Sisters."

=== Replacement lighthouses ===
By 1890, however, the three lights were dangerously close to the cliff's edge. Since it was impossible at the time to move the three lights intact, three 22-foot (6.7 m) wooden lighthouses with otherwise identical markings were built in 1892 to replace the former lights, each built 30 feet (9.1 m) west of their original sites and using the lenses from the originals.

=== The Beacon ===
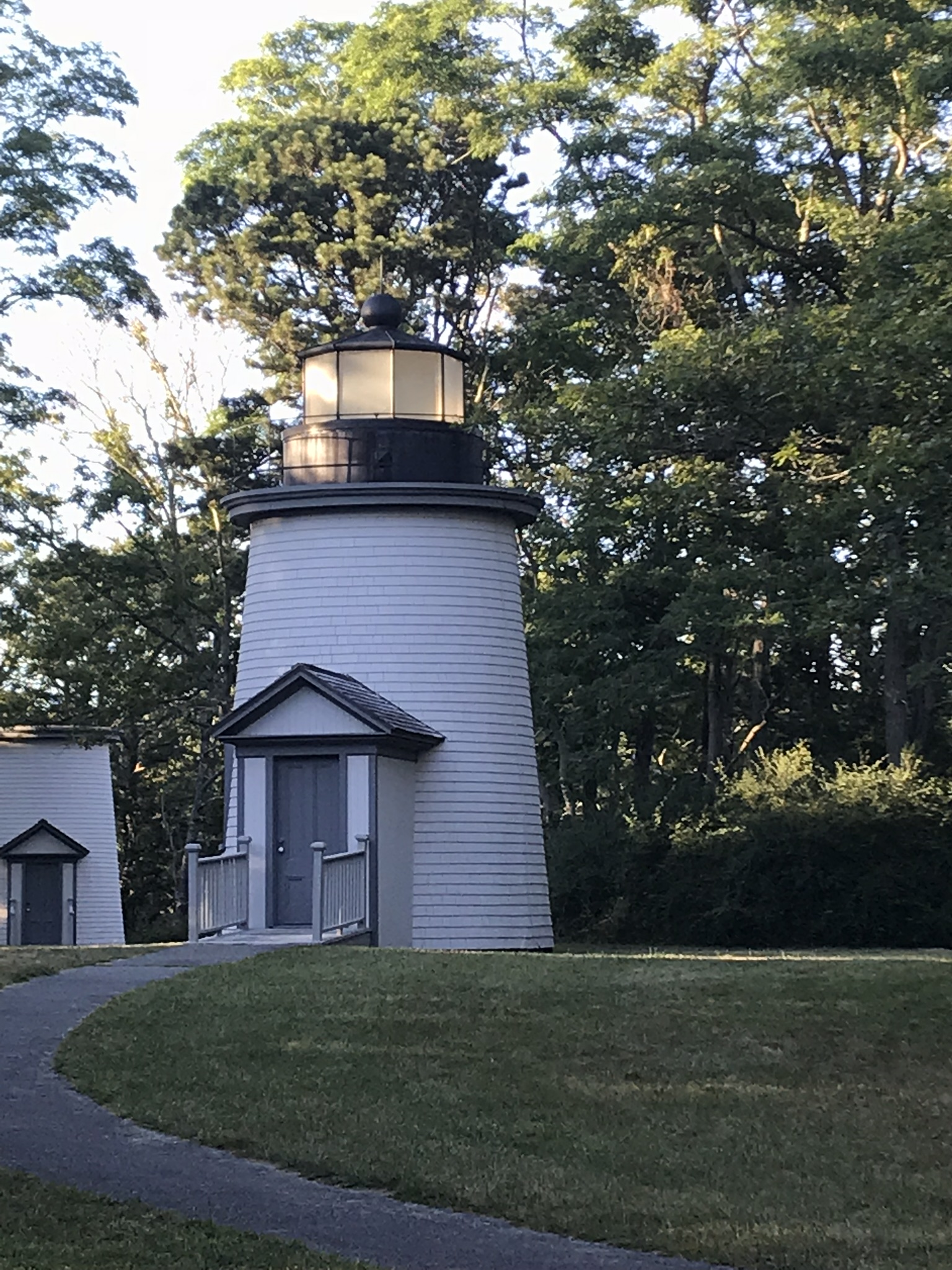
The Beacon

However, erosion continued, and by 1911, with the northernmost light only eight feet from the cliff, it was decided to move the lights back again. At this time only the center light was lit, with a triple flash in homage of her two decommissioned sisters, and became known as The Beacon. In 1918, with both their lanterns removed, the decommissioned north and south lights were purchased and incorporated into a summer cottage along Cable Road. The Beacon, which was now attached to the oil house, was in disrepair.

After it was decommissioned, the northern of the two towers of Chatham Light was moved north to Eastham in 1923, to a site near the original lights, becoming the Nauset Light.

== Renovation for the National Register of Historic Places ==
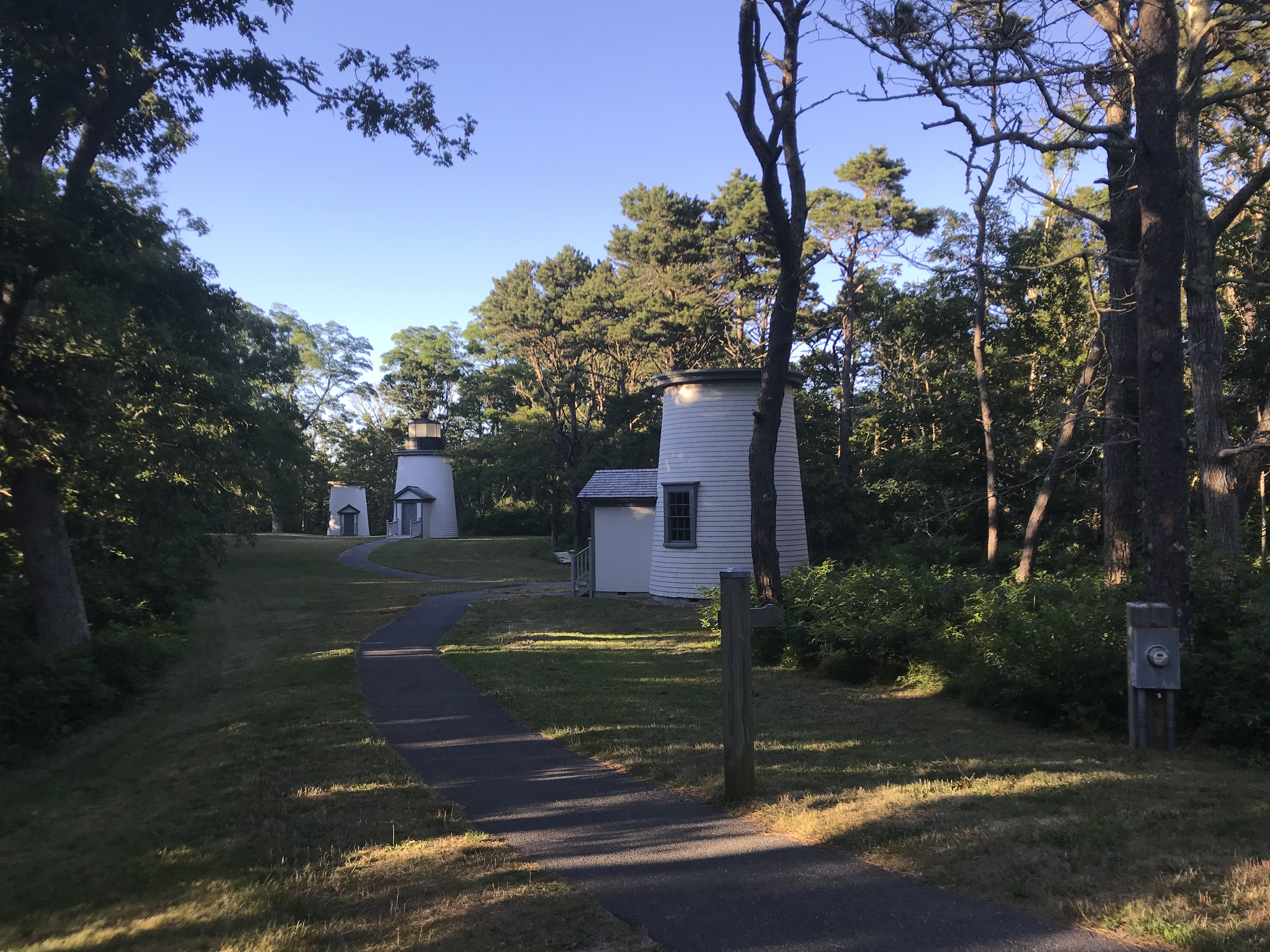
Lighthouses in their new position.

The Beacon was incorporated into a summer cottage, where it stayed until 1975, when it was purchased by the National Park Service. It was moved to a field to join its sisters, who had been bought ten years earlier, and, following their listing on the National Register of Historic Places, the three were renovated to their current state, less than 400 yards (370 m) west of their replacement and in their original configuration.

In 1983, the National Park Service moved the Three Sisters 1,800 feet west of Nauset Light, lined up in their original configuration. A restoration was completed in 1989; tours are operated by National Seashore staff.

== See also ==
- National Register of Historic Places listings in Cape Cod National Seashore
- National Register of Historic Places listings in Barnstable County, Massachusetts
