= CCNS =

CCNS may refer to:

- Cloud condensation nuclei
- Cape Cod National Seashore
- A Cell Cycle Non-Specific drug. A medication used during chemotherapy (example: anthracycline antibiotics).
