= Vera and Laszlo Tisza House =

Historic house in Massachusetts, United States

- U.S. National Register of Historic Places
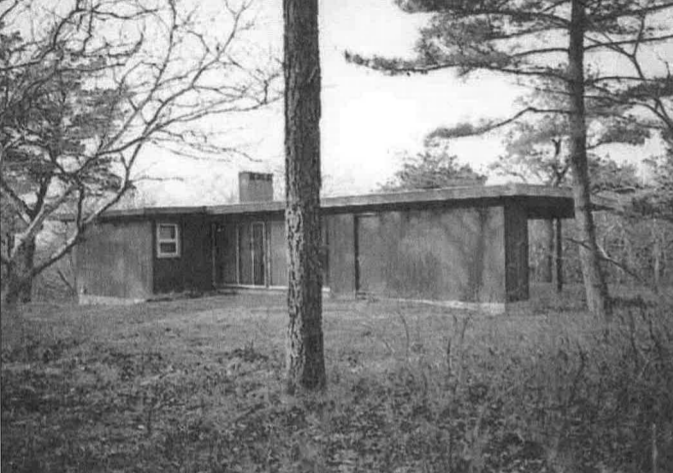
- Park Service photo, 1972

- Location within Cape Cod Location within Massachusetts Location within the United States
- Location: 2 Deer Trail, Wellfleet, Massachusetts
- Coordinates: 41°57′36″N 69°59′55″W
- Area: 2.8 acres (1.1 ha)
- Built: 1960
- Architect: Olav Hammarstrom
- Architectural style: Modern Cape
- NRHP reference No.: 14000022
- Added to NRHP: February 25, 2014

The Vera and Laszlo Tisza House is a historic house at 2 Deer Trail (a cul-de-sac off Gross Hill Road) in the remote northeastern part of Wellfleet, Massachusetts, within the Cape Cod National Seashore. It is one of a number of surviving houses in Wellfleet that combine elements of Modern architecture with traditional Cape Cod architecture. The house was designed by Olav Hammarstrom, a protégé of Eero Saarinen, for Vera and László Tisza. The house is a T-shaped one-story structure with a central breezeway that provides views of the surrounding woodlands to much of the house. The main block, which is divided by the breezeway, measures 41 by 25 feet, with a 31 by 14 foot section added perpendicular to its north end. A flat roof, covered with rolled asphalt, extends for two feet beyond the edges of the house, and has exposed rafters that are visible both inside and outside the house. There is a recessed porch on the south side of the main block.

The house remained in the couple's hands, passing to Vera when they divorced in 1963. In 1974 she sold the property to the National Park Service, retaining a 15-year right of use. The Park Service is now responsible for its maintenance.

The house was listed on the National Register of Historic Places in 2014.

== See also ==
- National Register of Historic Places listings in Barnstable County, Massachusetts
- National Register of Historic Places listings in Cape Cod National Seashore
