= Samuel Smith Tavern Site =

- U.S. National Register of Historic Places
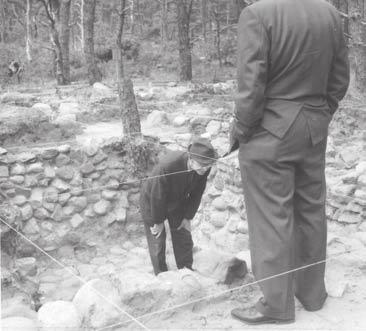
- Smith Tavern excavation, c. 1970

- Location within Cape Cod Location within Massachusetts Location within the United States
- Nearest city: Wellfleet, Massachusetts
- Coordinates: 41.919906°N 70.057118°W
- Built: 1690
- NRHP reference No.: 77000108
- Added to NRHP: November 11, 1977

The Samuel Smith Tavern Site is a historic archeological site in Wellfleet, Massachusetts, United States. It encompasses the remains of a late 17th-century tavern operated by Samuel Smith, owner of Great Island, which shelters Wellfleet Harbor. The tavern site is located within the Cape Cod National Seashore, and is accessible via the Great Island Trail. The site was excavated in 1969–70, recovering thousands of artifacts, including clay pipes, drinking artifacts, a harpoon, and a chopping block fashioned from whale vertebrae.

The tavern site was listed on the National Register of Historic Places in 1977.

== See also ==
- National Register of Historic Places listings in Barnstable County, Massachusetts
- National Register of Historic Places listings in Cape Cod National Seashore
