= Race Point Light =

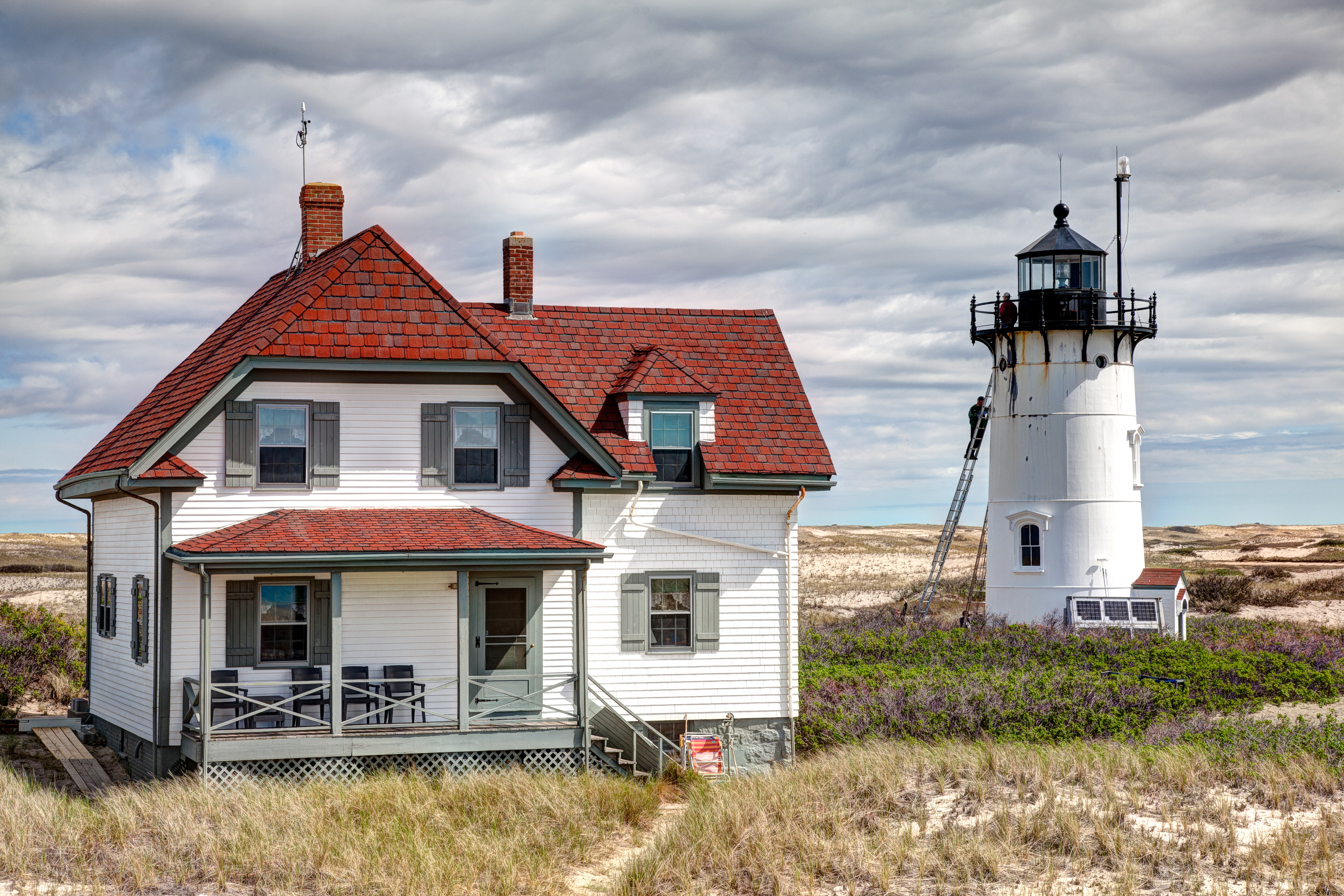
- The lighthouse gets a fresh coat of paint in 2012
- Location: Cape Cod
- Coordinates: 42°3′44.4″N 70°14′34.9″W

Tower
- Constructed: 1816
- Foundation: Natural/emplaced
- Construction: Iron plate with brick interior
- Automated: 1972
- Height: 45 feet (14 m)
- Shape: Conical
- Markings: White with black lantern
- Heritage: National Register of Historic Places listed place

Light
- First lit: 1876 (current structure)
- Focal height: 41 feet (12 m) above mean sea level
- Lens: Fourth-order Fresnel lens (original), LED lens (current)
- Range: 16 nautical miles (30 km; 18 mi)
- Characteristic: Fl W 10s
- Race Point Light Station
- U.S. National Register of Historic Places
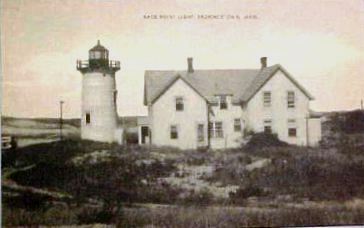
- 1911 postcard

- Location within Cape Cod
- Location: Race Point Beach, Provincetown, Massachusetts
- Coordinates: 42°3′44.4″N 70°14′41″W
- Area: 10 acres (4.0 ha)
- Built: 1876
- Architectural style: Italianate
- MPS: Lighthouses of Massachusetts TR
- NRHP reference No.: 87001482
- Added to NRHP: June 15, 1987

Race Point Light is a historic lighthouse on Cape Cod, in Provincetown, Massachusetts; it is on the National Register of Historic Places. The original tower, first illuminated in 1816, was replaced in 1876 with the current 45-foot-tall (14 m) tall iron-plated tower and a new keeper's dwelling. The American Lighthouse Foundation operates the property and rents out two buildings for overnight stays. The actual light is maintained by the Coast Guard. The site is reached by walking about 45 minutes over sand; with a National Park Service Oversand Permit, a four-wheel-drive vehicle can be used.

== History ==
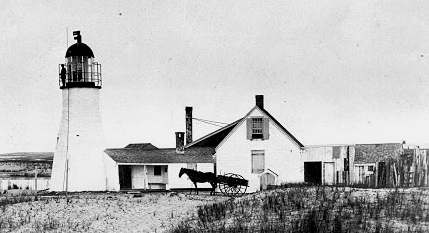
The original "rubble stone" tower and keepers's house

Race Point Light was first established in 1816, the third light on Cape Cod (after Highland Light (1797) and Chatham Light (1808). The original light was a 25 feet (7.6 m) rubblestone tower that featured one of the earliest rotating beacons, which distinguished it from others on Cape Cod. In 1858 the light got a fourth order Fresnel lens and, in 1874, a second keeper's quarters.

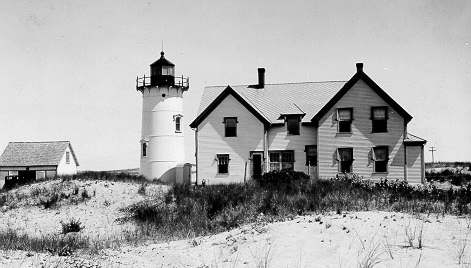
Race Point Lighthouse after 1876

In 1876, after significant deterioration of the original tower, it was replaced with a 45-foot tall cast iron tower lined with brick. The Fresnel lens was installed into the new tower. The original keeper's stone house was removed and replaced with one made of wood. Race Point Light was electrified in 1957. The larger keeper's house was removed in 1960 and the other was updated. The light was automated in 1972.

In 1995 the group updated the keeper's house and began offering rooms for overnight stays in 1998. A solar electrical system was installed in October 2003, and a wind turbine back-up generator was added in 2007. The light now uses a solar-powered VRB-25 optic with 400,000 candlepower, operated by the Coast Guard. Operation of the site is by the American Lighthouse Foundation. Tours are available on the first and third Saturdays from June until October. Both the Keeper's House and the Whistle House are available for overnight rental.

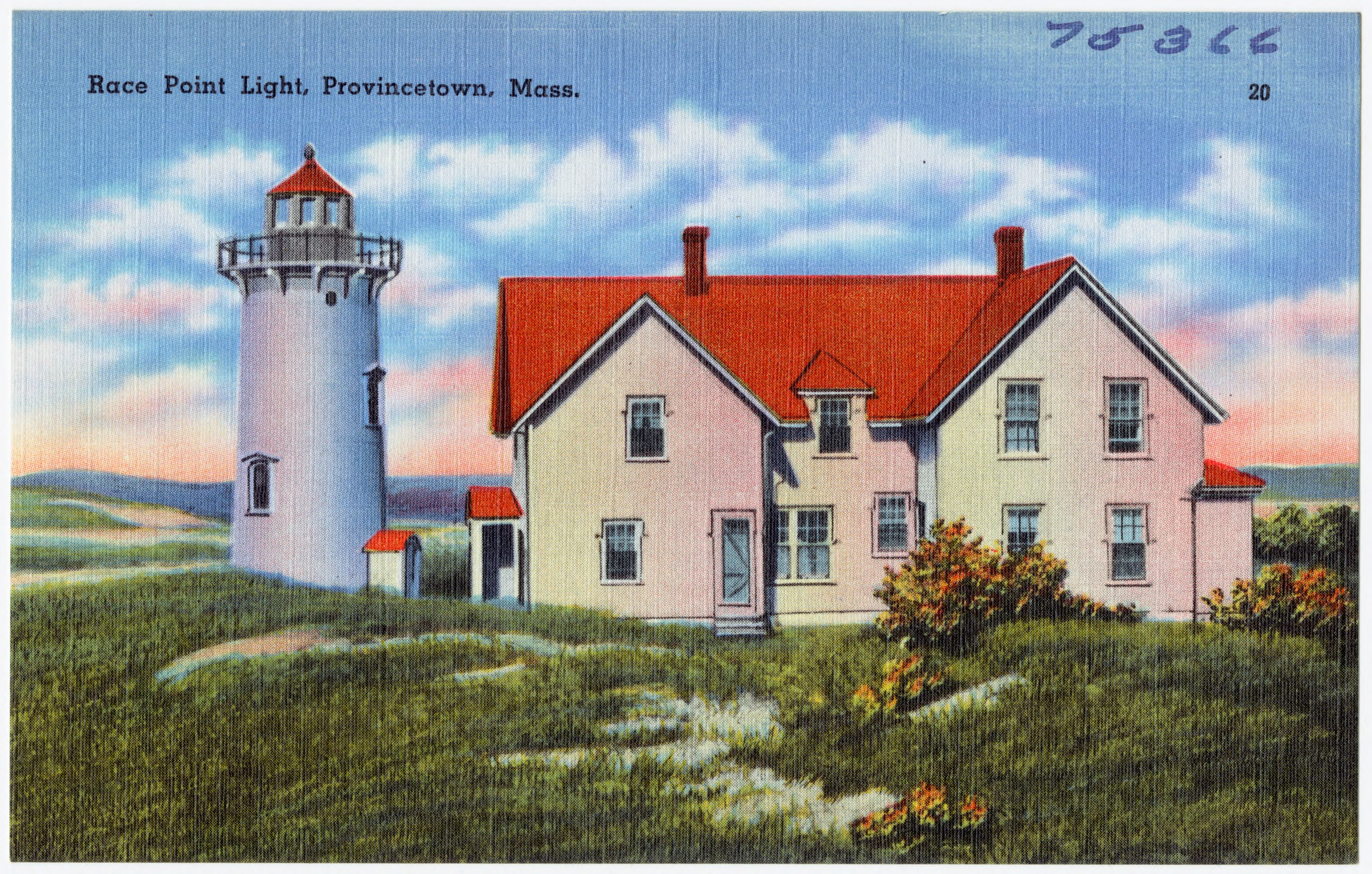
Race Point Light, postcard, circa 1930-1945

Race Point Light was added to the National Register of Historic Places as Race Point Light Station on June 15, 1987, reference number 87001482.

=== Light keepers ===
The following keepers maintained the light over the years, some for a surprisingly short time. Several had been assistant keepers for years prior to their promotion to head keeper.

- Joshua Dyer (1816 – 1822)
- Elijah Dyer (1822 – 1847)
- Lemuel Cook (1847 – 1853)
- Waterman Crocker (1853 – 1861)
- Josiah Ghenn (1861 – 1870)
- James Cushman (1870 – 1885)
- Thomas V. Mullins (1885 – 1892)
- Charles A. Havender (1892 – 1904)
- Samuel S. Smith (1904 – 1909)
- Roscoe G. Lopaus (1909)
- Waldo Leighton (1909 – 1915)
- William H. Lowther (1915 – 1935)
- James W. Hinckley (1935 – 1937)
- Javan D. York (1938 – 1942)
- Theodore M. Koswoski (1944)
- James O’Brien (1944)
- Joseph L. Collette (1944)
- Osborne E. Hallett (1945 – 1955)
- Elias J. Martinez (1955 – 1956)
- Gottfried Schiffers (1956 – 1958)
- Elias J. Martinez (1958 – 1959)
- Aubrey T. Griggs (1959 – 1960)

== See also ==
- Cape Cod National Seashore
- Long Point Light
- Wood End Light
- Nauset Light
