= Anthony and Allison Sirna Studio =

- U.S. National Register of Historic Places
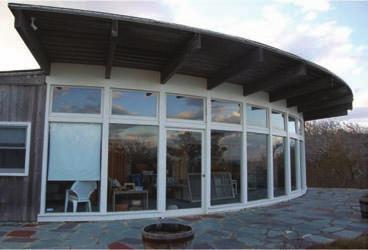

- Location within Cape Cod Location within Massachusetts Location within the United States
- Location: 60 Way #4, Wellfleet, Massachusetts
- Coordinates: 41°57′29″N 69°59′38″W
- Built: 1960
- Architect: Victor Civkin
- Architectural style: Modern
- NRHP reference No.: 14000021
- Added to NRHP: February 25, 2014

The Anthony and Allison Sirna Studio is a historic artist's studio at 60 Way #4 in Wellfleet, Massachusetts. It is one of a modest number of surviving buildings in Wellfleet that combine elements of Modern architecture with traditional Cape Cod architecture. The studio was built in 1960 to a design by Victor Civkin; it has a trapezoidal plan with nine large vertical window bays. The building is within the bounds of the Cape Cod National Seashore, and is owned by the National Park Service.

The house was listed on the National Register of Historic Places in 2014.

== See also ==
- National Register of Historic Places listings in Barnstable County, Massachusetts
- National Register of Historic Places listings in Cape Cod National Seashore
