= Samuel and Minette Kuhn House =

Historic house in Massachusetts, United States

- U.S. National Register of Historic Places
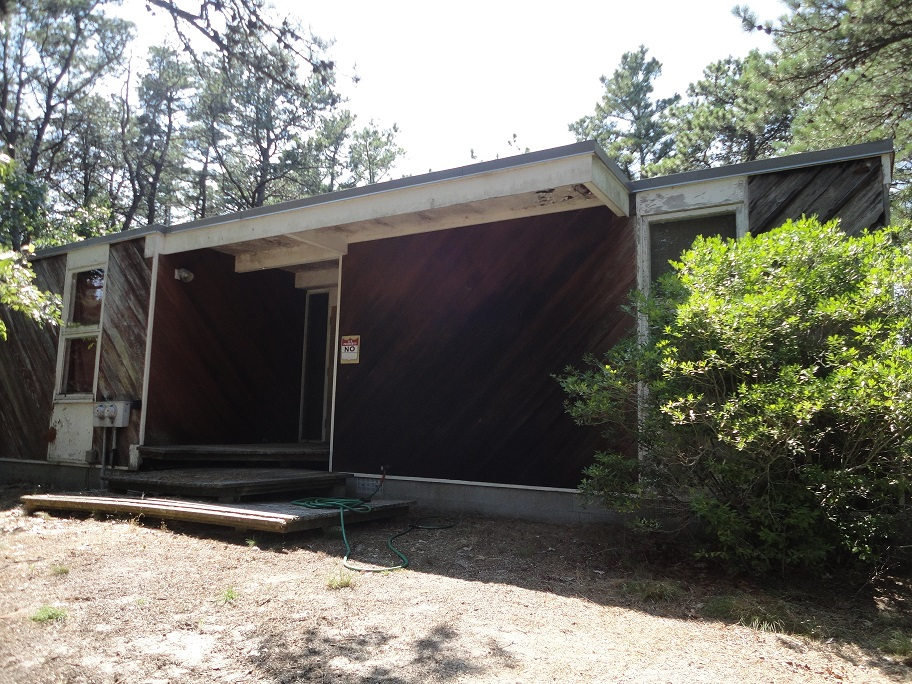
- NPS image, 2012

- Location within Cape Cod Location within Massachusetts Location within the United States
- Location: 420 Griffins Island Rd, Wellfleet Wellfleet, Massachusetts
- Coordinates: 41°56′44.6″N 70°4′5.8″W
- Built: 1961
- Architect: Nathaniel Saltonstall
- Architectural style: Modern Cape
- NRHP reference No.: 14000020
- Added to NRHP: February 25, 2014

The Samuel and Minette Kuhn House is a historic house in Wellfleet, Massachusetts. It is one of a modest number of surviving houses in Wellfleet that combine elements of Modern architecture with traditional Cape Cod architecture. The single-story wood-frame house was built in 1960 to a design by Nathaniel Saltonstall, founder of Boston's Institute of Contemporary Art. The Kuhns were exposed to Saltonstall's work when they stayed at The Colony, another property he designed that is located nearby on Griffins Island. The house incorporates Bauhaus design principles of simplicity and economy, and is based around the idea of square modules, which are repeated on small, medium and large scales, affecting the room shapes and sizes, windows, and interior furnishings and decorations. The house, which is within the bounds of the Cape Cod National Seashore, was sold by the Kuhns to the National Park Service in 1973, but they retained right of occupancy for 25 years. The Park Service began using the property for employee housing in 2003.

The house was listed on the National Register of Historic Places in 2014.

== See also ==
- National Register of Historic Places listings in Barnstable County, Massachusetts
- National Register of Historic Places listings in Cape Cod National Seashore
