= Doane Rock =

Rock formation in Eastham, Massachusetts, U.S.

Coordinates: 41°50′39″N 69°57′28″W

Doane Rock

Doane Rock is a glacial erratic located in Eastham, Massachusetts on the grounds of the Cape Cod National Seashore. It is the largest exposed boulder on Cape Cod. It stands 18 feet (5.5 m) high and extends below the ground an estimated 12 feet (3.7 m).

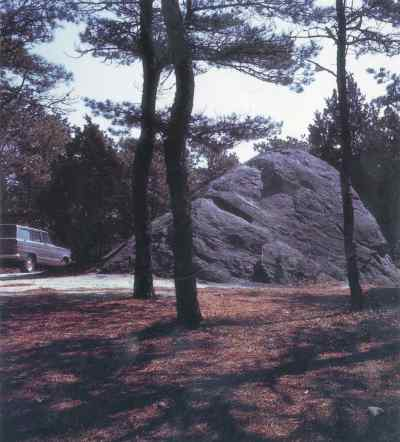
Doane Rock

This boulder is named after Deacon John Doane, one of Eastham's original settlers. It has also been called Enochs or Enos rock for the deacon's son, as well as Great Rock. The rock was left by the glaciers (Laurentide Ice Sheet; 18,000–12,000 years ago) between what is now the Salt Pond Visitors Center and Coast Guard Beach.

Doane Rock is located just off Doane Road about one mile past the Salt Pond Visitor Center on National Park Service land. Limited parking is available near the rock.

== See also ==
- List of individual rocks
