= Nauset Light Beach =

Beach in Eastham, Massachusetts, US

- Beach
- Coordinates: 41°51′35″N 69°57′05″W
- Location: Eastham, Massachusetts, Cape Cod

Dimensions
  - Length: 1 mile (1.6 km)
- Access: Cable Dr. to Ocean View Dr., Eastham

Nauset Light Beach is a one-mile-long beach on the east coast of outer Cape Cod in Eastham, Massachusetts. It is part of Cape Cod National Seashore. Historic Nauset Light, which visitors can tour, is just inland from the beach. It is one mile north from Coast Guard Beach.

The beach is backed by massive sand dunes which results in steep stairs down to the beautiful sandy beach. It is a very popular beach (the parking lot can fill by 10 a.m.) and often has large waves great for surfing and bodyboarding.

Restrooms and bathhouse are open seasonally.
