= Old Village =

Old Village may refer to:

- Old Village, a historic district in Plymouth, Michigan, United States
- Old Village Historic District (Chatham, Massachusetts), listed on the National Register of Historic Places listings in Massachusetts, United States
- Old Village Historic District (Monroe, Michigan), listed on the National Register of Historic Places listings in Michigan, United States
