= Jedediah Higgins House =

Historic house in Massachusetts, United States

- U.S. National Register of Historic Places
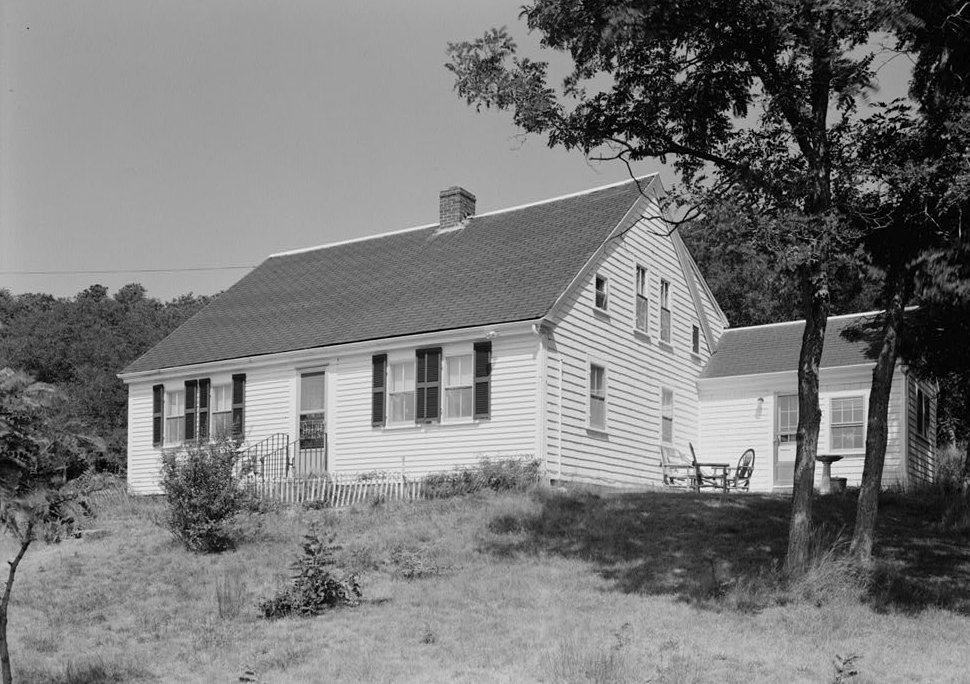
- HABS photo, 1962

- Location within Cape Cod Location within Massachusetts Location within the United States
- Nearest city: North Truro, Massachusetts
- Coordinates: 42°0′35″N 70°3′6″W
- Area: 7 acres (2.8 ha)
- Built: 1890
- NRHP reference No.: 84000550
- Added to NRHP: November 21, 1984

The Jedediah Higgins House is a historic house on Higgins Hollow Road in North Truro, Massachusetts. It is one of the least altered 19th-century Cape style houses in the Cape Cod National Seashore, and an excellent early example of that style. It is a 1 1/2-story post-and-beam house, whose front facade typifies the Cape style: a central doorway flanked by windows on either side. Its interior floor plan is also typical, with two rooms on the south side and one large one to the north, with a central chimney. Interior finishes have also been preserved, including wood flooring, paneling, and wainscoting.

The house was listed on the National Register of Historic Places in 1984.

== See also ==
- National Register of Historic Places listings in Barnstable County, Massachusetts
- National Register of Historic Places listings in Cape Cod National Seashore
