= Ahearn House and Summer House =

Historic house in Massachusetts, United States

- U.S. National Register of Historic Places
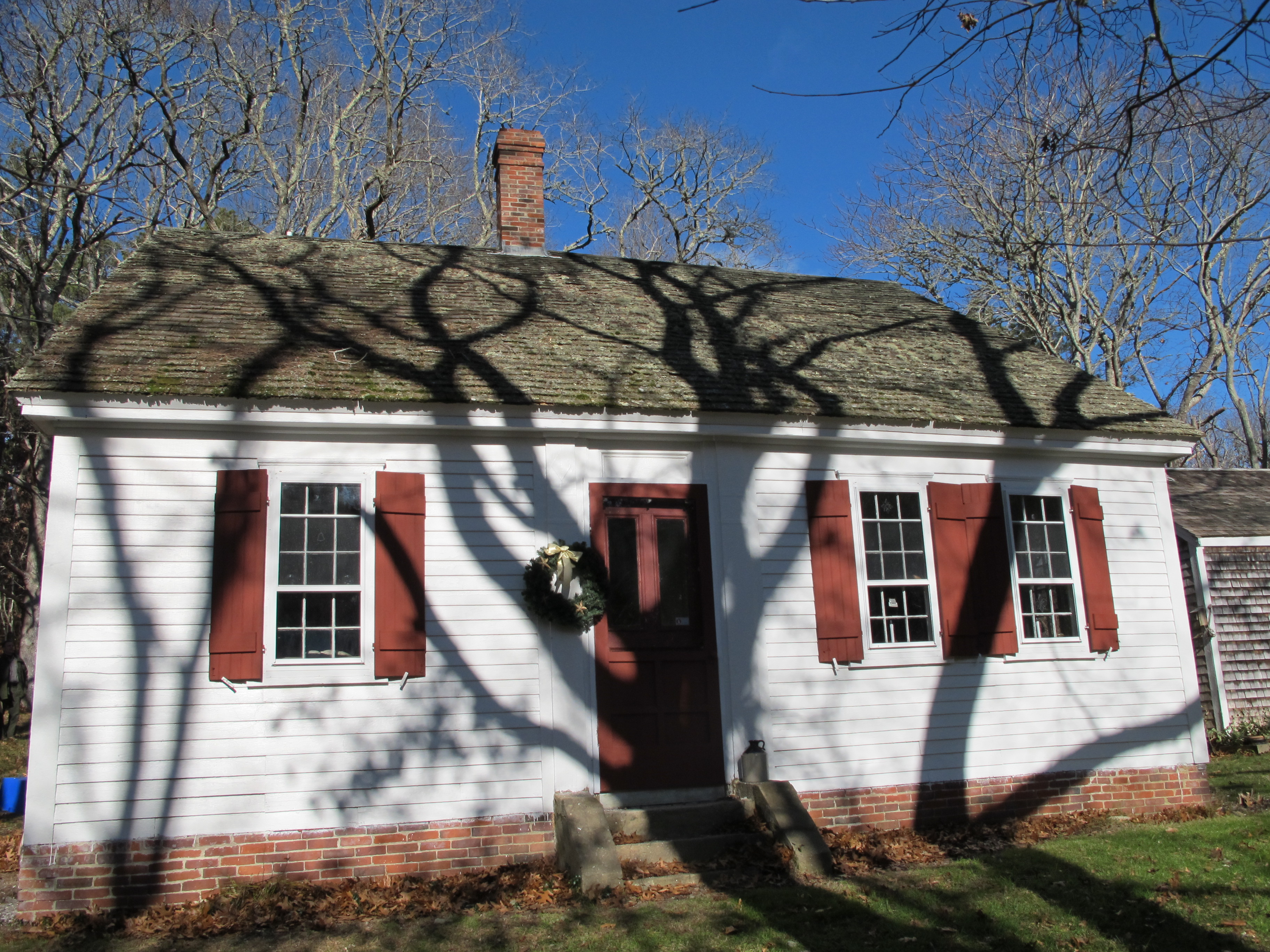
- NPS photo

- Location within Cape Cod Location within Massachusetts Location within the United States
- Location: 450 Pamet Point Rd., Cape Cod National Seashore, Wellfleet, Massachusetts
- Coordinates: 41°57′33″N 70°2′42″W
- Built: c. 1800; 1851
- NRHP reference No.: 84000575
- Added to NRHP: November 21, 1984

The Ahearn House and Summer House are a pair of houses at 450 Pamet Point Road in Wellfleet, Massachusetts. The smaller "summer house" is an early 19th-century cottage, while the main house is a subsequent construction; both are important examples of period architecture in the community. The property was listed on the National Register of Historic Places in 1984.

== Description and history ==
The Ahearn House and Summer House occupy a single parcel of land on the north side of Pamet Point Road, a rural road in Wellfleet's northwest providing access to the Bound Brook area within Cape Cod National Seashore. The main house is a 1 1/2-story timber-frame cottage, with a gable roof, exterior finished in clapboards (front) and shingles (sides), and brick foundation. It has a four-bay front facade, with the main entrance in the second bay from the left, framed by simple pilasters. The summer house is a single-story timber-frame cottage measuring 13 by 18 feet (4.0 m × 5.5 m), with a gabled roof and shingled exterior. Its front facade has a single sash window and entrance, set in the right half of the facade. A small shed-roof addition extends to one side.

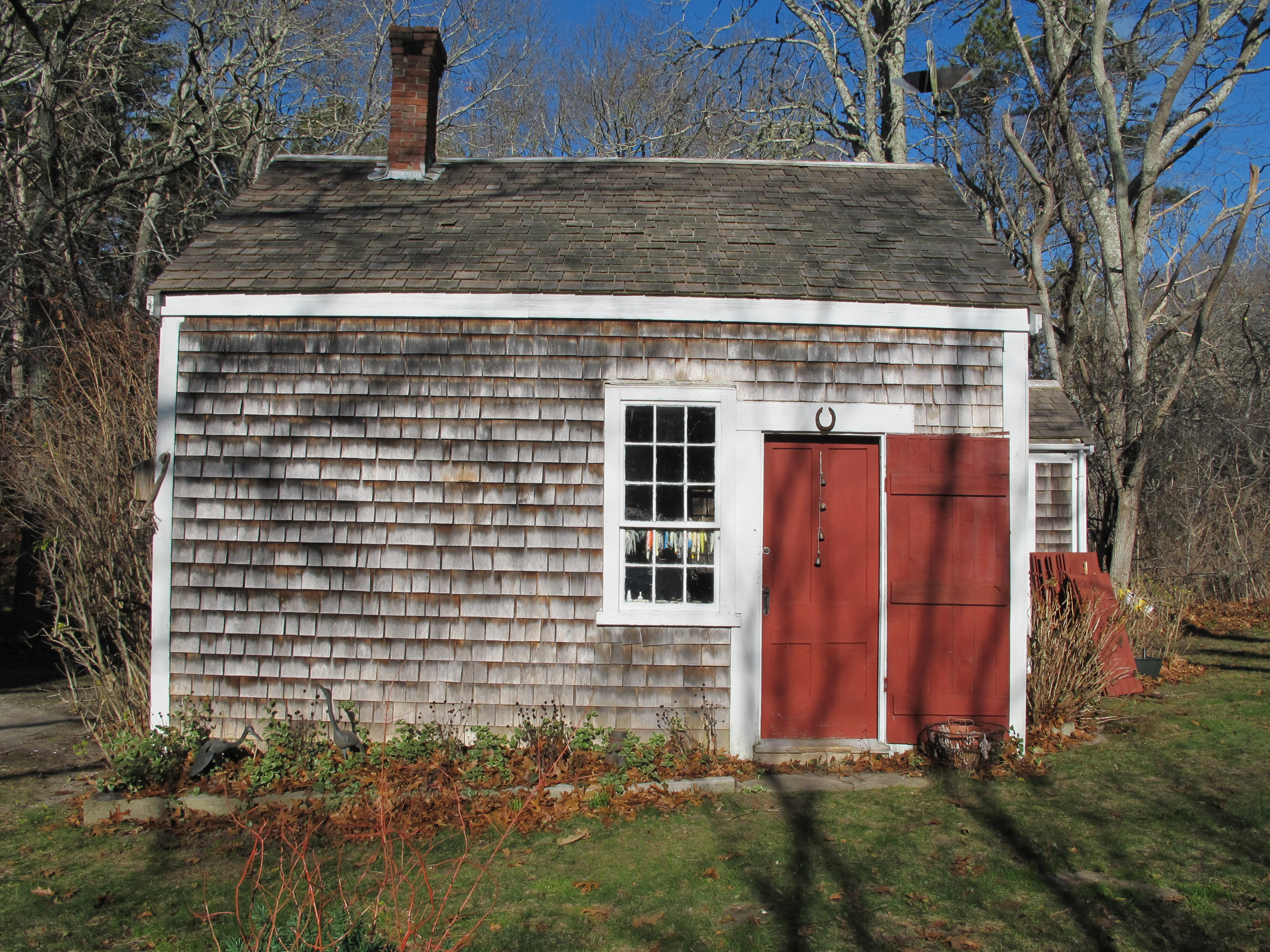
Summer house, NPS photo

The main house was built sometime after 1817, and is known to have been built by 1851, when the property was sold by Daniel Lombard, its probable builder, to Justun Williams. The house remained in the Williams family into the 20th century, when it was owned for many years by Joseph Ahearn. The house has erroneously been associated in a HABS survey with an 18th-century individual, David Curran. The summer house is of clearly older construction, and was probably standing on the property when it was purchased by Williams. It is possible this house was used as toolshed or workshop, as it resembles similar period workshops found elsewhere on Cape Cod.

== See also ==
- National Register of Historic Places listings in Barnstable County, Massachusetts
