= Atwood–Higgins Historic District =

Historic district in Massachusetts, United States

- U.S. National Register of Historic Places
- U.S. Historic district
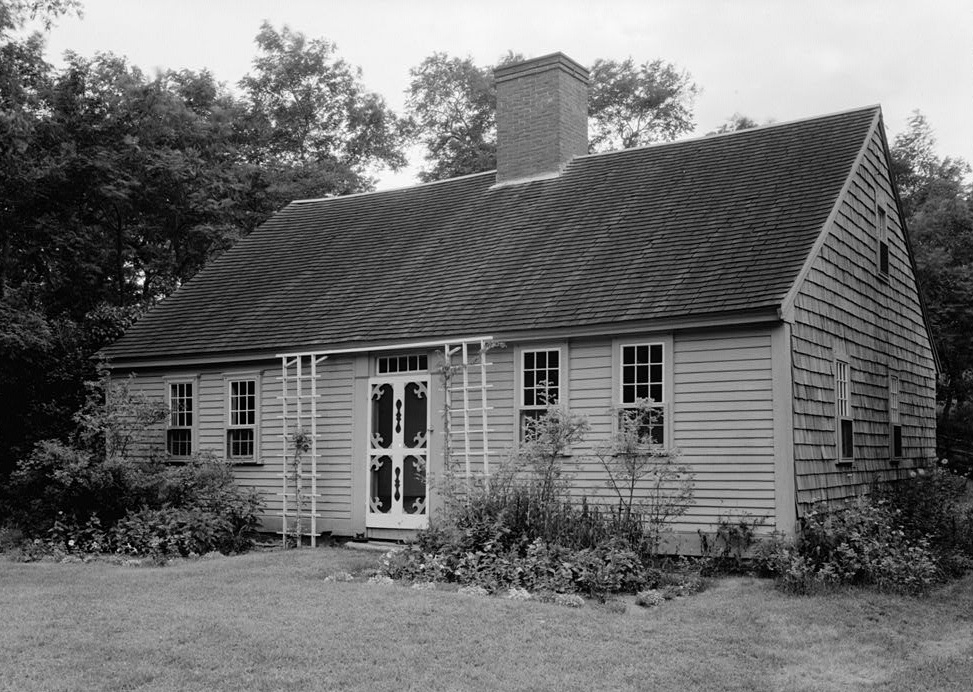
- Photo from a 1959 HABS survey

- Location within Cape Cod
- Nearest city: Wellfleet, Massachusetts
- Coordinates: 41°57′20.52″N 70°3′57.96″W
- Area: 24 acres (97,000 m^{2})
- Built: 1730
- Architectural style: Colonial
- NRHP reference No.: 76000154 (original); 10000508 (increase)

Significant dates
- Added to NRHP: July 30, 1976
- Boundary increase: July 28, 2010

The Atwood–Higgins Historic District encompasses a historic property with deep colonial roots in Cape Cod National Seashore. Located on Bound Brook Island on the west side of Wellfleet, Massachusetts, the centerpiece of the district is the Thomas Atwood House, built c. 1730. The property is emblematic of Cape Cod's colonial origins and its later transformation into a summer resort area. The house was listed on the National Register of Historic Places in 1976; the district was listed in 2010. The property is open for guided tours by the National Park Service on a seasonal basis.

== Description and history ==
The Atwood–Higgins property is located on the east side of Bound Brook Island, which is located in northwestern Wellfleet on the lower portion of Cape Cod. Set on 24 acres (9.7 ha) are a collection of buildings, most of which were built George Higgins in the 20th century. The centerpiece of the property is a typical 1 1/2-story Cape house, whose oldest portion, a "half house" three bays wide, was built in 1730 by Thomas Higgins, a distant ancestor of George Higgins. This property was owned by Higgins descendants until 1805, when it was purchased by Thomas Atwood Sr. The last full-time resident of the house was Atwood's son Thomas Jr. who died in 1873. After sitting vacant for many years, the house was acquired in 1919 by George Higgins and the house was given a painstaking restoration. Higgins originally claimed the house to date to the 17th century; this is not supported by the architecture or documentary record.

George Higgins, in addition to restoring the house, built a variety of outbuildings, giving the property a rustic rural feel. The buildings he built include a barn, wellhouse, guest house, and country store, all essentially in a Colonial Revival interpretation of a colonial Cape Cod farmstead. This job was made easier when the town built an improved Bound Brook Island Road, connecting the island to the mainland. Higgins and his neighbors on the island made an agreement to limit development on the island to historically compatible alterations and improvements. Higgins gave the property to the National Park Service when the Cape Cod National Seashore was created in 1961.

The house was listed on the National Register of Historic Places in 1976. In 2010, the listing was greatly expanded to include the 20th-century buildings and to recognize the work of George Higgins. The house is seasonally open to tours offered by the Park Service.

== See also ==
- List of the oldest buildings in Massachusetts
- National Register of Historic Places listings in Barnstable County, Massachusetts
- National Register of Historic Places listings in Cape Cod National Seashore
