= Pine Grove Cemetery (Truro, Massachusetts) =

Historic cemetery in Barnstable County, Massachusetts

- U.S. National Register of Historic Places
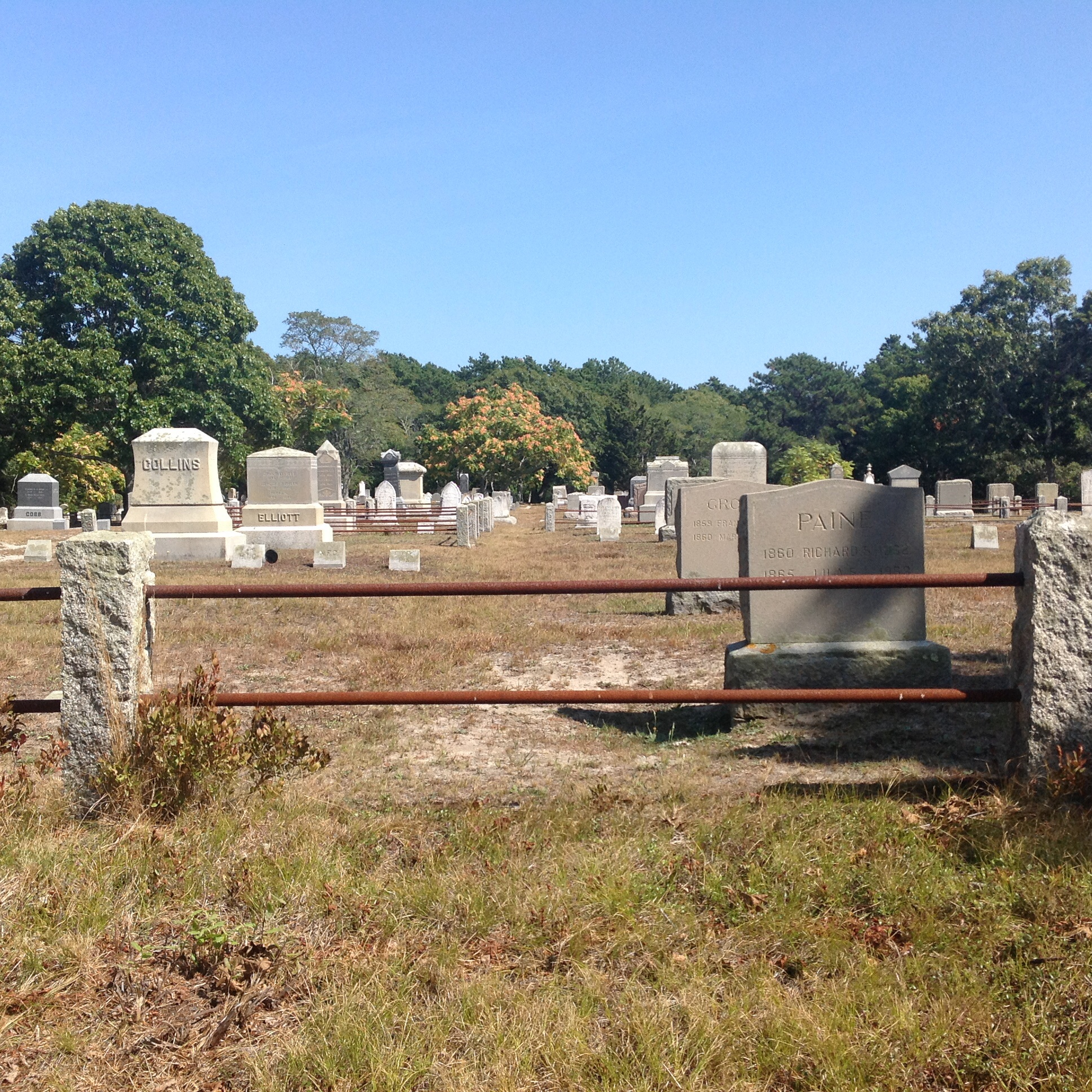

- Location within Cape Cod Location within Massachusetts Location within the United States
- Location: Truro, Massachusetts
- Coordinates: 41°58′34″N 70°03′34″W
- Area: 2.153 acres (0.871 ha)
- NRHP reference No.: 13000096
- Added to NRHP: March 20, 2013

The Pine Grove Cemetery is the second oldest cemetery in Truro, Massachusetts. The cemetery was established in 1799; it is located on Cemetery Road in a remote area of the Cape Cod National Seashore. Originally established by Truro's Methodists, the cemetery was located near a church which has not survived. The cemetery is surrounded by a fence made of granite posts connected by iron rails. Access to its interior is via a gravel roadway that roughly bisects the property from east to west; there is also a grassy path to a pedestrian gate on the south side. Burials in the cemetery date from 1799 to the recent past.

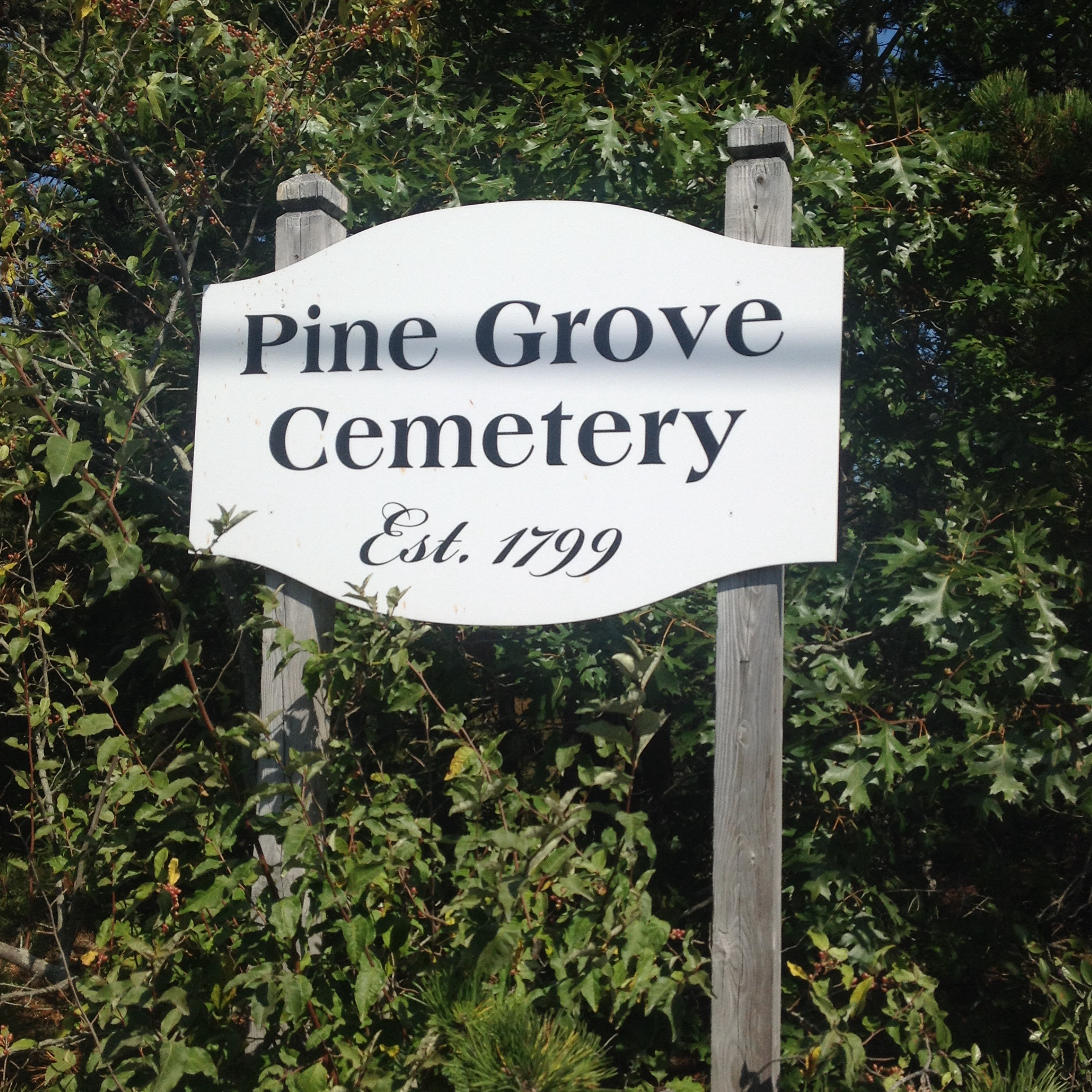
The cemetery's sign

The cemetery was added to the National Register of Historic Places in 2013.

== See also ==
- National Register of Historic Places listings in Barnstable County, Massachusetts
