= Nauset Light =

Lighthouse in Eastham, Massachusetts

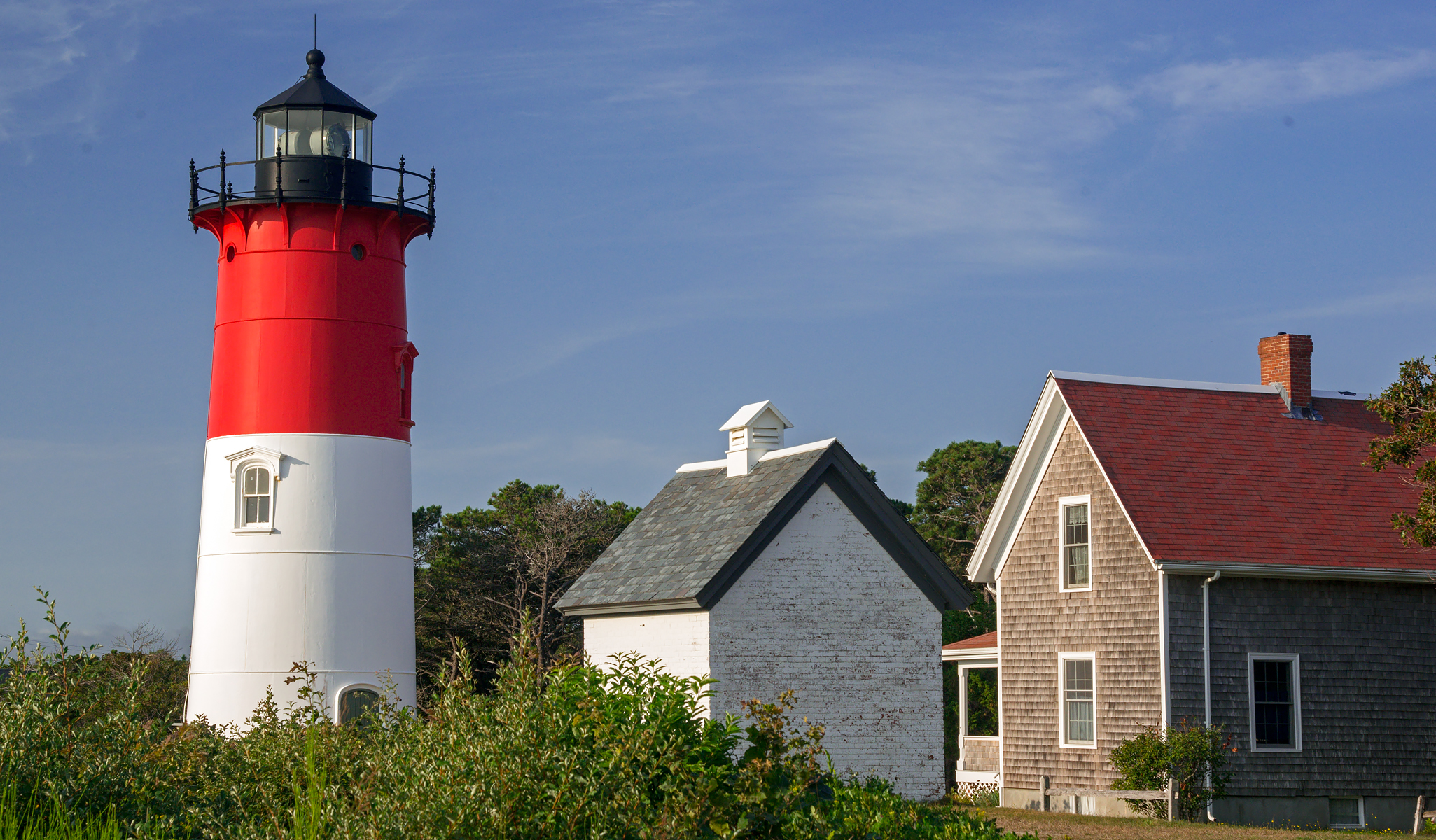
- Nauset Light, oil house and lightkeeper's home
- Location: Nauset Beach, Eastham, Massachusetts
- Coordinates: 41°51′36.5″N 69°57′10.6″W

Tower
- Constructed: 1877
- Foundation: Concrete
- Construction: Cast iron with brick lining
- Automated: 1955
- Height: 48 feet (15 m)
- Shape: Conical
- Markings: Upper red, lower white with black lantern
- Heritage: National Register of Historic Places listed place
- Fog signal: none

Light
- First lit: 1877 (current tower in Chatham); 1923 (current tower here)
- Deactivated: 1996-97 now a private aid
- Focal height: 120 feet (37 m)
- Lens: 4th order Fresnel lens (original), Carlisle & Finch DCB-224 (current)
- Range: White 24 nautical miles (44 km; 28 mi), Red 20 nautical miles (37 km; 23 mi)
- Characteristic: Alt white and red 10s
- Nauset Beach Light
- U.S. National Register of Historic Places
- Area: 1 acre (0.40 ha)
- Built: 1875
- Architectural style: Gothic Revival
- MPS: Lighthouses of Massachusetts TR
- NRHP reference No.: 87001484
- Added to NRHP: June 15, 1987

Nauset Light, officially Nauset Beach Light, is a restored lighthouse on the Cape Cod National Seashore near Eastham, Massachusetts, erected in 1923 using the 1877 tower that was moved here from the Chatham Light. It is listed on the National Register of Historic Places. The tower is a cast-iron plate shell lined with brick and stands 48 feet (15 m) high. The adjacent oil house (where fuel was stored in the early days) is made of brick and has also been restored. Fully automated, the beacon is a private aid to navigation. Tours of the tower and oil house are available in summer from the Nauset Light Preservation Society which operates, maintains and interprets the site. The tower is located adjacent to Nauset Light Beach.

== History ==
The tower that eventually became Nauset Light was constructed in 1877 as one of two towers in Chatham. It was moved to Eastham in 1923 to replace the Three Sisters of Nauset, three small wood lighthouses that had been decommissioned. They have since been relocated to a small field about 1,000 feet (300 m) west of the Nauset Light. Nauset Light was originally all white, but in the 1940s, the top section of the tower was painted red, creating the iconic appearance.

The Light was automated and the Keeper's house was sold in 1955. The original fourth-order Fresnel lens was removed in 1981 and replaced with aerobeacons. The lens is on display in the Salt Pond Visitor Center of the Cape Cod National Seashore. In December 2008, the old-style bulbs in the aerobeacons were replaced with 400 watt metal halide bulbs.

Due to coastal erosion, by the early 1990s Nauset Light was less than 50 feet (15 m) from the edge of the 70-foot (21 m) cliff on which it stood. In 1993, the Coast Guard proposed decommissioning the light. Following a great public outcry, the non-profit Nauset Light Preservation Society was formed and funded, and in 1995, it leased the lighthouse from the Coast Guard. The Society arranged for both the tower and the brick oil house to be relocated, in November 1996, to a location 336 feet (102 m) west of its original position – which by then was only 37 feet (11 m) from the cliff's edge. The move was accomplished successfully by International Chimney Corporation, which had moved the larger Highland Light a similar distance earlier that year, with assistance from Expert Movers and a consultant, Pete Friesen.

The light was again lit on May 10, 1997. During the ceremony at that time, the Coast Guard transferred ownership of the lighthouse to the National Park Service, but the operation was assumed by the Nauset Light Preservation Society.

In 1998, Mary Daubenspeck, who had owned the Keeper's House (and Oil House) privately since 1982 (having purchased both from Miriam Rowell, who with her husband Lucien had become the first private residential owners in 1955), elected not to move the Keeper's House to a privately owned lot distant from the Lighthouse, but rather agreed to donate it to the National Park Service in the interest of posterity and so as to preserve the Nauset Light landmark's authenticity -- while retaining the right to occupy it for 25 years. It was agreed that the house would be moved from its original location, then only 23 feet (7 m) from the edge of the cliff, to a new location near the relocated tower. The move was completed in October 1998 by Gary Sylvester's Building Movers & Excavators. Mary Daubenspeck had previously donated the Oil House in 1996 so that it could be moved at the same time as the Lighthouse.

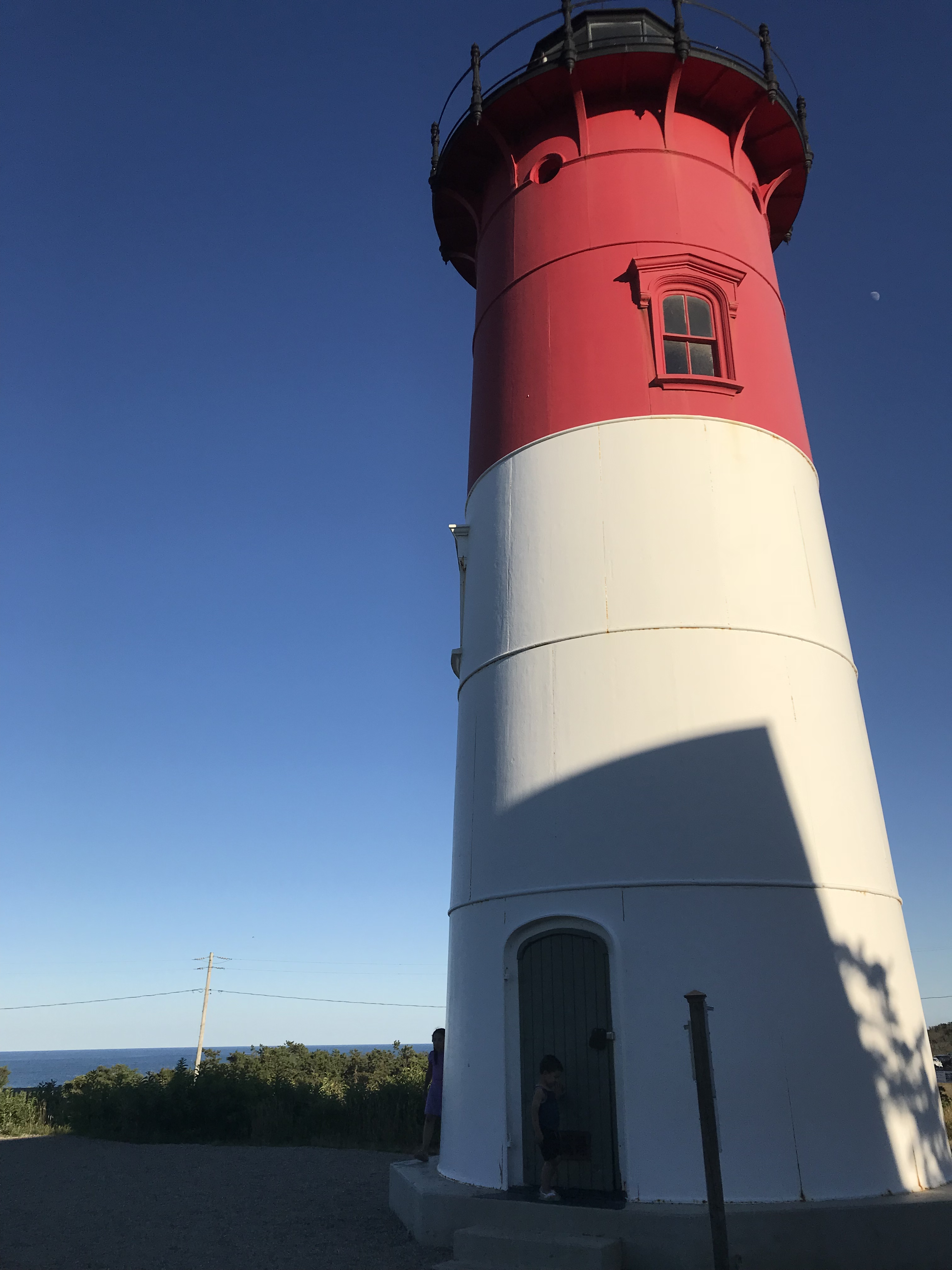
Full Nauset Lighthouse

=== Lighthouse keepers ===
The following individuals were keepers of this light after the tower was moved to Eastham from the Chatham Light in 1923.

- George I. Herbolt (1923–1932)
- John Poyner (1932)
- Allison G. Haskins (1932–1938)
- Fred S. Vidler (1938–1942)
- Eugene L. Coleman (1942–1950 or 1952, depending on the source)

=== Current status ===
Since May 24, 2004, when the Nauset Light Preservation Society signed a partnership agreement with the National Park Service (Cape Cod National Seashore), the Service has operated the light as a private aid to navigation while the Society has covered all expenses related to the site by selling memberships and through donations. Visitors can tour the light and the oil house on Sundays from May to late October and also on Wednesdays during July and August.

The Lighthouse serves as the logo for Cape Cod Potato Chips. It appears on a "Cape Cod & Islands" special license plate which was introduced in 1996 and generates revenue for local counties and development organizations. It was added to the National Register of Historic Places in 1987 as Nauset Beach Light.

The Keeper's House has been turned back over to public operation by the Daubenspeck Family as of April 2024, at the expiration of the term of their limited use permit. The history of the Keeper's House has been recorded in the two books authored by Mary E. Daubenspeck, the second (posthumously) with her brother, Timothy H. Daubenspeck, who served as Keeper's House manager for the Daubenspeck family from 2001 to 2024, after Mary died in 2001. The books are entitled; "NAUSET LIGHT: A Personal History" (Mary E Daubenspeck, 1995) and "NAUSET LIGHT: A Personal Legacy" (Mary E Daubenspeck and Timothy H Daubenspeck, 2024).

== See also ==
- National Register of Historic Places listings in Barnstable County, Massachusetts
