= Francis B. Higgins House =

Historic house in South Carolina, United States

- U.S. National Register of Historic Places
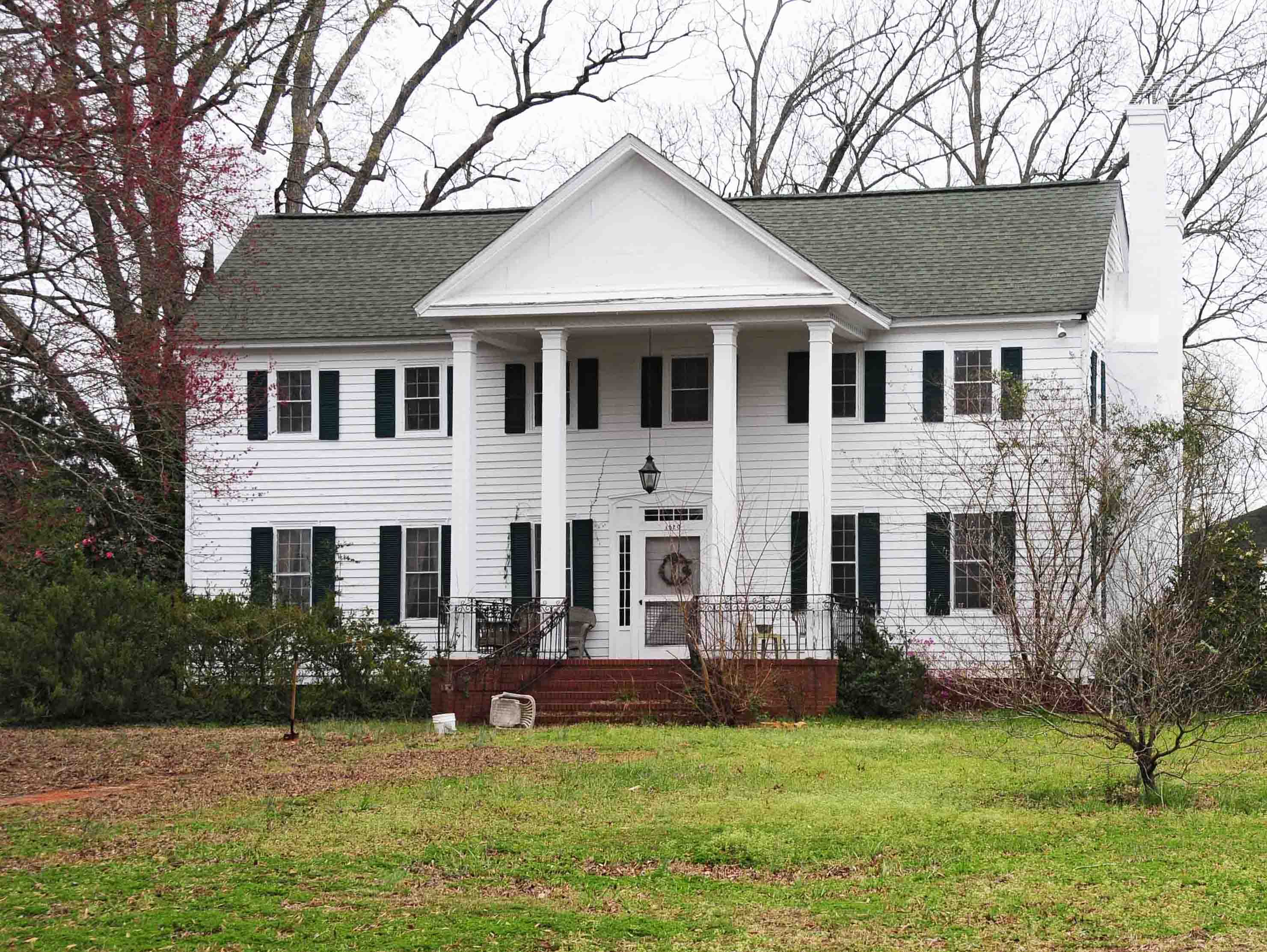
- Francis B. Higgins House, March 2012

- Location within South Carolina Location within the United States
- Location: 1520 Boundary St., Newberry, South Carolina
- Coordinates: 34°16′24″N 81°36′57″W
- Area: 1.6 acres (0.65 ha)
- Built: c. 1820
- Architectural style: Greek Revival, Federal
- MPS: Newberry MRA
- NRHP reference No.: 80003682
- Added to NRHP: November 26, 1980

Francis B. Higgins House, also known as the Caldwell-Higgins House, is a historic home located at Newberry, Newberry County, South Carolina. It was built about 1820, and is a two-story weatherboarded residence with Federal and Greek Revival style details. The front facade features a projecting central portico. It was built by Francis B. Higgins, Newberry attorney, planter, and county commissioner in equity, and is the oldest documented dwelling in Newberry.

It was listed on the National Register of Historic Places in 1980.
