= Old Village Historic District (Chatham, Massachusetts) =

Historic district in Massachusetts, United States

- U.S. National Register of Historic Places
- U.S. Historic district
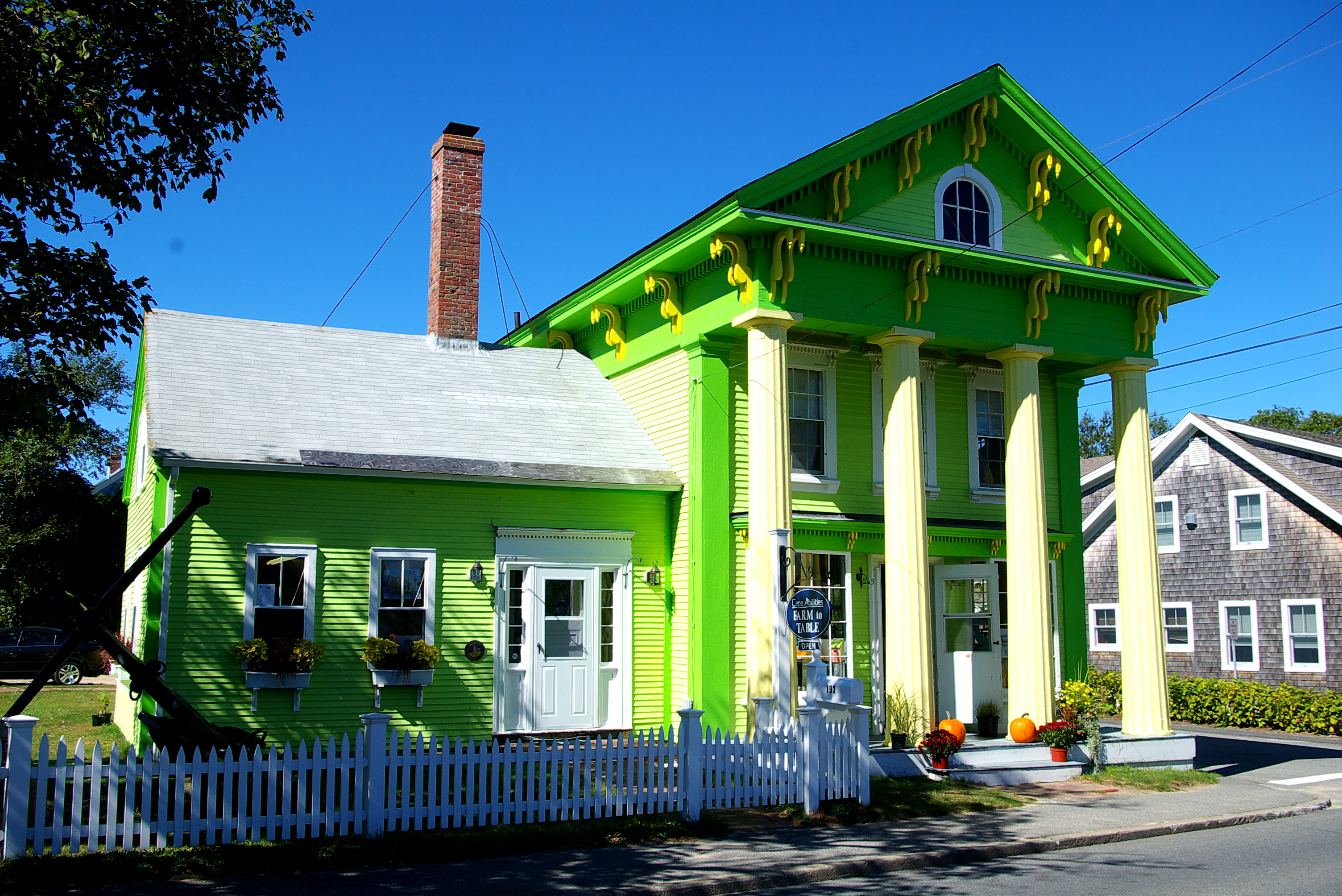

- Location within Cape Cod Location within Massachusetts Location within the United States
- Location: Chatham, Massachusetts
- Coordinates: 41°40′29″N 69°57′6″W
- Area: 95 acres (38 ha)
- Architectural style: Georgian, Federal
- NRHP reference No.: 01001406
- Added to NRHP: December 17, 2001

The Old Village Historic District is predominantly residential historic district encompassing the old village center of Chatham, Massachusetts. The Old Village occupies the southeast corner of the town where it is framed by Main Street and Holway Street (north), Bridge Street and Bearse's Lane (south), Chatham Harbor (east) and Mill Pond and Little Mill Pond (west). The houses of the district represent a cross section of architectural development in the town, with houses dating from c. 1730 to the 20th century. The district also includes the Chatham Light, a church, and a small number of commercial buildings.

The district was listed on the National Register of Historic Places in 2001.

== See also ==
- National Register of Historic Places listings in Barnstable County, Massachusetts
