= E.H. Higgins House =

- E. H. Higgins House
- U.S. National Register of Historic Places
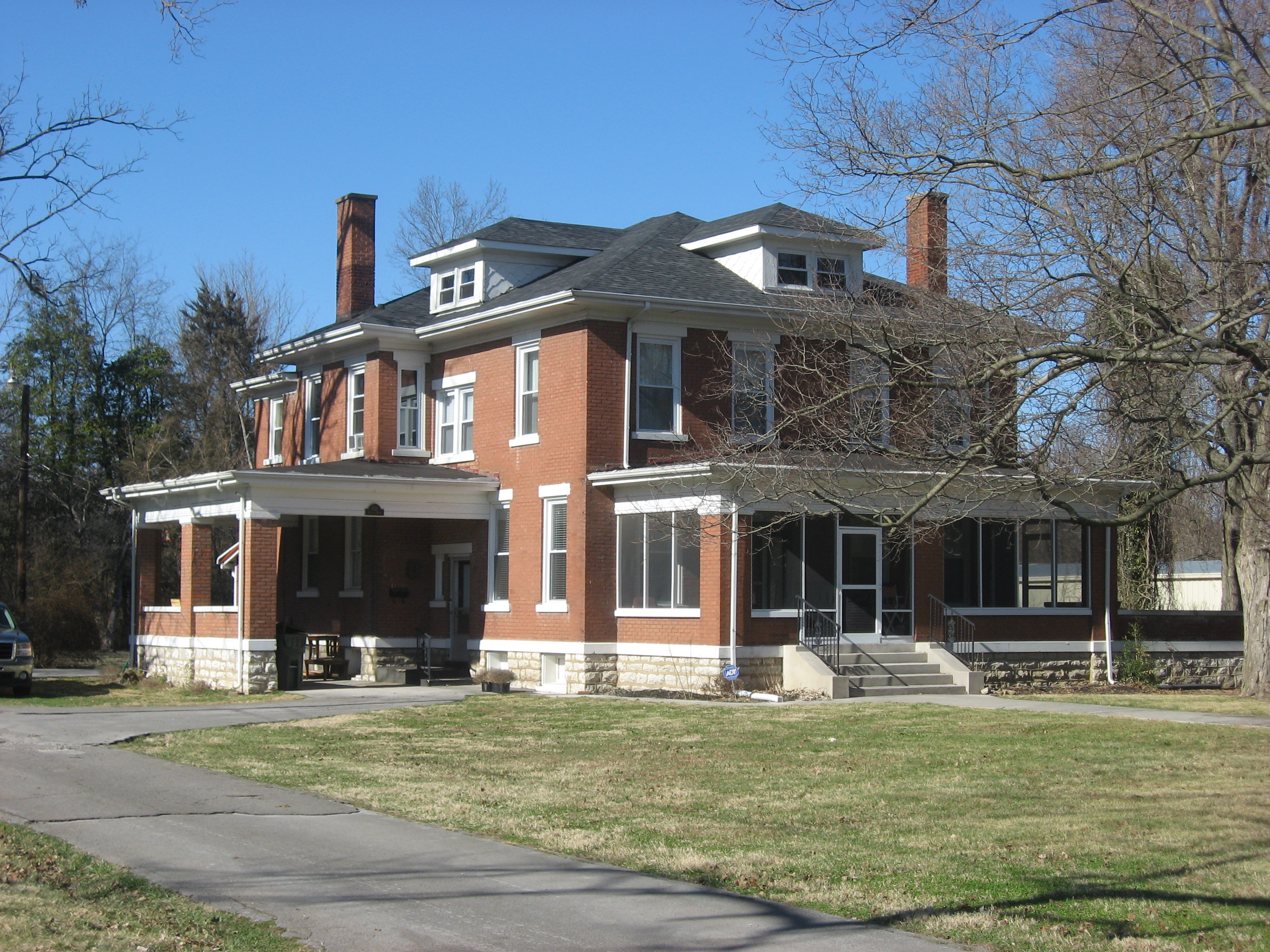

- Location within Kentucky Location within the United States
- Location: 1530 E. 7th St., Hopkinsville, Kentucky
- Coordinates: 36°51′55″N 87°28′08″W
- Area: 1.7 acres (0.69 ha)
- Built: 1920
- Architectural style: American Four Square
- MPS: Christian County MRA
- NRHP reference No.: 84001403
- Added to NRHP: January 3, 1984

The E. H. Higgins House, at 1530 E. 7th St. in Hopkinsville, Kentucky, is an American Four Square house built in 1920. It was listed on the National Register of Historic Places in 1984.

It was deemed to be a "fine example of the American Four-square style". It is a two-and-a-half-story house built upon a stone foundation. It has a hipped roof with a central dormer and it has a one-story porte-cochere.
