= Chatham Light =

Lighthouse in Chatham, Massachusetts, US

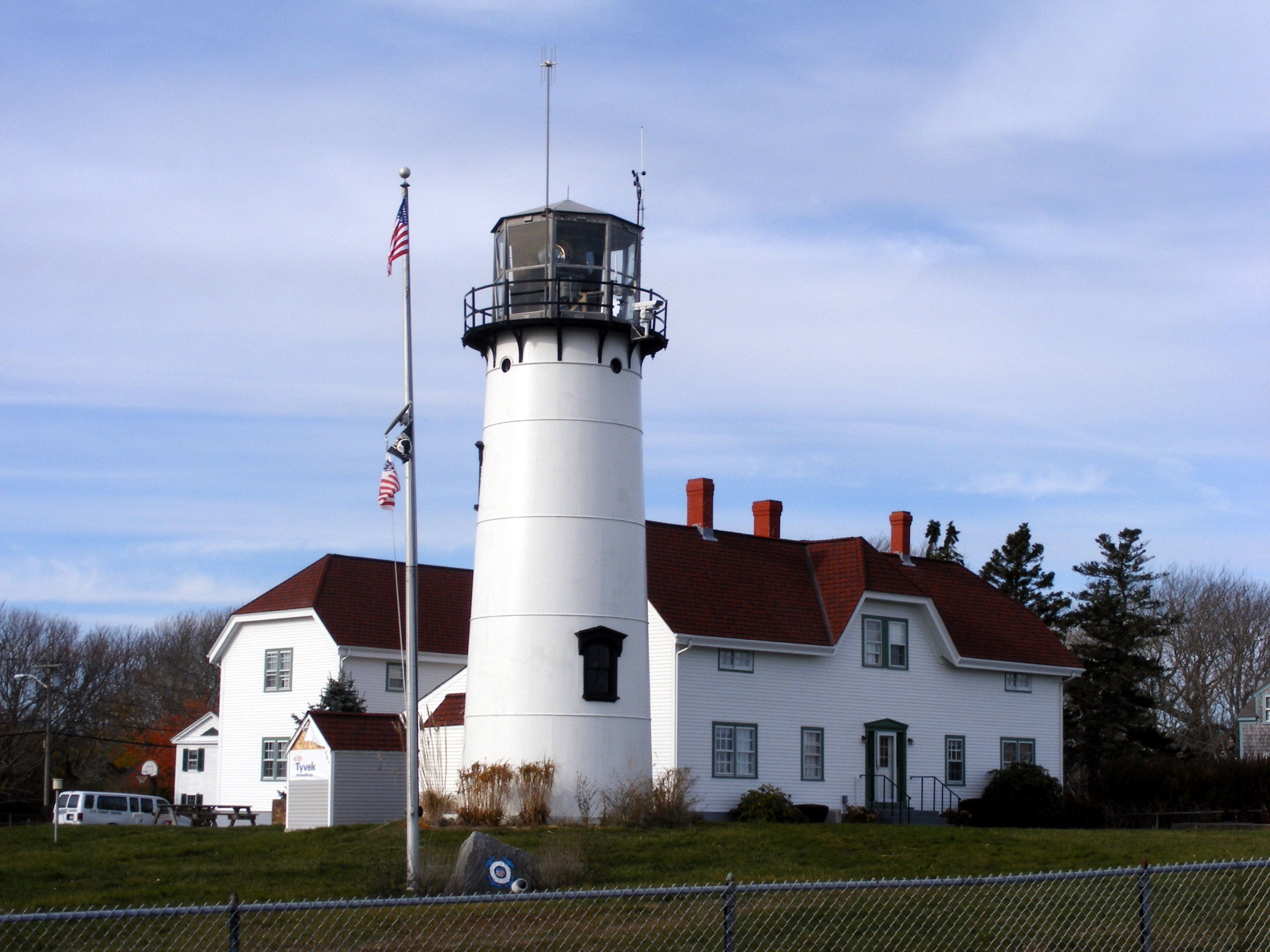
- Chatham Light and Coast Guard Station (2007)
- Location: Chatham, Massachusetts
- Coordinates: 41°40′16.704″N 69°57′.554″W

Tower
- Constructed: 1808
- Foundation: Concrete
- Construction: Cast iron plate with brick lining
- Automated: 1982
- Height: 14.5 m (48 ft)
- Shape: Conical
- Markings: White with gray lantern
- Heritage: National Register of Historic Places listed place
- Fog signal: none

Light
- First lit: 1877 (current structure)
- Focal height: 80 feet (24 m)
- Lens: 4th order Fresnel lens (original), Carlisle & Finch DCB-224 (current)
- Range: 24 nautical miles (44 km; 28 mi)
- Characteristic: Fl (2) W 10s, lighted continuously
- Chatham Light Station
- U.S. National Register of Historic Places
- U.S. Historic district – Contributing property
- Location: Main St., Chatham, Massachusetts
- Area: 2 acres (0.81 ha)
- Built: 1877
- Part of: Old Village Historic District (ID01001406)
- MPS: Lighthouses of Massachusetts TR
- NRHP reference No.: 87001501

Significant dates
- Added to NRHP: June 15, 1987
- Designated CP: December 17, 2001

Chatham Lighthouse, known as Twin Lights prior to 1923, is a lighthouse in Chatham, Massachusetts, near the "elbow" of Cape Cod. The original station, close to the shore, was built in 1808 with two wooden towers, which were both replaced in 1841. In 1877, two new towers, made of cast iron rings, replaced those. One of the towers was moved to the Eastham area, where it became known as Nauset Light in 1923.

== History ==
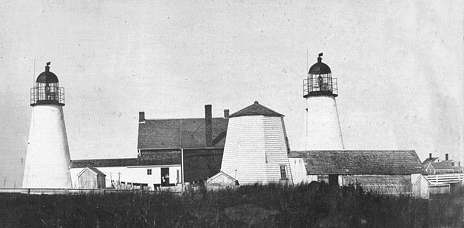
The 1841 brick towers

The station was established in 1808; it was the second light station on Cape Cod. To distinguish it from Highland Light, the first Cape Cod light, and to act as a range, twin octagonal 40-foot (12 m) wooden towers were built. They were on skids so that they could be moved to keep them in line with the entrance channel as it shifted. Samuel Nye was appointed as the first Keeper of the Chatham Lights by President Jefferson on October 7, 1808.

The light had an interesting history afterwards.

- 1841 The wood octagonal towers are replaced with two 40-foot (12 m) brick towers
- 1857 Fourth order Fresnel lenses are installed, fueled by lard oil
- 1877 New twin towers of brick, lined with cast iron, and a keeper's dwelling are built further from the shore, because of erosion concerns
- 1893 A brick oil house is added
- 1923 Northern tower of the pair is moved roughly 12 miles (19 km) north to become Nauset Light
- 1939 Chatham Light, kerosene fueled since 1882, and rotated via a clockwork drive, is converted to electricity; the light remains active during WWII
- 1969 The Fresnel lens is moved to Atwood House Museum, replaced with a Carlisle & Finch rotating light generating over 2.8 million candlepower
- 1982 Automated
- 1983 Aerobeacons installed in the lantern room
- 1993 New DCB-224 aerobeacons are installed

Chatham Light was added to the National Register of Historic Places as Chatham Light Station on June 15, 1987, reference number 87001501.

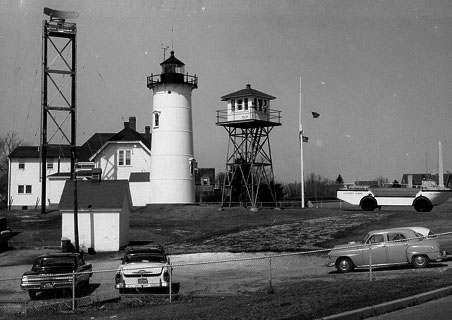
The remaining 1877 tower with its original lantern. Note the LARC-V to the right.

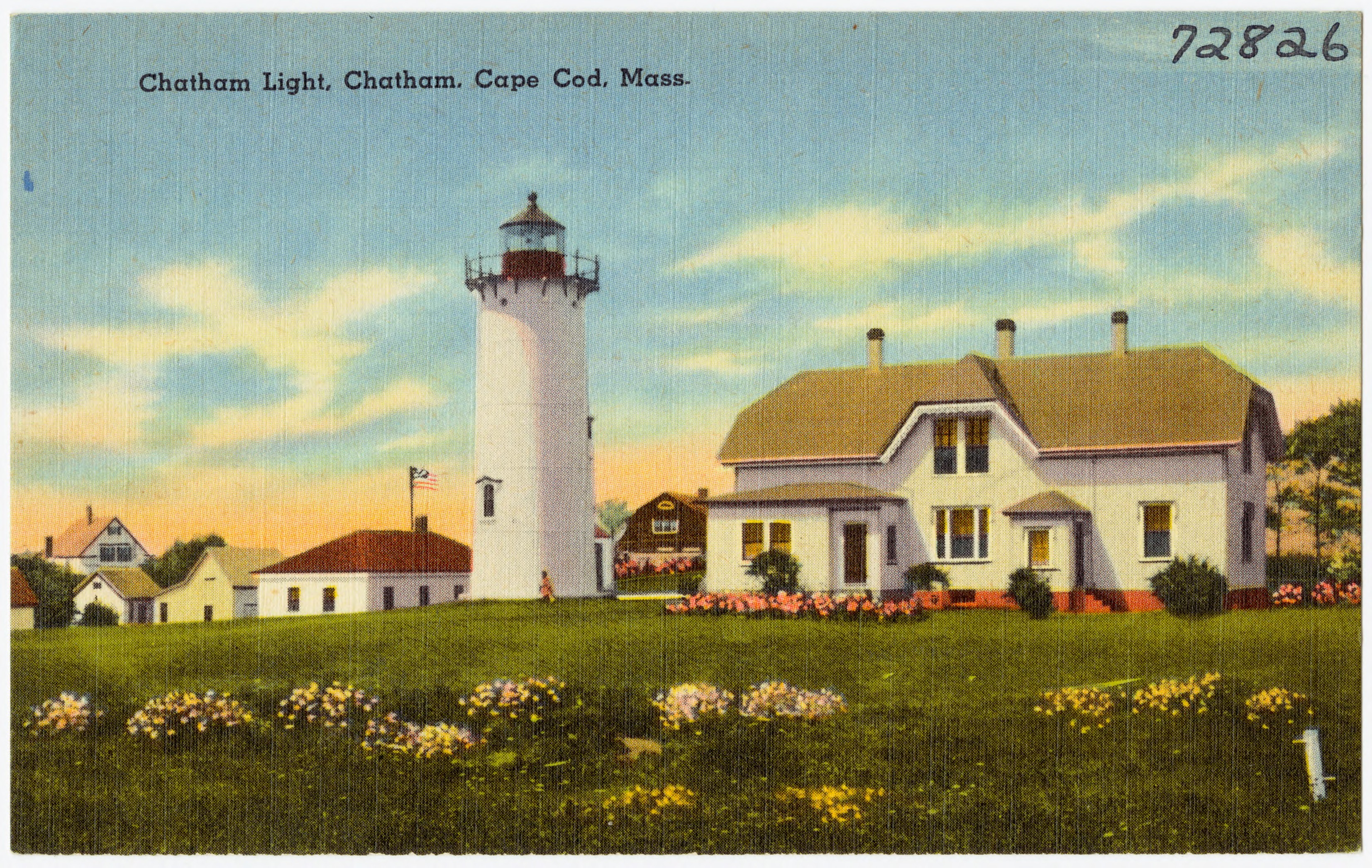
Postcard, circa 1940s

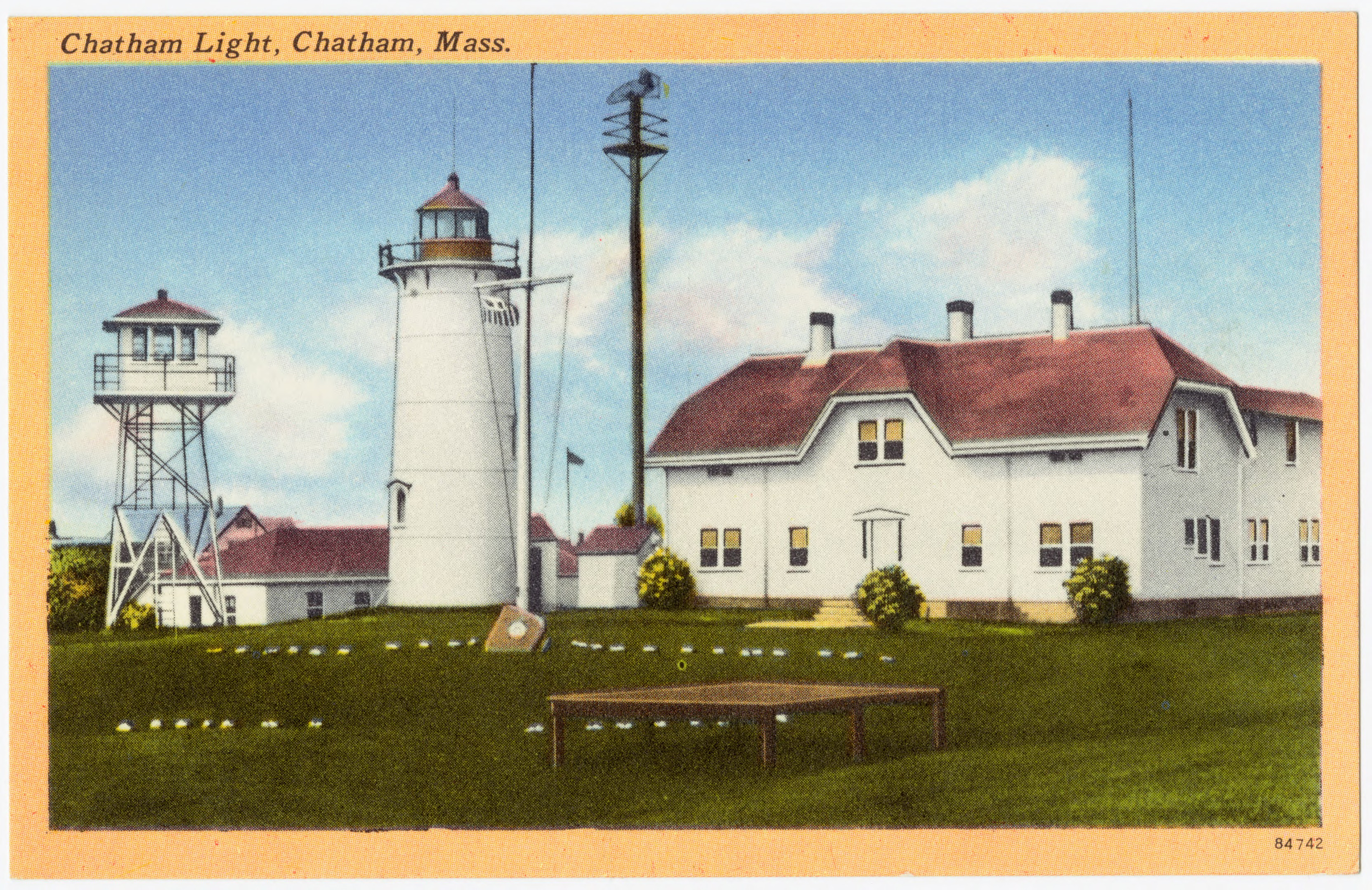
Postcard, circa 1960s

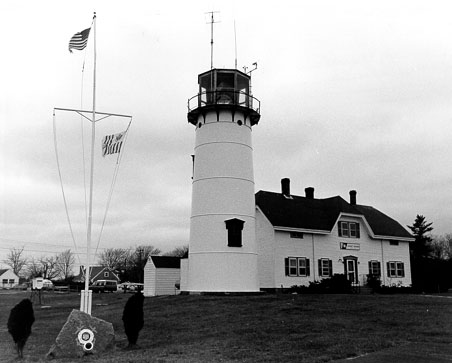
The 1877 tower with the replacement (1969) lantern

=== Light keepers ===
The following individuals were the principal light keepers over the years.

- Samuel Nye (1808 – 1813)
- Joseph Loveland (1813 – at least 1833)
- Samuel Stinson (at least 1835 – 1839)
- Lot Norton (1839 – 1841)
- Collins Howes (1841 – 1845)
- Simeon Nickerson (1845 – 1848)
- Angeline M. Nickerson (1848 – 1862)
- Charles H. Smith (1862 – 1872)
- Josiah Hardy Jr. (1872 – 1899)
- Charles H. Hammond (1899 – 1907)
- James T. Allison (1907 – 1928)
- George F. Woodman Jr. (1928 – 1940)
- George T. Gustavus (1940 – 1945).

=== Current status ===
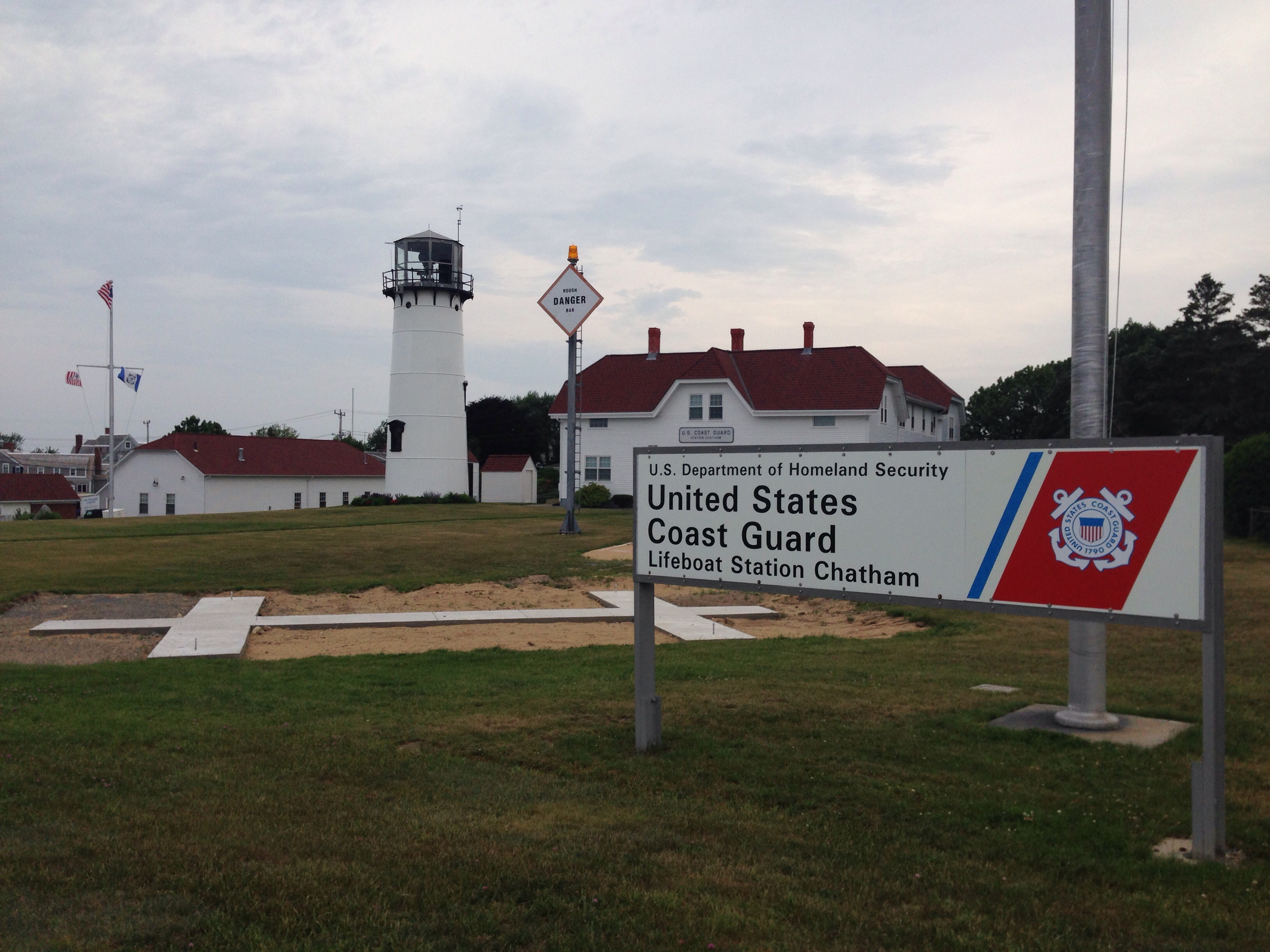
Chatham Light in 2015

Today, the former keeper's house is an active U.S. Coast Guard station, and on-duty personnel living quarters. Search and Rescue, maritime law enforcement, and Homeland Security missions are carried out here. Flotilla 11-01 of the U.S. Coast Guard Auxiliary operates from this station.

== In popular culture ==
The Chatham Lighthouse is featured in the film The Finest Hours depicting the US Coast Guard's rescue of the SS Pendleton in 1952 off the coast of Chatham. All four of the Coast Guard crew received the Coast Guard's Gold Lifesaving Medal.

== See also ==
- National Register of Historic Places listings in Barnstable County, Massachusetts
