= Coast Guard Beach (Eastham, Massachusetts) =

Beach in Massachusetts, United States

- Beach
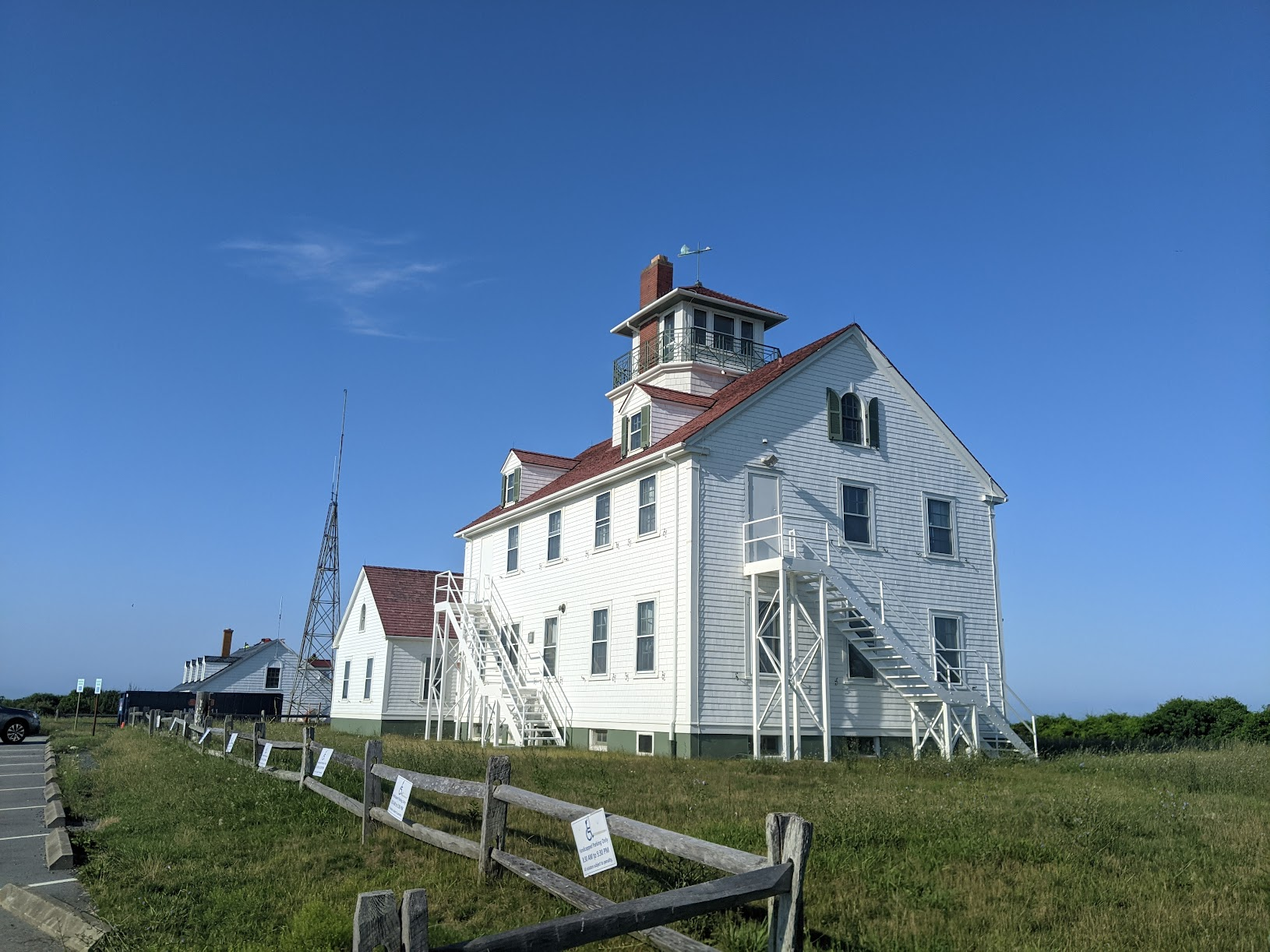
- The historic Coast Guard headquarters in 2021
- Interactive map of Coast Guard Beach
- Coordinates: 41°50′35″N 69°56′43″W
- Location: Ocean View Drive; Eastham, Massachusetts
- Part of: Cape Cod National Seashore

Coast Guard Beach is part of the Cape Cod National Seashore in Eastham, Massachusetts. From mid-June to Labor Day, the parking area at this location is closed to all but park staff and visitors who are disabled, and access is provided by shuttle bus from the Little Creek parking area (across from the Doane Area). Although the parking lot at Coast Guard Beach is open the remainder of the year, parking is limited. There are seasonal restrooms and a wheelchair-accessible rampway to the beach.

Coast Guard Beach is popular among locals and tourists for surfing and boogie boarding. It is one of five Cape Cod National Seashore beaches that are on the ocean side of the Cape, generally providing a better surf than beaches on the bay side. Low tide exposes a fairly flat stretch of beach, making it also popular for skimboarding.

== History ==
=== The Outer Beach ===
The outer beach, or "backside," of Cape Cod has been the notorious graveyard for more than 3,000 ships since the wreck of the Sparrowhawk in 1626. The high cost in lives and property demanded by the sands of Cape Cod, led to the establishment of the Massachusetts Humane Society in 1786, the first organization in the nation devoted to the rescue and assistance of shipwrecked mariners. The Humane Society established shelter huts along the coast; later, it built lifeboat stations where surfboats, line-throwing guns, and other lifesaving gear were stored for the use of volunteer crews in times of emergency.

In 1848, the Congress appropriated funds for the first time to construct, equip and maintain similar stations in New Jersey. From 1848 until 1872, Congress provided the money to build more stations along the eastern seaboard and the Great Lakes. The stations in Massachusetts continued to be administered by the Massachusetts Humane Society, but the federal government subsidized its operation. The continued frequent loss of life along the nation's shores led Congress, in 1871–1872, to reorganize the Life Saving Service, a place it on a full-time professional basis. The construction and manning of nine stations on the "backside" of Cape Cod was provided for in the Federal budget of 1871.

One of the original nine stations was constructed at Nauset. It was located about 350 yards southeast of the present building. Shoreline erosion compelled the construction of a new station. The old station remained in service until 1937, when it was replaced by the present structure. The present building was in service as a Coast Guard Station until 1958. The first headquarters of the Cape Cod National Seashore opened in this building in 1961.

=== The Outermost House ===
About two miles south, on the outer beach, stood the cottage where author Henry Beston lived while gathering the material for his book, The Outermost House, published in 1928. The book describes life on the outer beach during all four seasons.

The house was designed by Henry Beston in 1925. He took meticulous care with every detail because he intended his house to sit on the dune solid as a good ship. The little house, called the Fo'c'sle by Henry Beston, was 21 ft. long by 16 ft. wide and consisted of two rooms, a main room and a bedroom. There were windows on all four sides, giving wonderful views of the entire area, and a little porch along the front.

Henry Beston gave the property to the Massachusetts Audubon Society in 1959. It was occupied in summer by Audubon members who cherished their solitude as much as did Henry Beston.

Unfortunately, the sea claimed the cottage during a ferocious northeasterly storm in the winter of 1978.

=== The Great Storm of 1978 ===
It was more than people expected, and yet Cape Cod was lucky. For despite all the damage, the worst of the storm lay to the west, where a huge area of Massachusetts and neighboring states was buried under two-to four feet of snow.

On the Cape, the winds increased on Monday, until they peaked at 6 p.m., clocking 92 miles per hour at Chatham. Coastline damage was inevitable. Wind was the destructive element Monday, but, beginning at midnight, a high tide on a new moon combined with the storm-generated waves to produce a tide some 14.5 feet above mean low water. The storm waves on this high tide pounded the Great Beach with as much impact and overwash as any storm in this century. Storm waves virtually obliterated the parking lot and changing room complex at Coast Guard Beach. Waves repeatedly swept over the most of Nauset Spit as well. In the process, four houses were destroyed, including The Outermost House, made famous by Henry Beston's book of the same name. Most of the wind-built dunes of Nauset Spit were reduced to low mounds. Now, they barely rose high enough above high tide to separate Nauset Marsh from the sea.

This process of overwash is normal—in the geologic sense. It is the way a spit retreats when it is attached to a retreating coastline. In effect, the sand that comprises the spit is turned over upon itself. The spit retains its shape, and in this case, the marsh behind it remains protected and continues to be an incredibly rich, productive marine nursery for such animals as flounder, striped bass, scallops and quahogs. The concern now is to see the beach recover sufficiently to protect Nauset Marsh. For, without the spit, the marsh would no longer exist. This recovery process involves the build-up of dunes behind the beach by the wind, and the stabilization of these dunes by the growth of beach grass.

In the 1980s, the National Park Service built a new parking lot well away from the beach, to allow the natural give-and-take processes of erosion to continue in this area.
