= Cape Cod National Seashore =

Protected area on Cape Cod, Massachusetts

- IUCN category V (protected landscape/seascape)
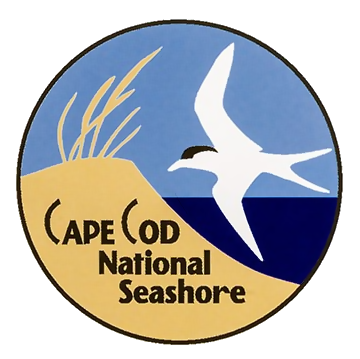
- Official logo

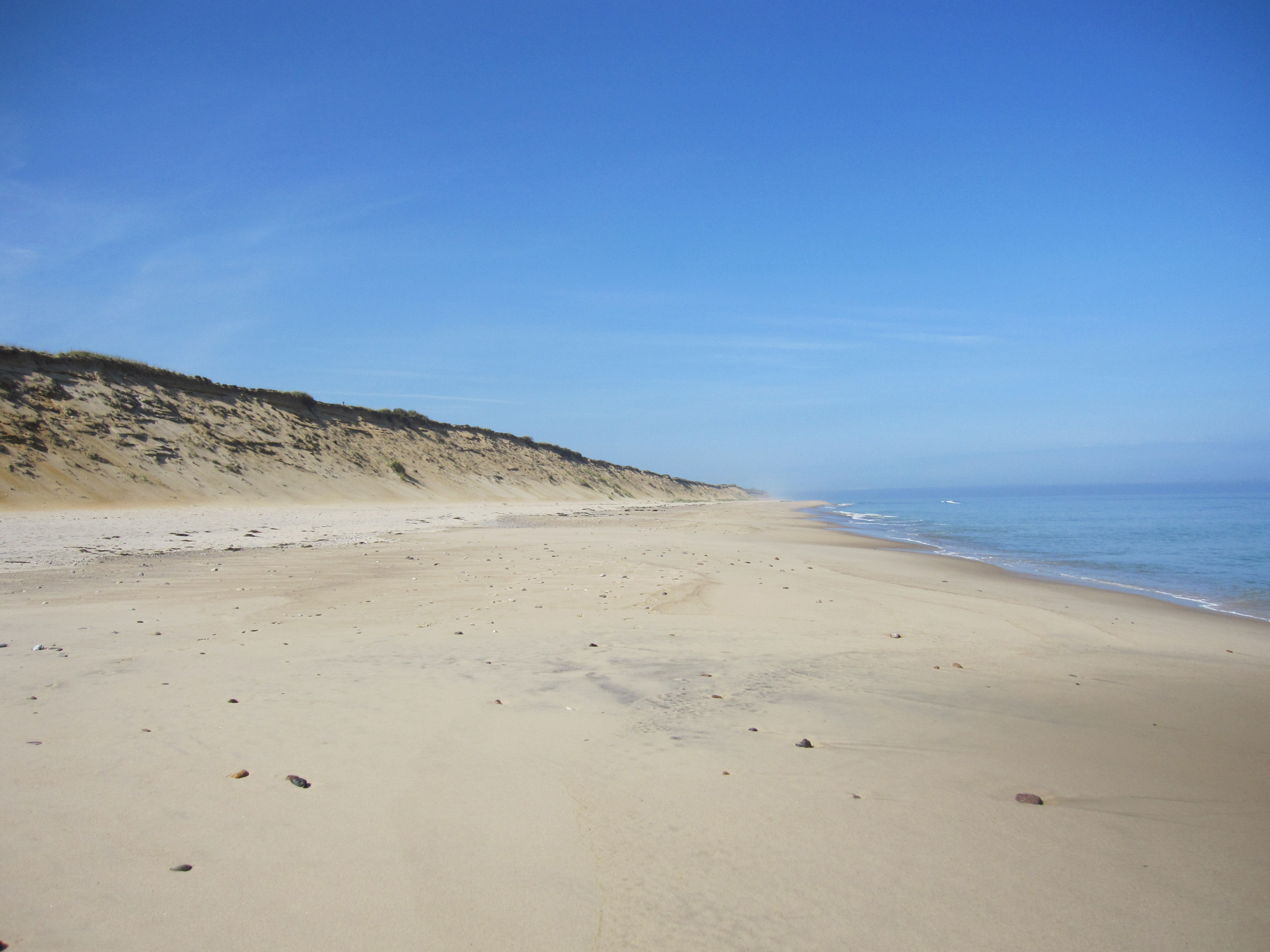
- Beach at Cape Cod

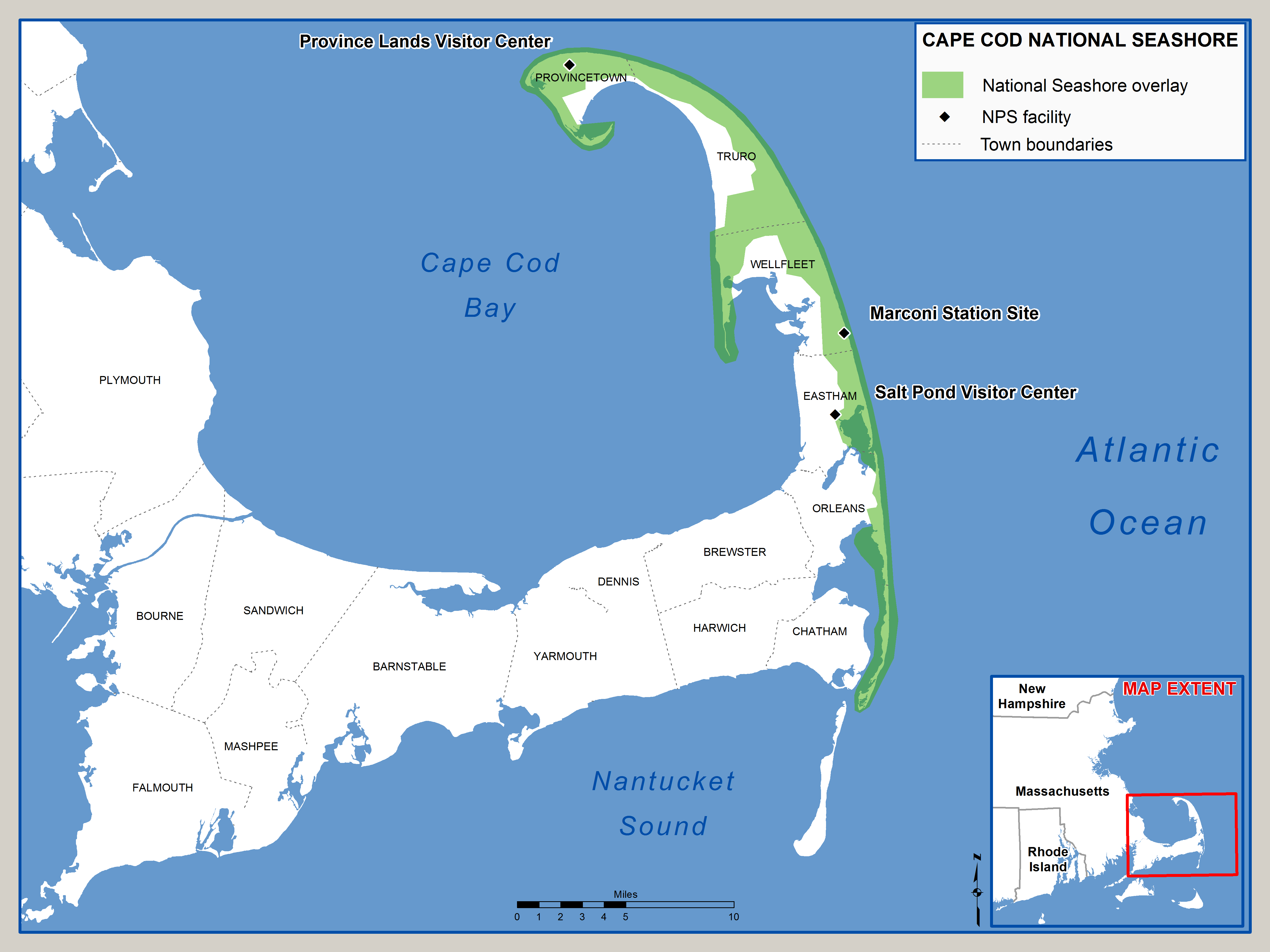
- Location: Barnstable County, Massachusetts, US
- Nearest city: Barnstable, Massachusetts
- Coordinates: 41°50′14″N 69°58′22″W
- Area: 43,607.14 acres (176.4718 km^{2})
- Established: August 7, 1961
- Visitors: 3,968,672 (in 2022)
- Governing body: National Park Service
- Website: Cape Cod National Seashore

A photo of the Cape Cod National Seashore taken for the National Park Service's Mission 66 initiative, ca. 1966.

The Cape Cod National Seashore (CCNS) is a 43,607-acre (68.1 sq mi; 176.5 km^{2}) US national seashore on Cape Cod, in the state of Massachusetts. CCNS was created on August 7, 1961, by President John F. Kennedy, when he signed a bill enacting the legislation he first co-sponsored as a Senator a few years prior. It includes ponds, woods and beachfront of the Atlantic coastal pine barrens ecoregion. The CCNS includes nearly 40 miles (64 km) of seashore along the Atlantic-facing eastern shore of Cape Cod, in the towns of Provincetown, Truro, Wellfleet, Eastham, Orleans and Chatham. It is administered by the National Park Service.

== Places of interest ==
Notable sites encompassed by the CCNS include Marconi Station (site of the first two-way transatlantic radio transmission), the Highlands Center for the Arts (formerly the North Truro Air Force Station), the Dune Shacks of Peaked Hill Bars Historic District (a 1,950-acre historic district containing dune shacks and the dune environment), and the glacial erratic known as Doane Rock.

A former United States Coast Guard station on the ocean in Truro is now operated as a 42-bed youth hostel by Hostelling International USA.

There are several paved bike trails:

- Nauset Bike Trail—Eastham
- Head of the Meadow Trail—Truro
- Province Lands Trails—Provincetown

There are several excellent beaches along the coastline with public facilities available seasonally. These include Race Point Beach in Provincetown and Coast Guard Beach in Eastham. Both of these have made "top beaches in the US" lists over the years, with Coast Guard Beach also selected in 2026 as the representative beach for Massachusetts in a ranking of U.S. states by the number of natural beaches.

== Restoration and conservation efforts ==
As part of the NPS Centennial Initiative, the Herring River estuary will be restored to its natural state through removal of dikes and drains that date back to 1909.

In 2010, the North of Highland Campground was protected with a conservation easement. The Trust for Public Land, the Association to Preserve Cape Cod, the Truro Conservation Trust, and other groups led a grassroots campaign to support the funding for the purchase price of the conservation easement from the federal Land and Water Conservation Fund (LWCF), secured by U.S. Senator John Kerry, U.S. Representative Bill Delahunt, and former Senator Ted Kennedy.

The Biddle Property, home of the late Francis Biddle, who was the U.S. attorney general during World War II and served as the primary American judge during the post-war Nuremberg Trials, was added to the Cape Cod National Seashore in 2011. Using funding from the Land and Water Conservation Fund, the Trust for Public Land purchased the property and conveyed it to the National Park Service.

As part of the restoration efforts beginning in the 2020s, a number of run-down and unsafe buildings of no historical significance were set to be removed from areas around CCNS and the affected lands will be restored. The Great American Outdoors Act had allocated this project approximately $12.5 million through 2025.

== Gallery ==
An entrance to the Cape Cod National Seashore in Eastham, Massachusetts

Cape Cod National Seashore

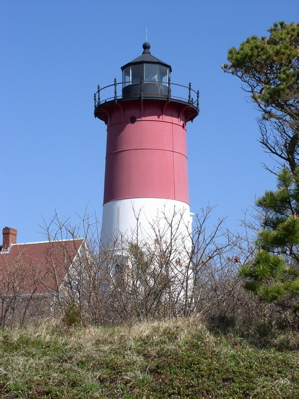
Nauset Light

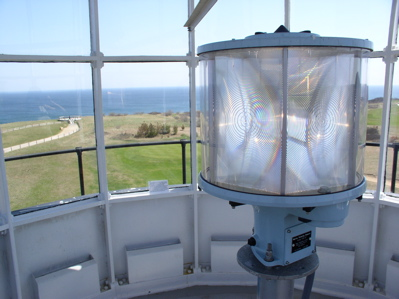
View from Highland Light

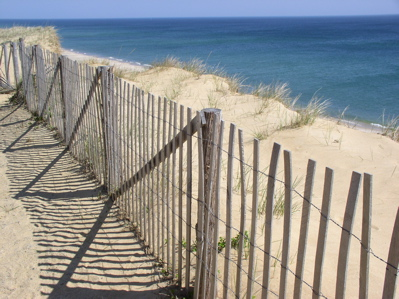
Marconi Beach

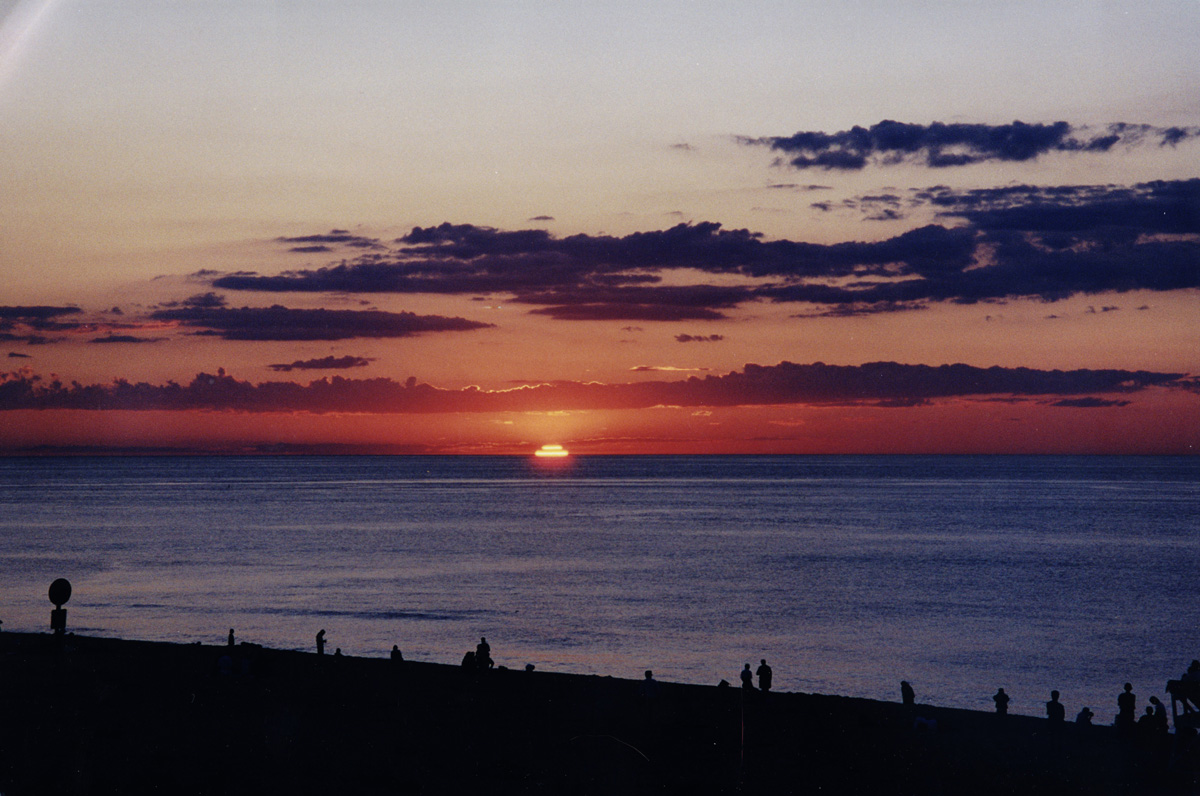
Late July Sunset at Race Point Beach

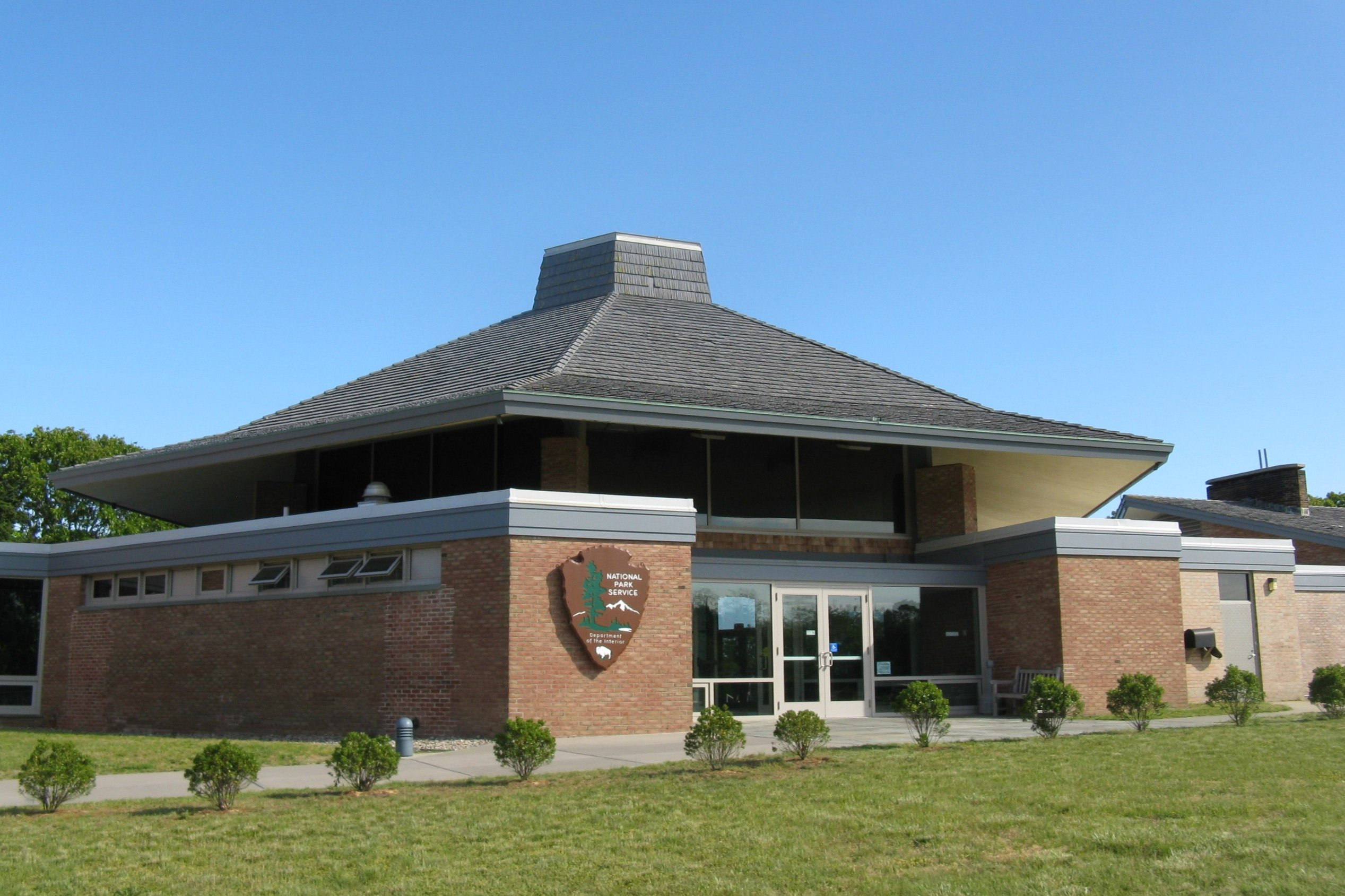
Salt Pond Visitor Center

== See also ==
- Coast Guard Beach (Eastham, Massachusetts)
- East Harbor
- National Register of Historic Places listings in Cape Cod National Seashore
- Nauset Light Beach
- Race Point Light
