= Truro Central School =

School in Truro, Massachusetts, United States

Truro School System is a school district operating a single elementary school, Truro Central School, in Truro, Massachusetts.

Commonly students, after graduating from Truro Central School, attend Nauset Middle School and Nauset Regional High School, both operated by Nauset Public Schools. Truro residents may also enter the middle school program at Provincetown School District. Formerly Truro residents had the option of going to Provincetown High School. Provincetown High School ended operations after 2013.

== History ==
In the 2004–2005 school year it had 117 students, a low enrollment number. Due to new families enrollment increased from that point. In the 2009–2010 school year it had 147 students. In the 2010–2011 school year the school received two additional teachers and a student body of 151, with about 30 coming from outside of Truro. The average size of a class in 2010 was 19.

Brian Davis served as superintendent until June 30, 2014, when he retired. Davis also retired as principal on that day. On July 1, 2014, Michael Gradone became the superintendent of the district; he previously served as such for Nauset Public Schools. Robert Beaudet became principal in 2014.

In 2019 and 2020 the school had 113 students.

Beaudet decided to retire in 2020 due to the COVID-19 pandemic. Stephanie Costigan became acting principal and was also appointed as acting assistant superintendent. Gradone will retire in summer 2021, and Costigan will become the new superintendent.

== Preschool ==
It includes a preschool that was partially subsidized circa 1998 and became tuition free in 2018. Beaudet described the preschool as a measure to keep families in Truro, and Gradone stated "If you want any kind of demographic variety on the Outer Cape, you have to do unusual things." Cynthia McCormick of the Cape Cod Times wrote that the preschool has a "happy and productive vibe that parents say has made it a town gem for years."

== See also ==
- Non-high school district
