= Provincetown, Massachusetts =

- Town
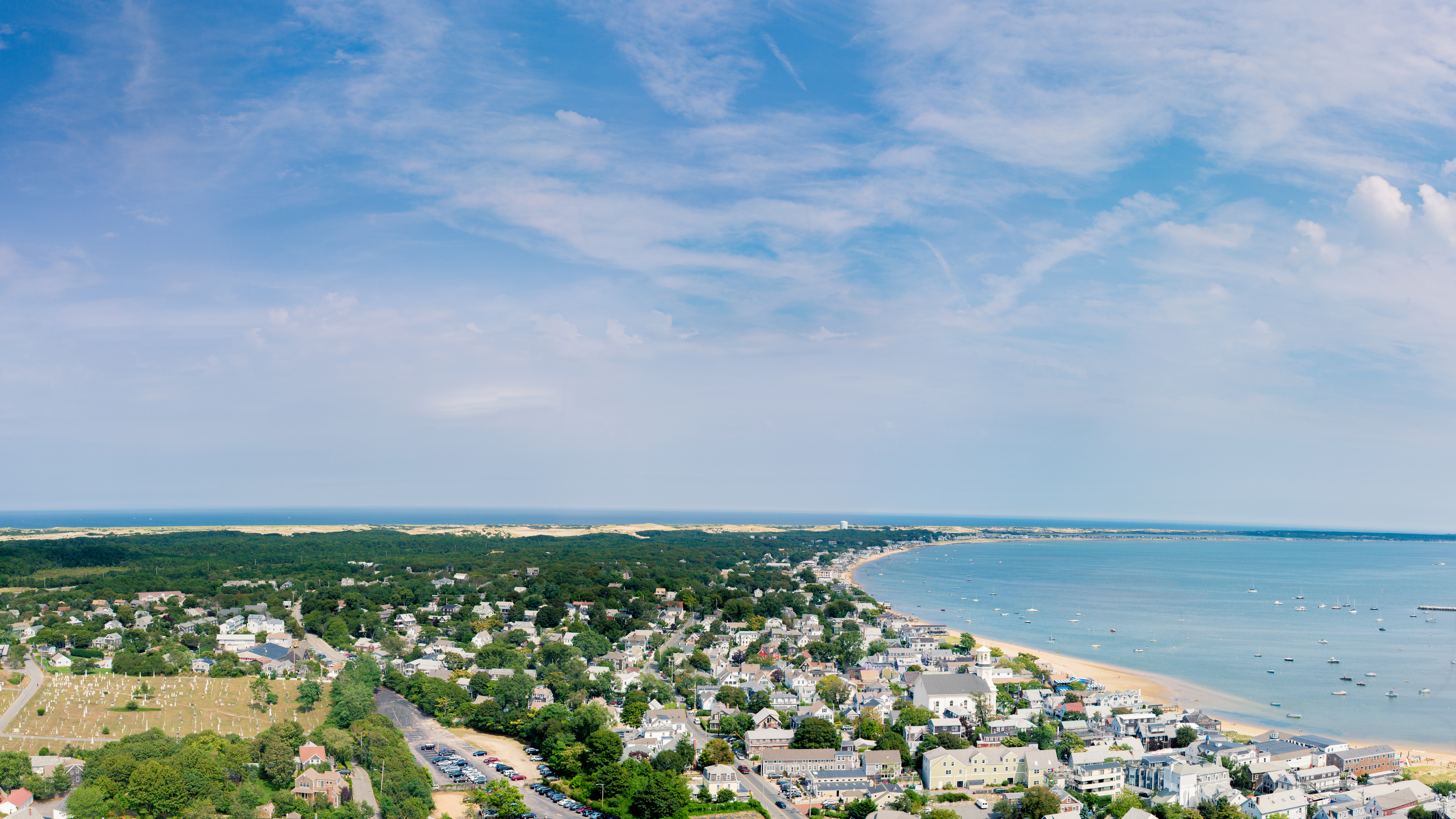
- Aerial view of Provincetown

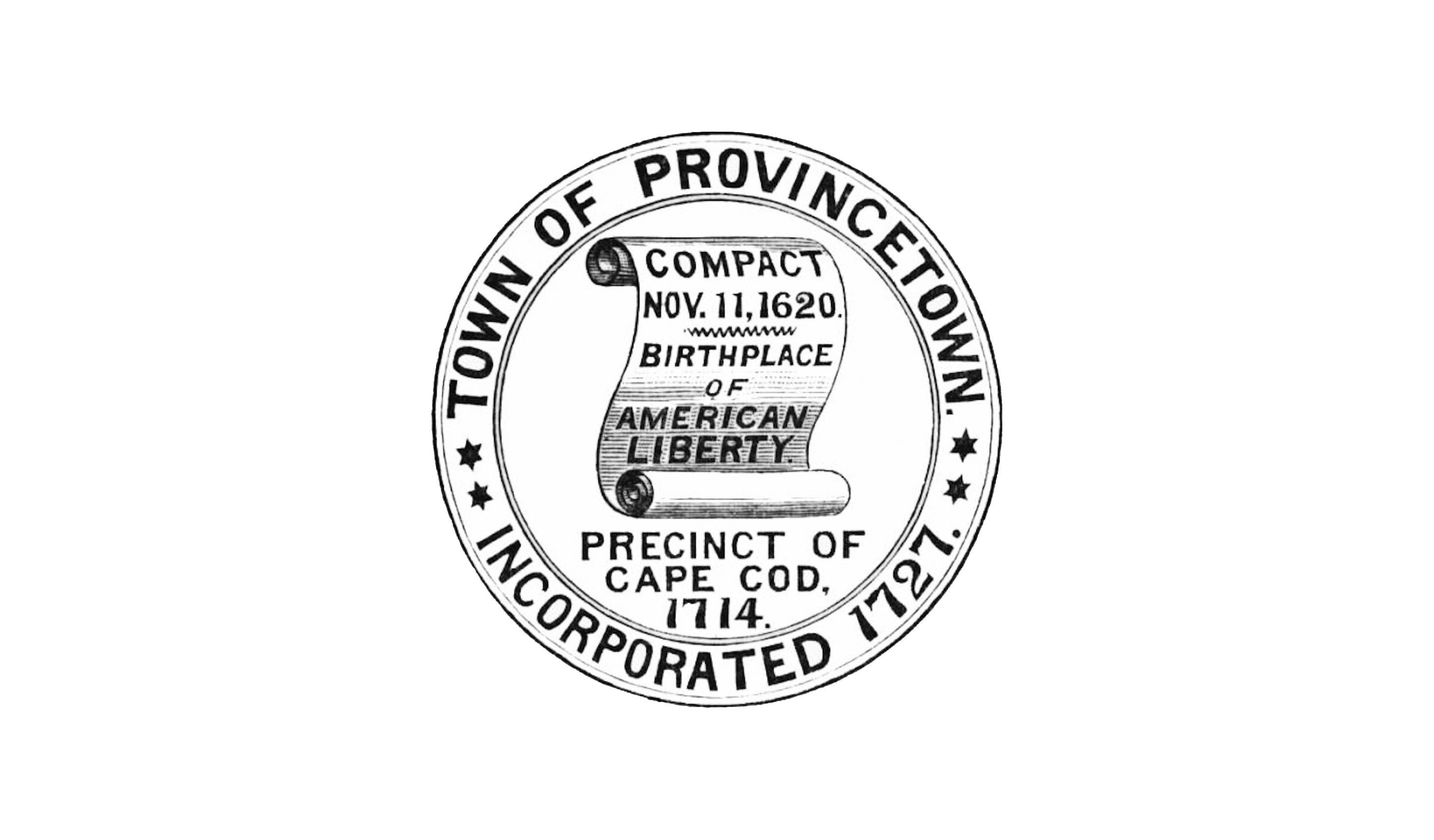
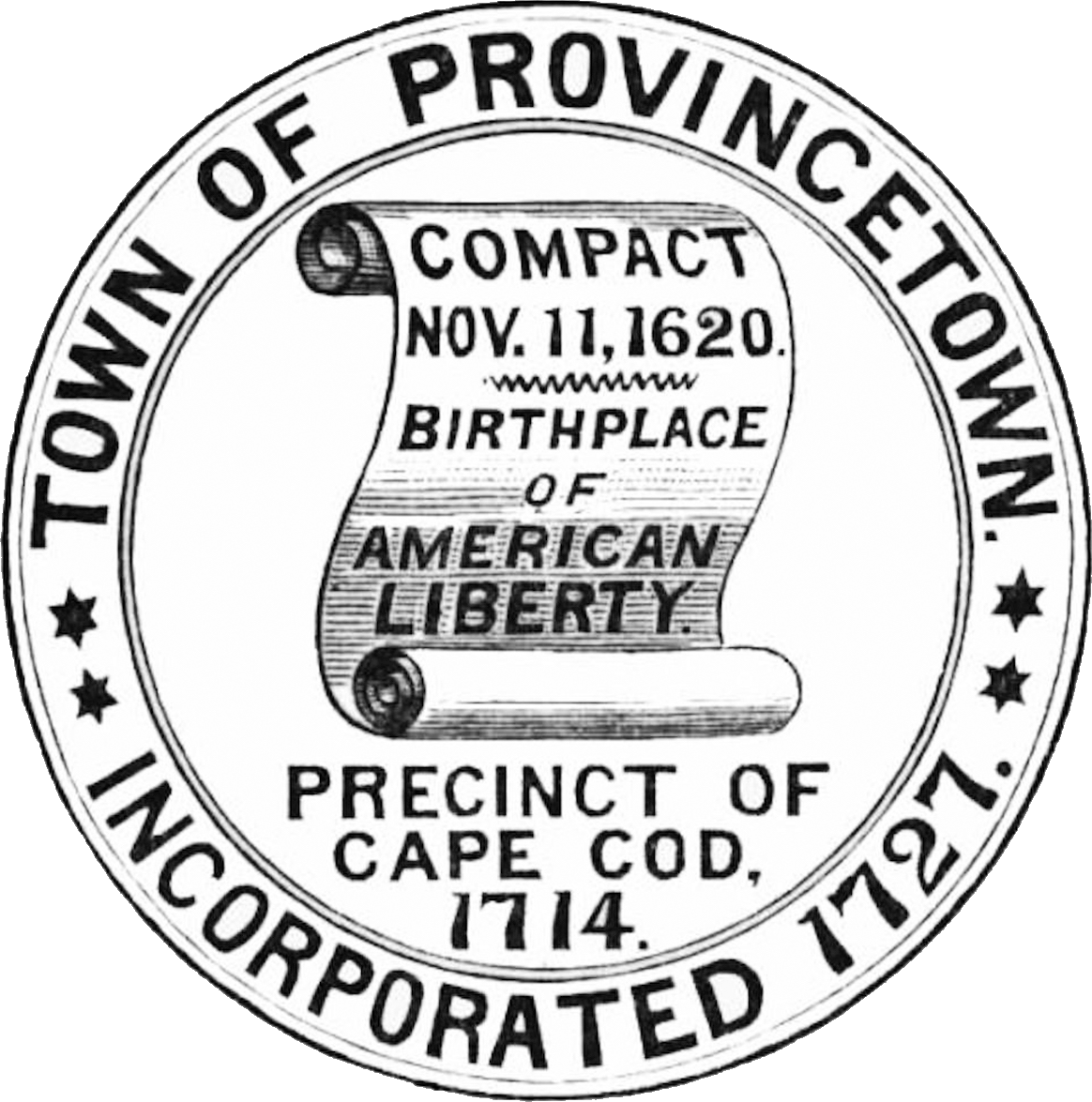
- Flag Seal
- Motto: "Birthplace of American Liberty"
- Location in Barnstable County and Massachusetts

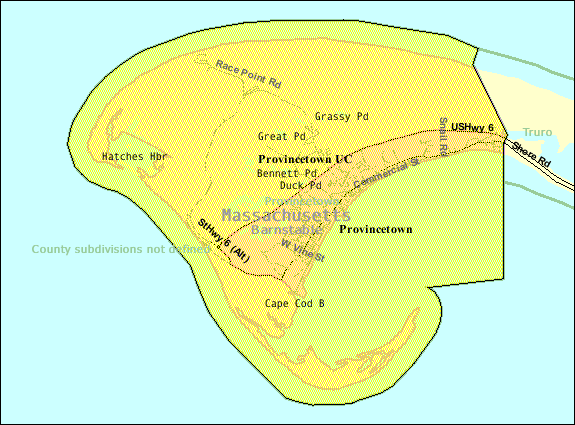
- U.S. Census Map

- Location in Massachusetts Provincetown (the United States)
- Coordinates: 42.058°N 70.179°W
- Country: United States
- State: Massachusetts
- County: Barnstable
- Settled: 1700
- Incorporated: 1727

Government
  - Type: Open town meeting
  - Town Manager: Alex Morse
  - Select board: David Abramson, Chair; John Golden, Vice Chair; Austin Miller, Clerk; Leslie Sandberg; Dana Masterpolo

Area
  - Total: 17.5 sq mi (45 km^{2})
  - Land: 9.7 sq mi (25 km^{2})
  - Water: 7.8 sq mi (20 km^{2})
  - Federal land: 7.0 sq mi (18 km^{2})
  - Local land: 2.7 sq mi (7.0 km^{2})
- Highest elevation: 100 ft (30 m)
- Lowest elevation: 0 ft (0 m)

Population (2020)
  - Total: 3,664
  - Density: 378/sq mi (145.8/km^{2})
  - Local density: 1,114.4/sq mi (430.3/km^{2})
- (Excludes federal land; better approximates actual density of the year-round population)
- Time zone: UTC−5 (Eastern (EST))
  - Summer (DST): UTC−4 (E. Daylight (EDT))
- ZIP Code: 02657
- Area code: 508
- FIPS code: 25-55500
- GNIS feature ID: 0618258
- Website: provincetown-ma.gov

Provincetown (/ˈprɒvɪnsˌtaʊn/) is a town located at the tip of Cape Cod in Massachusetts. A small coastal resort town with a year-round population of 3,664 as of the 2020 United States census, Provincetown has a summer population as high as 60,000. It contains the census-designated place of the same name. Often called "P-town" or "Ptown", the locale is known as a vacation destination for its beaches, harbor, artists, and tourist industry, particularly for LGBTQ people.

== History ==
At the time of European encounter, the area was long settled by the historic Nauset tribe, who had a settlement known as "Meeshawn". They spoke Massachusett, a Southern New England Algonquian language dialect that they shared in common with their closely related neighbors, the Wampanoag.

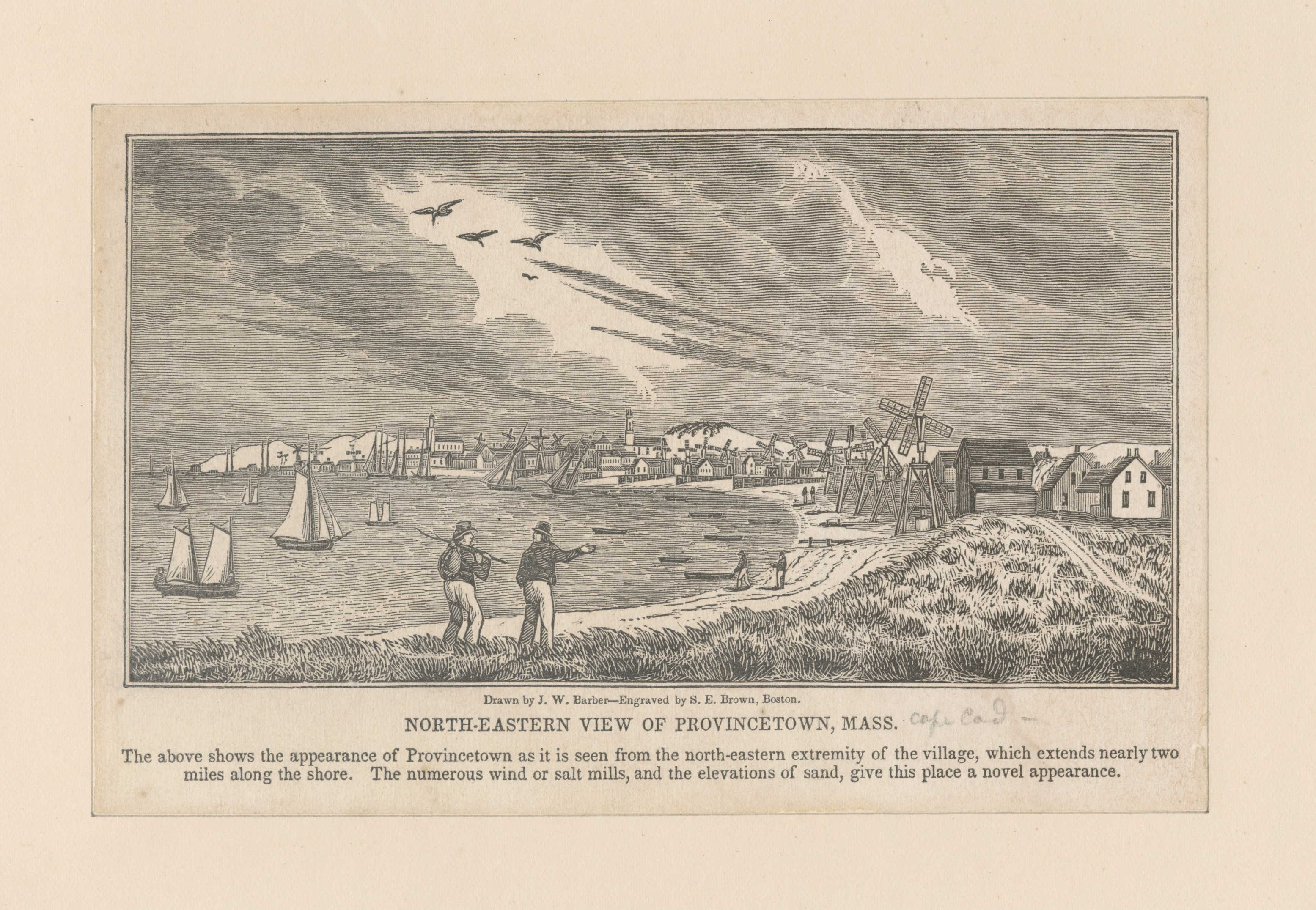
North-eastern view of Provincetown, Mass.

On May 15, 1602, having made landfall from the west and believing it to be an island, Bartholomew Gosnold initially named this area "Shoal Hope". Later that day, after catching a "great store of codfish", he chose instead to name this outermost tip of land "Cape Cod". Notably, that name referred specifically to the area of modern-day Provincetown; not until much later was that that name reused to designate the entire region now known as Cape Cod.

The Pilgrims aboard the Mayflower sighted Cape Cod on November 9, 1620. After two days of failed attempts to sail south against the strong winter seas, they returned to the safety of the harbor, known today as Provincetown Harbor, and set anchor. It was here that the Mayflower Compact was drawn up and signed. The event is memorialized in a sculpture near the Pilgrim Monument. They agreed to settle and build a self-governing community, and came ashore in the West End.

Though the Pilgrims chose to settle across the bay in Plymouth, Cape Cod enjoyed an early reputation for its valuable fishing grounds, and for its harbor: a naturally deep, protected basin that was considered the best along the coast. In 1654, the Governor of the Plymouth Colony purchased this land from the Chief of the Nausets, for a selling price of two brass kettles, six coats, 12 hoes, 12 axes, 12 knives and a box.

That land, which spanned from East Harbor (now known as Pilgrim Lake)—near the present-day border between Provincetown and Truro—to Long Point, was kept for the benefit of Plymouth Colony, which began leasing fishing rights to roving fishermen. The collected fees were used to defray the costs of schools and other projects throughout the colony. In 1678, the fishing grounds were opened up to allow the inclusion of fishermen from the Massachusetts Bay Colony.

In 1692, a new Royal Charter combined the Plymouth and Massachusetts Bay colonies into the Province of Massachusetts Bay. "Cape Cod" was thus officially renamed the "Province Lands".

The first record of a municipal government with jurisdiction over the Province Lands was in 1714, with an Act that declared it the "Precinct of Cape Cod", annexed under control of Truro.

On June 14, 1727, after harboring ships for more than a century, the Precinct of Cape Cod was incorporated as a township. The name chosen by its inhabitants was "Herringtown", which was rejected by the Massachusetts General Court in favor of "Provincetown". The act of incorporation provided that inhabitants of Provincetown could be landholders, but not landowners. They received a quit claim to their property, but the Province retained the title. The land was to be used as it had been from the beginning of the colony—a place for the making of fish. All resources, including the trees, could be used for that purpose. In 1893 the Massachusetts General Court changed the Town's charter, giving the townspeople deeds to the properties they held, while still reserving unoccupied areas.

The population of Provincetown remained small through most of the 18th century.

The town was affected by the American Revolution the same way most of Cape Cod was: the effective British blockade shut down most fish production and shipping and the town dwindled. It was, by happenstance, the location of the wreck of British warship HMS Somerset at the Peaked Hill Bars off the Atlantic Coast of Provincetown in 1778.

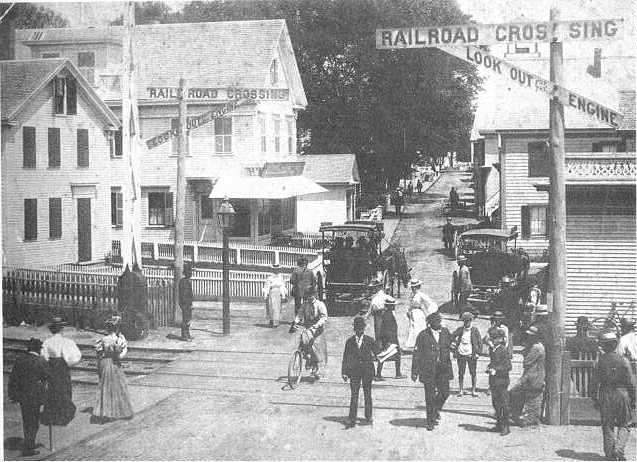
Commercial Street in an 1890s postcard

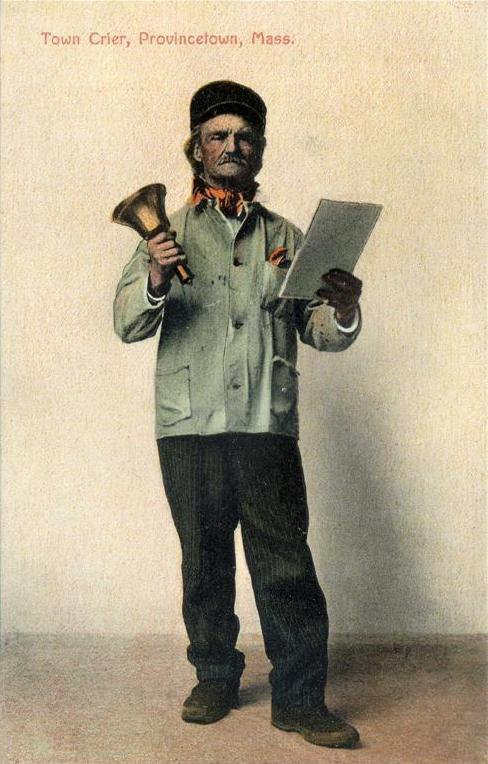
Town crier of Provincetown, 1909

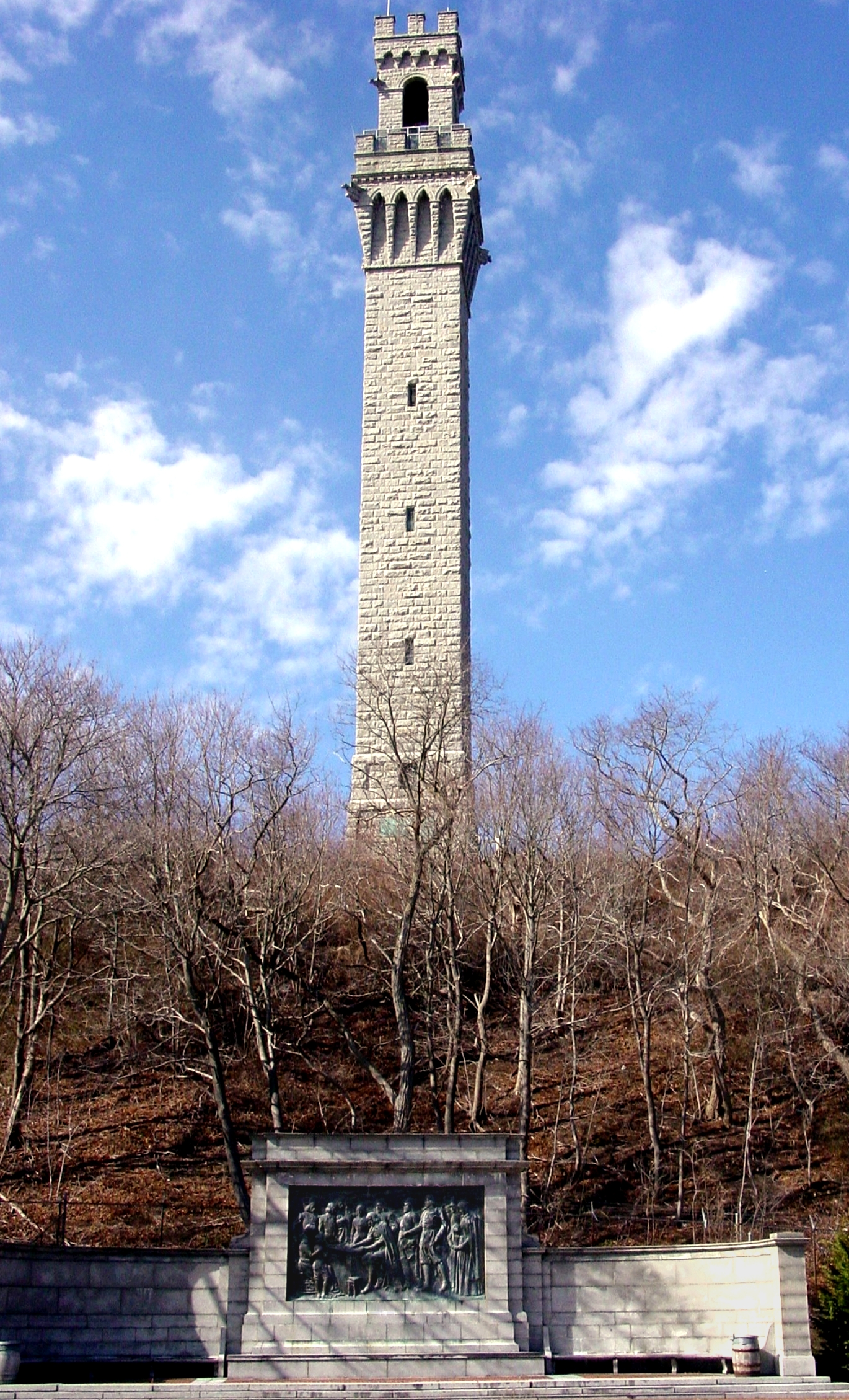
The Pilgrim Monument, designed by Willard T. Sears after the Torre del Mangia in Siena, Italy; built 1907–1910

Following the American Revolution, Provincetown grew rapidly as a fishing and whaling center. The population was bolstered by numerous Portuguese sailors, many of whom were from the Azores, and settled in Provincetown after being hired to work on US ships.

By the 1890s, Provincetown was booming and began to develop a resident population of writers and artists, as well as a summer tourist industry. After the 1898 Portland Gale severely damaged the town's fishing industry, members of the town's art community took over many of the abandoned buildings. By the early decades of the 20th century, the town had acquired an international reputation for its artistic and literary productions. The Provincetown Players was an important experimental theatre company formed during this period. Many of its members lived during other parts of the year in Greenwich Village in New York, and intellectual and artistic connections were woven between the places. In 1898 Charles Webster Hawthorne opened the Cape Cod School of Art, said to be the first outdoor school for figure painting, in Provincetown. Film of his class from 1916 has been preserved.

The town includes eight buildings and two historic districts on the National Register of Historic Places: Provincetown Historic District and Dune Shacks of Peaked Hill Bars Historic District.

In the mid-1960s, Provincetown saw population growth. The town's rural character appealed to the hippies of the era; property was relatively cheap and rents were correspondingly low, especially during the winter. Many of those who came stayed and raised families. Commercial Street, where most of the town's businesses are located, gained numerous cafés, leather shops, and head shops.

By the 1970s, Provincetown had a significant gay population, especially during the summer tourist season, when restaurants, bars and small shops serving the tourist trade were open. There had been a gay presence in Provincetown as early as the start of the 20th century as the artists' colony developed, along with experimental theatre. Drag queens could be seen in performance as early as the 1940s in Provincetown. In 1978 the Provincetown Business Guild (PBG) was formed to promote gay tourism. Today more than 200 businesses belong to the PBG and Provincetown is perhaps the best-known gay summer resort on the East Coast. The 2010 US Census revealed Provincetown to have the highest rate of same-sex couples in the country, at 163.1 per 1,000 households.

Since the 1990s, property prices have risen significantly, causing some residents economic hardship. The housing bust of 2005–2012 caused property values in and around town to fall by 10 percent or more in less than a year. This did not slow down the town's economy, however. Provincetown's tourist season has expanded, and the town has created festivals and week-long events throughout the year. The most established are in the summer: the Portuguese Festival, Bear Week, and PBG's Carnival Week.

In 2017, a memorial was dedicated to those who lost their lives to AIDS.

=== Historic transportation ===
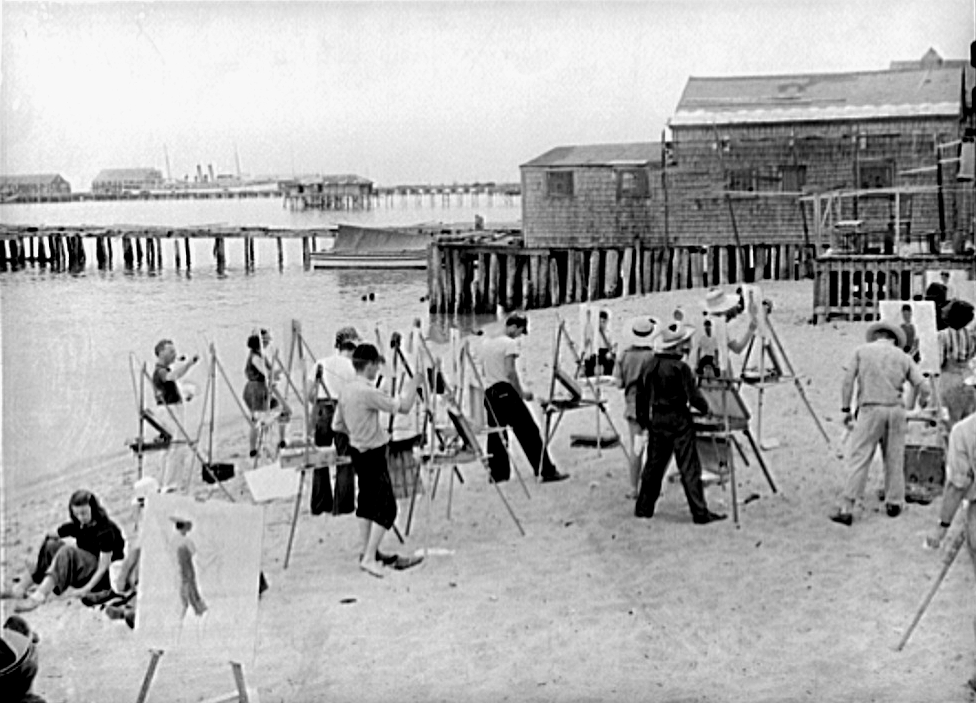
Beachfront art class, 1940

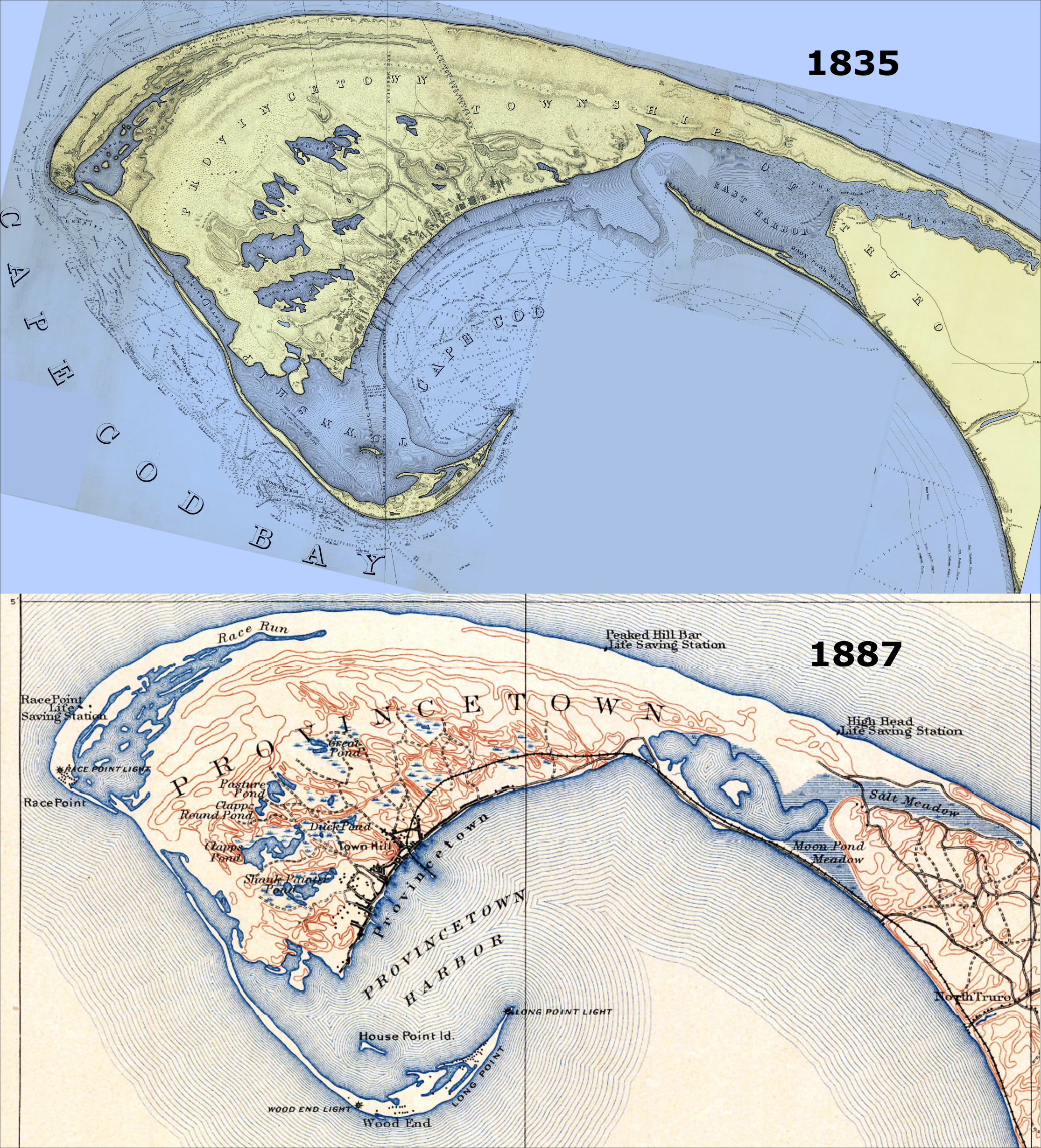
Until the late 19th century, the East Harbor opened into Provincetown Harbor, and there were no roads into Provincetown. East Harbor was diked in 1868, making way first for the railroad and then the automobile.

For nearly all of Provincetown's recorded history, life has revolved around the waterfront—especially the waterfront on its southern shore—which offers a naturally deep harbor with easy and safe boat access, plus natural protection from the wind and waves. An additional element of Provincetown's geography tremendously influenced the manner in which the town evolved: the town was physically isolated, being at the hard-to-reach tip of a long, narrow peninsula.

The East Harbor, which provided the most protected mooring place in Provincetown, had a 1,000-foot-wide (305 m) inlet from Provincetown Harbor, and effectively blocked off access to Provincetown by land. Until the late 19th century, no road led to Provincetown—the only land route connecting the village to points back toward the mainland was along a thin stretch of beach along the shore to the north (known locally as the "backshore"). A wooden bridge was erected over the East Harbor in 1854, only to be destroyed by a winter storm and ice two years later. Although the bridge was replaced the following year, any traveler who crossed it still needed to traverse several miles over sand routes, which, together with the backshore route, was occasionally washed out by storms. This made Provincetown very much like an island. Its residents relied almost entirely upon its harbor for its communication, travel, and commerce needs.

That changed in 1868, when the mouth of the East Harbor was diked to enable the laying of track for the arrival of the railroad. The railroad was completed, to great fanfare, in 1873; and the wooden bridge and sand road was finally replaced by a formal roadway in 1877. The railroad terminated at Railroad Wharf, known today as MacMillan Pier. It provided an easy means for fishermen to offload their vessels and ship their catch to the cities by rail.

The railroad was not the only late arrival to Provincetown. Even roads within the town were slow to be constructed:

There was then no road through the town. With no carts, carriages, wagons, horses or oxen, why a road? ... Here every man had a path from his house to his boat or vessel, and once launched, he was on the broad highway of nations without tax or toll. There were paths to the neighbors, paths to school, paths to church; tortuous paths perhaps, but they were good pilots by night or day, on land or water. Besides, at low water there was a road such as none else could boast, washed completely twice a day from year to year, wide enough and free enough and long enough, if followed, for the armies of the Netherlands.

— Shebnah Rich, Truro—Cape Cod. Or, Land Marks and Sea Marks (1883)

The town's internal road layout reflects the historic importance of the waterfront, the key to communication and commerce with the outside world. As the town grew, it organically expanded along the harborfront. The main "thoroughfare" was the hard-packed beach, where all commerce and socializing took place. Early deeds refer to a "Town Rode", which was little more than a footpath that ran behind the houses. In 1835, County Commissioners turned that into "Front Street", now known as Commercial Street. "Back Street" ran parallel to Front Street, but was set back from the harbor—today it is known as Bradford Street.

The houses faced the water then; since then some of the houses have been turned around; some of them still have the front door on the shore side. One man, a doctor, who had not lived long in town, proposed that the street be made sixty-four feet wide, but they soon voted down such foolishness as that from foreigners. He tried to compromise on thirty-two feet, but twenty-two feet seemed wide enough for all possible purposes, and twenty-two feet wide it is.

— Nancy W. Paine Smith, The Provincetown Book (1922)

== Geography ==
Provincetown is located at the very tip of Cape Cod, encompassing a total area of 17.5 square miles (45 km^{2})—55% of that, or 9.7 sq mi (25 km^{2}), is land area, and the remaining 7.8 sq mi (20 km^{2}) water area. Surrounded by water in every direction except due east, the town has 21.3 miles (34.3 km) of coastal shoreline. Provincetown is bordered to the east by its only neighbor, the town of Truro, and by Provincetown Harbor to the southeast, Cape Cod Bay to the south and west, Massachusetts Bay to the northwest and north, and the Atlantic Ocean to the northeast.

The town is 45 miles (72 km) north (by road) from Hyannis, and 62 miles (100 km) by road to the Sagamore Bridge, which spans the Cape Cod Canal and connects Cape Cod to the mainland. Provincetown is 45 miles (72 km) east by southeast from Boston by air or sea, and 115 miles (185 km) by road.

About 4,500 acres, or about 73% of the town's land area, is owned by the National Park Service, which operates the Cape Cod National Seashore, leaving about 2.7 sq mi (7.0 km^{2}) of land under the town's jurisdiction. To the north lie the "Province Lands", the area of dunes and small ponds extending from Mount Ararat in the east to Race Point in the west, along the Massachusetts Bay shore. The Cape Cod Bay shoreline extends from Race Point to the far west, to Wood End in the south, eastward to Long Point, which in turn points inward towards the town, and provides a natural barrier for Provincetown Harbor. All three points are marked by lighthouses. The town's population center extends along the harbor, south of the Seashore's lands.

Mount Ararat was named after Noah's landing place, while Mount Gilboa, and another dune, was named for the mountain described in the book of Samuel.

=== Climate ===
The town of Provincetown has a warm-summer humid continental climate (Dfb), closely bordering on oceanic climate. The plant hardiness zone is 7a, with an average annual extreme minimum air temperature of 4.9 °F (−15.1 °C). The average seasonal (Nov–Apr) snowfall total is around 30 inches (76 cm). The average snowiest month is February, which corresponds to the annual peak in nor'easter activity.

Climate data for Provincetown, Barnstable County, Massachusetts (1981–2010 averages).
Month	Jan	Feb	Mar	Apr	May	Jun	Jul	Aug	Sep	Oct	Nov	Dec	Year
Record high °F (°C)	62 (17)	69 (21)	79 (26)	85 (29)	92 (33)	98 (37)	104 (40)	98 (37)	93 (34)	82 (28)	77 (25)	66 (19)	104 (40)
Mean maximum °F (°C)	51 (11)	50 (10)	58 (14)	68 (20)	79 (26)	86 (30)	91 (33)	89 (32)	83 (28)	74 (23)	64 (18)	56 (13)	91 (33)
Mean daily maximum °F (°C)	37.6 (3.1)	38.6 (3.7)	43.9 (6.6)	52.2 (11.2)	63.0 (17.2)	72.9 (22.7)	79.0 (26.1)	78.2 (25.7)	71.4 (21.9)	61.3 (16.3)	52.0 (11.1)	43.2 (6.2)	57.4 (14.1)
Daily mean °F (°C)	31.5 (−0.3)	32.3 (0.2)	37.4 (3.0)	45.6 (7.6)	55.2 (12.9)	65.1 (18.4)	71.3 (21.8)	70.6 (21.4)	64.1 (17.8)	54.3 (12.4)	45.7 (7.6)	36.9 (2.7)	50.7 (10.4)
Mean daily minimum °F (°C)	25.3 (−3.7)	25.9 (−3.4)	30.9 (−0.6)	38.9 (3.8)	47.5 (8.6)	57.2 (14.0)	63.5 (17.5)	63.1 (17.3)	56.9 (13.8)	47.2 (8.4)	39.3 (4.1)	30.6 (−0.8)	43.9 (6.6)
Mean minimum °F (°C)	6 (−14)	9 (−13)	16 (−9)	27 (−3)	36 (2)	44 (7)	52 (11)	50 (10)	42 (6)	32 (0)	24 (−4)	13 (−11)	5 (−15)
Record low °F (°C)	−6 (−21)	−8 (−22)	6 (−14)	16 (−9)	25 (−4)	35 (2)	38 (3)	34 (1)	29 (−2)	19 (−7)	14 (−10)	−6 (−21)	−8 (−22)
Average precipitation inches (mm)	3.70 (94)	3.17 (81)	4.63 (118)	4.07 (103)	3.28 (83)	3.46 (88)	2.96 (75)	3.24 (82)	3.55 (90)	3.81 (97)	4.26 (108)	3.83 (97)	43.96 (1,117)
Average snowfall inches (cm)	6.9 (18)	7.4 (19)	4.5 (11)	0.7 (1.8)	0.0 (0.0)	0.0 (0.0)	0.0 (0.0)	0.0 (0.0)	0.0 (0.0)	0.0 (0.0)	0.2 (0.51)	4.1 (10)	23.8 (60.31)
Average relative humidity (%)	68.1	66.2	66.6	69.2	70.5	72.9	74.8	73.7	74.9	69.9	67.1	66.5	70.1
Source: PRISM Climate Group

== Demographics ==
Historical population
Year	Pop.	±%
1790	454	—
1850	3,157	+595.4%
1860	3,206	+1.6%
1870	3,865	+20.6%
1880	4,346	+12.4%
1890	4,642	+6.8%
1900	4,247	−8.5%
1910	4,369	+2.9%
1920	4,246	−2.8%
1930	3,808	−10.3%
1940	3,668	−3.7%
1950	3,795	+3.5%
1960	3,389	−10.7%
1970	2,911	−14.1%
1980	3,536	+21.5%
1990	3,561	+0.7%
2000	3,431	−3.7%
2010	2,942	−14.3%
2020	3,664	+24.5%
2024*	3,729	+1.8%
* = population estimate. Source: United States census records and Population Estimates Program data.

=== United States census information ===
According to the U.S. census of 2010, there were 2,942 people living in the town (down 14.3% since 2000). The population density was 304.2 inhabitants per square mile (117.5/km^{2}). There were 4,494 housing units (up 15.5%) at an average density of 464.7 per square mile (179.4/km^{2}). The racial makeup of the town was 91.5% White, 4.0% African American, 0.6% Native American, 0.6% Asian, 1.6% from other races, and 1.7% from two or more races. Hispanic or Latino of any race were 4.8% of the population.

The top reported ancestries were Irish (26.7%, up 9.3% from 2000), English (17.4%, up 2.6%), Portuguese (14.6%, down 8.2%), Italian (13.5%, up 3.4%), and German (12.5%, up 3.6%).

Population pyramid 2010
%	Males	Age	Females	%
1.4		85+		1.8
0.8		80–84		1.6
1.7		75–79		2.1
1.9		70–74		2.3
3.7		65–69		3.0
5.7		60–64		5.8
6.2		55–59		5.2
7.7		50–54		5.7
7.8		45–49		4.2
5.1		40–44		2.8
3.5		35–39		2.0
2.3		30–34		2.0
1.9		25–29		1.8
1.0		20–24		1.3
1.0		15–19		1.1
1.0		10–14		0.8
1.0		5–9		0.8
0.7		0–4		1.1

There were 1,765 households (down 3.9%), out of which 416 (23.6%) had families, 115 (6.5%) had children under the age of 18 living within them, and 76.4% were non-families. The average household size was 1.64 persons/household, and the average family size was 2.55.

The distribution of the population, broken down by age and gender, is shown in the population pyramid. In 2010, 6.8% of the population was under the age of 18, and the median age was 52.3. There were 1,602 males and 1,340 females.

For 2011, the estimated median income for a year-round household in the town was $46,547, with a mean household income of $74,840. For families, the median income was $87,228, and the mean is $84,050. For nonfamily households, the median income was $42,375, and the mean, $71,008. Median earnings for male full-time, year-round workers was $49,688, versus $36,471 for females. The per capita income for the town was $41,488. About 2.1% of families and 15.4% of the population were below the poverty line, including 26.0% of those under age 18 and 7.5% of those age 65 or over.

Provincetown's ZIP Code has the highest concentration of same-sex couple households of any ZIP code in the United States.

=== Demographics in a resort town ===
Data from traditional demographic sources like the U.S. Census, municipal voting rolls and property records may not accurately portray the demography of resort towns. They often reveal unusual results, as in this case, where the number of housing units far exceeds the town's total population, where that number of housing units rose 15% while the population dropped 14%, and where nearly 61% of the housing stock is vacant, with 53% designated "for seasonal, recreational, or occasional use", according to the census.

In the decade spanning the years 2000 through 2010, Provincetown's small year-round population declined 14.3% from 3,431 to 2,942, yet during the summer months, population estimates vary wildly, ranging from 19,000 to 60,000. Census figures are unable to capture these dynamic population fluctuations that are associated with seasonal tourism. Part-time residents, which includes non-resident property owners and seasonal residents, are not counted in the census.

== Arts and culture ==
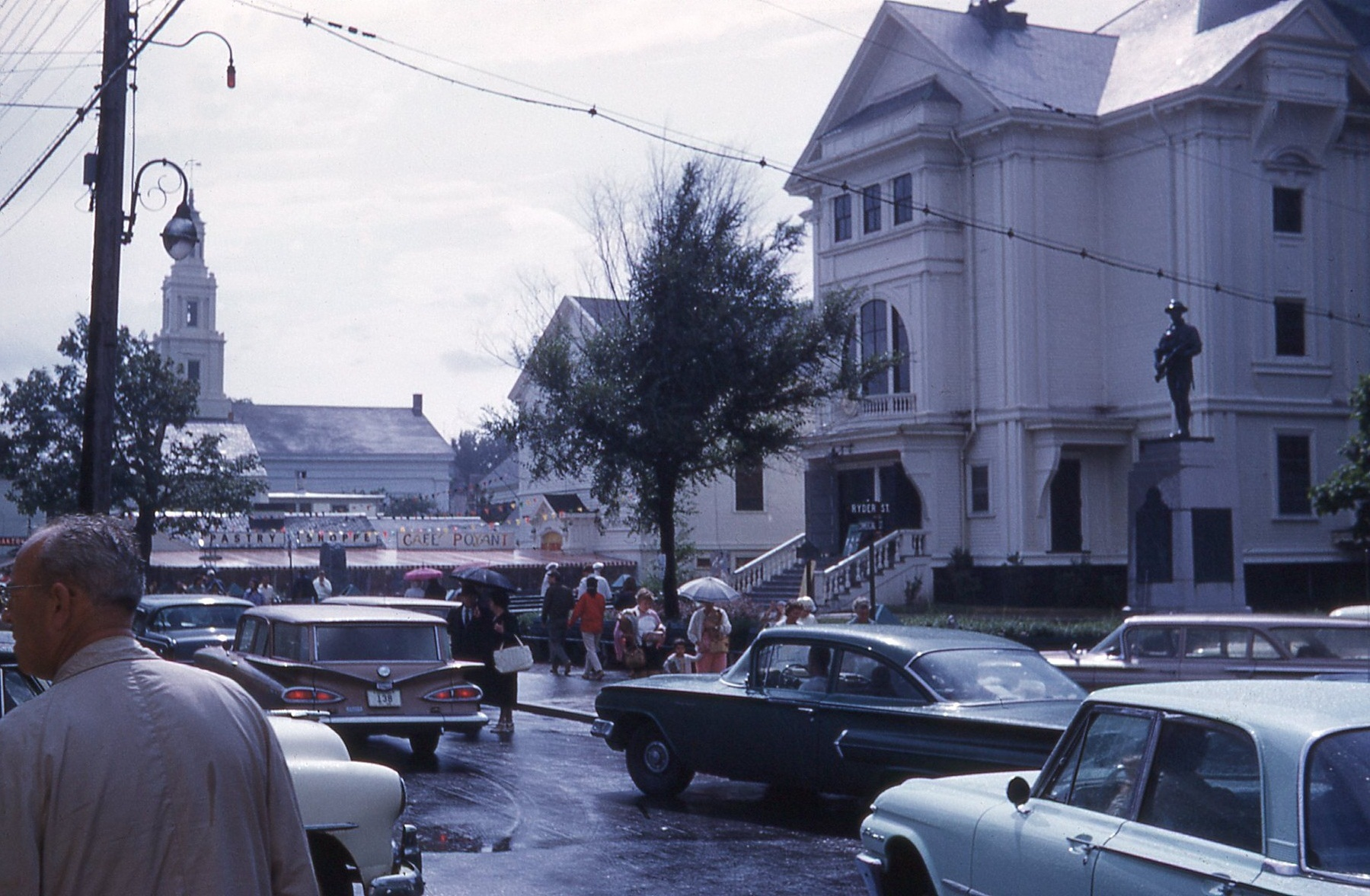
Town Hall and Cafe Poyant, 1961

In 1940, Catharine Sargent Huntington, Edwin Pettit, and Virginia Thoms founded the Provincetown Playhouse on the Wharf. The playhouse replaced an older structure that existed between 1915 and 1924. Huntington served as owner and manager of the playhouse until 1973. During her time as manager, a Eugene O'Neill drama was produced each summer season, and the theater hosted an O'Neill Festival in 1966, during which ten of his plays were produced.

From 1955 to 1959, the Sun Gallery was run by Yvonne Andersen and Dominic Falcone. It was an art exhibition that took place during the summer where young and up and coming artists could show their work.

The Fine Arts Work Center is a nonprofit educational enterprise, located in Provincetown since 1968. Its stated mission is to encourage the growth and development of emerging visual artists and writers through residency programs, to propagate aesthetic values and experience, and to restore the year-round vitality of the historic art colony of Provincetown.

Provincetown Art Association and Museum (PAAM) is a nationally recognized, year-round cultural institution that celebrated its Centennial in 2014. PAAM mounts 35 art exhibitions each year, offers workshops in the fine arts for children, youth, and adults, and hosts an array of programs and events to enrich visitor experience. The PAAM Permanent Collection consists of 3,000 objects, which are displayed throughout the year in the PAAM galleries.

Between 2004 and 2007, PAAM received four Rural Development grants and loans totaling $3 million to increase the museum's space, add climate-controlled facilities, renovate a historic sea captain's house (the Hargood House) and cover cost overruns. As the mission of the Rural Development program is "To increase economic opportunity and improve the quality of life for all rural Americans", the USDA considered Provincetown's residents in the 2000s to still be rural and to still require such federal assistance

In 2003, Provincetown received a $1.95 million low interest loan from the Rural Development program of the U.S. Department of Agriculture to help rebuild the town's MacMillan Pier. It primarily serves the town's active fishing fleet, and also tourists and high-speed ferries.

The Atlantic House in Provincetown is considered the oldest gay bar in the US and Frommer's calls it "the nation's premier gay bar". Provincetown is the setting for the annual Women's Week festival. Held in mid-October since 1984 and attended by almost 2,000 women, it is the "longest running lesbian cultural event in the Northeast". Since 1975, Provincetown has been the host city to Fantasia Fair, the world's first and longest-running annual conference that focuses on gender diversity and transgender issues.

The Provincetown International Film Festival, honors the best in independent and avant-garde film. Among the honorees for 2014 were actress Patricia Clarkson and director David Cronenberg. Previous honorees include Matt Dillon, Harmony Korine, Parker Posey, Roger Corman, Vera Farmiga, Darren Aronofsky, Quentin Tarantino, Jane Lynch, Gael García Bernal, Tilda Swinton, Kathleen Turner, Jim Jarmusch, Todd Haynes, Gus Van Sant, and John Waters. Waters, a summer resident, is a major participant in the festival.

In November 2011, the Provincetown Theater Company became the first theater company in New England to stage a live-action dramatic theatrical presentation of horror-fantasy author H.P. Lovecraft. The story was Lovecraft's 1919 classic, "The Picture in the House," and was described as "the macabre come to life." The adaptation was produced for the 22nd Fall Playwright's Festival.

== Parks and recreation ==
Veterans Memorial Community Center serves as the area community center. By 2012, Veterans Memorial Elementary School closed and was being refurbished to become a community center. In 2014, the town government considered building a second floor on the facility to add affordable housing.

== Government ==
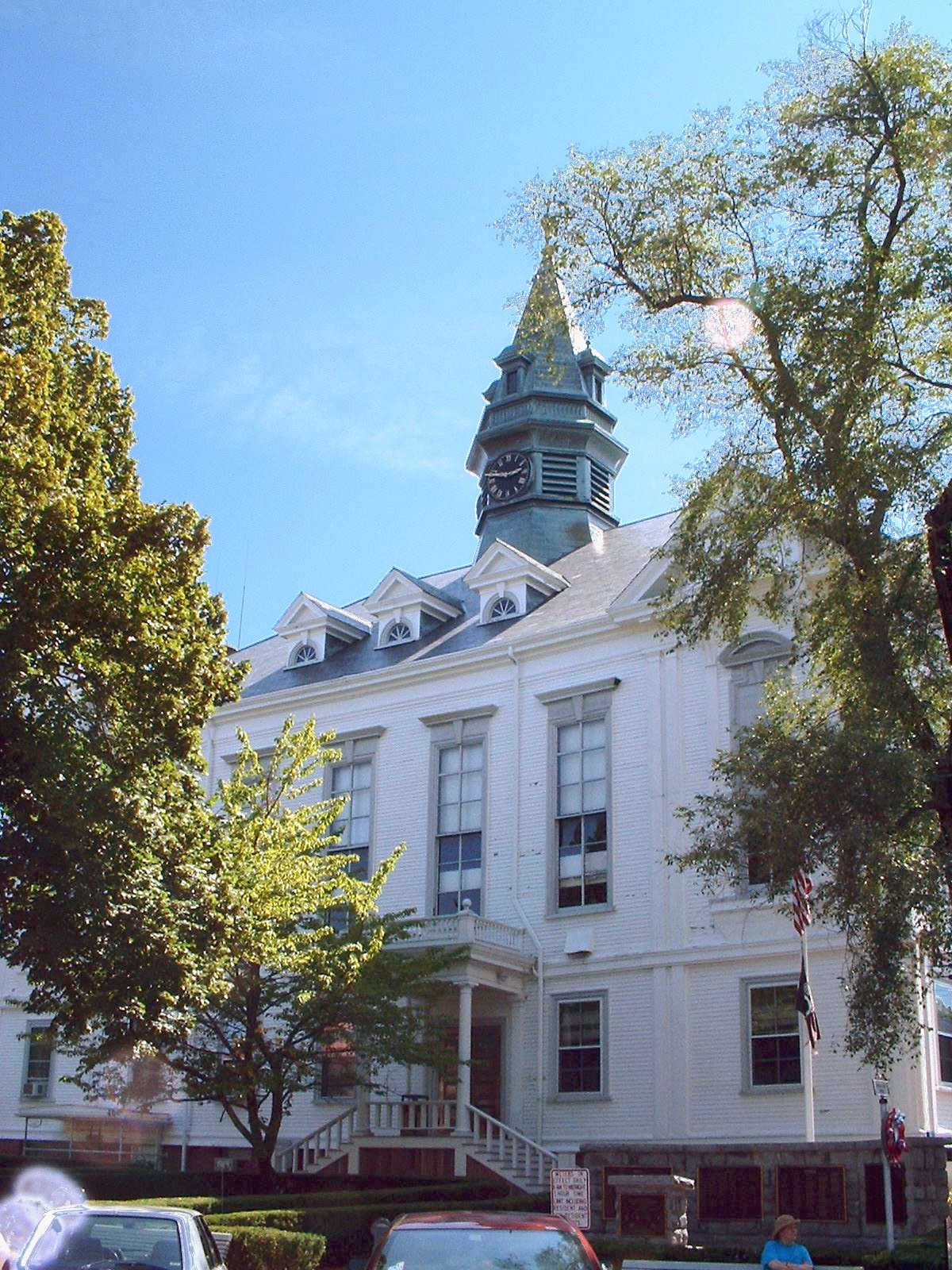
Provincetown Town Hall

Provincetown is governed, like most New England towns, by the open town meeting form of government. The citizens, gathered in the town meeting, act as the legislative branch and approve the budget and amend the town's bylaws, while the popularly elected Board of Selectmen act as the executive branch and hire and oversee the Town Manager, meet regularly to determine policy, and appoint members of other boards and commissions. The town has its own police and fire departments, both of which are stationed on Shank Painter Road. The town's post office is located on Commercial Street, near the town's Fourth Wharf. The Provincetown Public Library is also located on Commercial Street, occupying the former Center Methodist Episcopal Church building since 2005.

Provincetown is represented in the Massachusetts House of Representatives as a part of the Fourth Barnstable District, which includes (with the exception of Brewster) all the towns east and north of Harwich on the Cape. The seat is held by Democrat Sarah Peake, a former Provincetown selectman. The town is represented in the Massachusetts Senate as a part of the Cape and Islands District, which includes all of Cape Cod, Martha's Vineyard, and Nantucket except the towns of Bourne, Falmouth, Sandwich and a portion of Barnstable. The Senate seat is held by Democrat Julian Cyr. Provincetown is patrolled by its own Police Department as well as the Second (Yarmouth) Barracks of Troop D of the Massachusetts State Police.

On the national level, Provincetown is a part of Massachusetts's 9th congressional district, and is currently represented by Bill Keating. Following the death of Ted Kennedy, the state's senior (Class I) member of the United States Senate was John Kerry (last re-elected in 2008) until he became Secretary of State; that seat has been occupied by Ed Markey since July 16, 2013. The other (Class II) senate seat is held by Elizabeth Warren, a Democrat, elected in the November 2012 elections and sworn in as senator in January 2013.

In the 2020 US Presidential Election, Democratic nominee Joe Biden received 91.9 percent of the vote to Republican incumbent Donald Trump's 7 percent. In the 2024 presidential election, Democratic nominee Kamala Harris received 90.9 percent of the vote and Republican nominee Donald Trump received 7.2 percent.

== Education ==
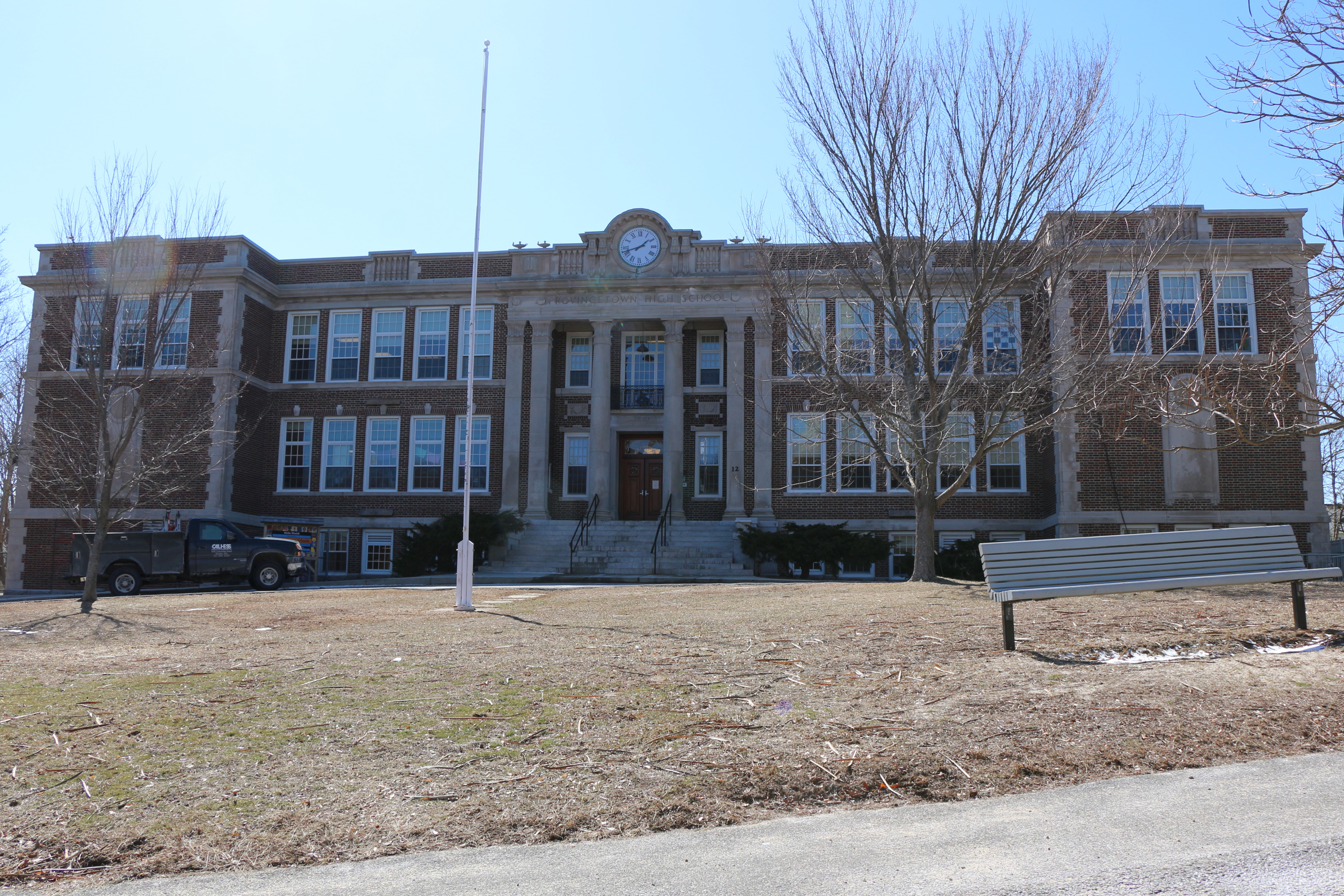
Provincetown Public Schools facility, formerly Provincetown High School

Provincetown Schools operates the public schools for elementary and middle school levels, with the main facility being the grade 1–8 International Baccalaureate World School, verified in 2013 in the Primary Years Program and in 2014 in the Middle Years program. Provincetown Schools educates approximately 120 children in grades Pre-K–8. The Veterans Memorial Community Center houses Provincetown Schools Early Learning Center (Wee Care and Preschool ages 3–5 and kindergarten).

In 2010, the Provincetown school board elected to phase out the high school program of Provincetown High School, at the end of the 2012−2013 school year, and send students to nearby Nauset Regional High School (of Nauset Public Schools) in North Eastham, beginning with the 2013−2014 academic year. Provincetown students in grades 9 and 10 were already attending Nauset by 2012.

There are no private schools in Provincetown; high school students from the town will now attend Cape Cod Regional Technical High School in Harwich or Nauset Regional High School in North Eastham. Prior to its closing, Provincetown High School (PHS) served students from seventh through twelfth grades (and for a time also accepted students from Truro). In 2012, Provincetown High School was recognized as one of the smallest high schools in the country with a student population of 32 students in grades 10–12. In 2018 there were about 45–50 students at the high school level from Provincetown.

There are private scholarships for students from Provincetown and Truro: the John Anderson Francis Family Scholarship Fund and the Captain Joseph F. Oliver Scholarship Fund. Circa 2019 each year the number of applicants ranged from 6–10, a figure the organizers consider to be low.

== Media ==
=== Newspapers ===
Provincetown is served by two weekly newspapers. The older among them is the Provincetown Banner. However, under the ownership of Gannett, the Banner stopped producing local content, instead reprinting stories from other Gannett-owned newspapers in the region. As a result, The Provincetown Independent was formed in 2019 by a group which included some former Banner employees. The Independent prints weekly and had a circulation of around 3,200 in 2021.

== Infrastructure ==
=== Transportation ===
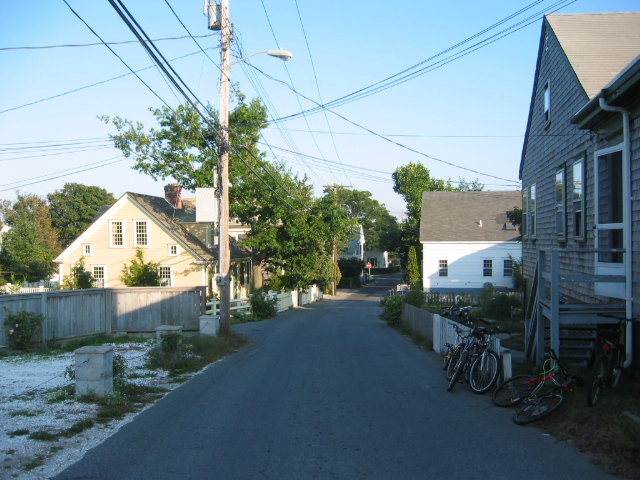
Residential street in Provincetown

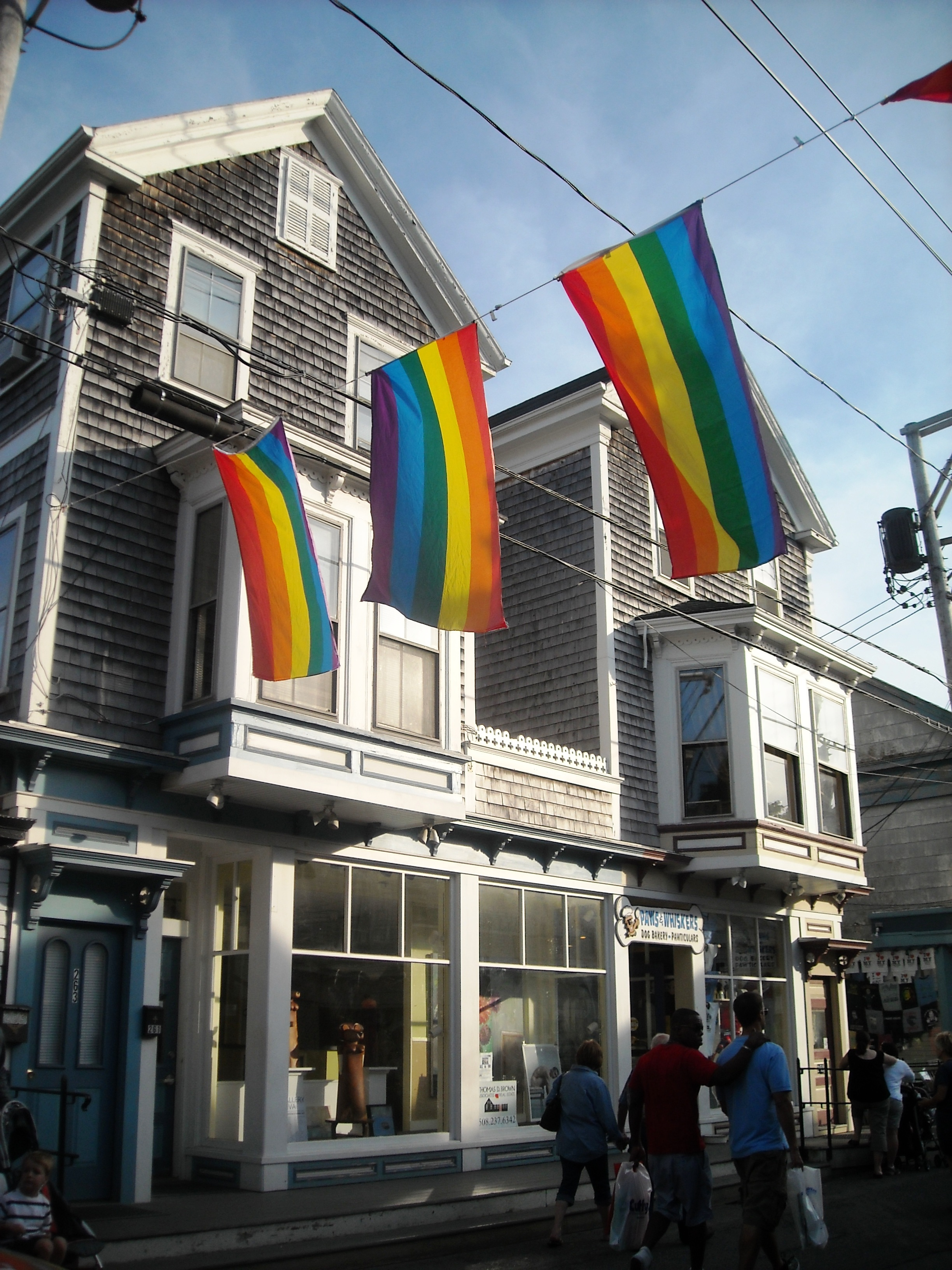
Commercial Street in Provincetown

Provincetown is the eastern terminus of U.S. Route 6, both in the state and in the nation. Although the terminus is directed east officially, geographically speaking, the road, having curved around Cape Cod, is facing west-southwest at the point, and is marked only by its junction with Route 6A. The state-controlled portion ends with a "State Highway Ends" sign as the road enters the Cape Cod National Seashore, after which the road is under federal maintenance. Route 6A passes through the town as well, mostly following Bradford Street (whereas US 6 originally followed Commercial Street before the bypass was built and Commercial Street was switched to one-way westbound), and ending just south of the Herring Cove Beach.

Provincetown is served by two seasonal ferries to Boston and one to Plymouth. They all dock at MacMillan Pier, located just east of the Town Hall in the center of town. When operating at full capacity, the pier accommodates in any given day: 11 ferry trips carrying over 5,000 passengers; five whale watch vessels each running up to three trips a day with a total capacity of 3,600 passengers; the town's commercial fishing fleet of 55 vessels; and many other excursion and visiting vessels. It also plays host several times per year as a destination port-of-call to passengers of organized cruise ship tours, whether themed towards the gay traveller, or towards eco-tourism, arts and other aspects of Provincetown and the outer cape.

The town has no rail service; the Provincetown Train Station opened to service by the Old Colony Railroad in 1873. The successor operator of the Old Colony lines, New York, New Haven and Hartford Railroad, served the station until 1938. (Service was briefly restored in 1940.) The line was formally abandoned in 1960. A large portion of the "road" later converted into three roads (Harry Kemp Way, Railroad Avenue and Rear Howland) plus the "Old Colony Nature Pathway", a 1.3-mile (2.1 km) pedestrian path and greenway.

The Cape Cod Regional Transit Authority offers flex route buses between MacMillan Pier and Harwich and a shuttle to Truro. Plymouth & Brockton Street Railway and Peter Pan Bus Lines provide daily bus service to Hyannis Transportation Center with connecting service to Boston, New York, and Providence and the Cape Flyer.

Provincetown is at one end of the scenic "Bike Route 1" from Boston called the Claire Saltonstall Bikeway. The town earned a Silver-level Bicycle Friendly Community Award from the League of American Bicyclists in 2018. Provincetown has the highest rate of year-round bicycle commuters in the state, at 14%, according to the PeopleForBikes City Ratings.

The Provincetown Municipal Airport is located just east of Race Point. This 378 acres (1.53 km^{2}) airport is surrounded by the Cape Cod National Seashore, and is used for general aviation as well as regular scheduled service to Boston and White Plains, New York. Cape Cod Air ended off-season (November to mid-May) private airline service in November 2024. The airport has a single 3,500-foot (1,100 m) runway, an ILS approach, and full lighting. The nearest national and international service is from Logan International Airport in Boston.

== Notable people ==
- Murray Bartlett (born 1971), actor
- Anthony Bourdain (1956–2018), chef, author, television host
- Alice Brock (1941–2024), subject of Arlo Guthrie's 1966 song "Alice's Restaurant"
- Walter P. Chrysler Jr. (1909–1988), art collector, museum founder
- Barry Clifford (born 1945), underwater explorer, discovered Whydah Galley pirate ship
- Kate Clinton (born 1947), comedian, writer
- Robert Duffy (born 1954), co-founder of Marc Jacobs fashion line
- Alan Emtage (born 1964), internet pioneer, photographer
- Judy Gold (born 1962), stand-up comedian
- Zach Goode (born 1970) lead singer of Smash Mouth
- Al Jaffee (1921–2023), cartoonist for MAD Magazine, famous for the Mad Fold-In
- Donald B. MacMillan (1874–1970), arctic explorer
- Howard Mitcham (1917–1996), artist, poet, cook
- Jason Moore (born 1970), director
- William Emery Nickerson (1853–1930), inventor with The Gillette Company; namesake of Nickerson Field
- Mary Oliver (1935–2019), poet
- Sarah Peake (born 1957), state representative for the Democratic Party (United States), 4th Barnstable District
- Susan J. Swift Steele (1822–1895), social reformer
- Ruth Marie Terry (1936–c. 1974), murder victim discovered in 1974, known as Lady of the Dunes until her identification in 2022
- Prescott Townsend (1894–1973), early LGBT activist
- John Waters (born 1946), filmmaker of Hairspray, Serial Mom, Pink Flamingos
- Frances L. Whedon (1902–1998), meteorologist, US Army
- Channing Wilroy (born 1940), actor, Dreamlander

=== Writers and journalists ===
- Louise Bryant (1885–1936), journalist, author
- Michael Cunningham (born 1952), Pulitzer Prize-winning author of The Hours
- Pat de Groot (1930–2018), English-born American painter
- Mark Doty (born 1953), poet, author
- David Drake (born 1963), Obie Award-winning playwright, stage director
- Susan Glaspell (1876–1948), Pulitzer Prize-winning playwright, author
- Frank X. Gaspar (unknown), poet, author
- Harry Kemp (1883–1960), "poet of the dunes", author of Tramping on Life and More Miles
- Stanley Kunitz (1905–2006), former United States Poet Laureate in 1974, and then again in 2000
- Ryan Landry (unknown), playwright, painter
- Norman Mailer (1923–2007), Pulitzer Prize-winning author, co-founder of The Village Voice
- William J. Mann (born 1963), author, historian
- Cookie Mueller (1949–1989), writer, performer, Dreamlander
- Ryan Murphy (born 1965), television screenwriter, director, producer
- Eugene O'Neill (1888–1953), Pulitzer Prize and Nobel Prize-winning author
- Mary Oliver (1935–2019), Pulitzer Prize-winning poet
- Mark Protosevich (born 1961), screenwriter of The Cell, I Am Legend, Poseidon
- John Reed (1887–1920), journalist, poet, communist activist
- Andrew Sullivan (born 1963), author, writer, blogger
- Andy Towle (unknown), poet, writer, founder of Towleroad.com
- Kurt Vonnegut (1922–2007), Hugo Award-winning author
- Mary Heaton Vorse (1874–1976), journalist, labor activist, social critic, novelist
- Tennessee Williams (1911–1983), Pulitzer Prize-winning playwright

=== Visual artists ===
- Nela Arias-Misson (1915–2015), abstract expressionist painter, sculptor
- Max Bohm (1868–1923), artist
- Edwin Dickinson (1891–1978), painter, draftsman
- Helen Frankenthaler (1928–2011), abstract expressionist painter
- Ada Gilmore (1883–1955), watercolorist, printmaker, one of the Provincetown Printers
- Nanno de Groot (1913–1963), belonged to the New York School abstract expressionist artists of the 1950s
- Marsden Hartley (1877–1943), American Modernist painter, poet, essayist
- Charles Webster Hawthorne (1872–1930), painter, founder of the Cape Cod School of Art
- Henry Hensche (1899–1992), painter, teacher
- Hans Hofmann (1880–1966), painter, artist, teacher
- Edward Hopper (1882–1967), American realist painter, printmaker
- Candy Jernigan (1952–1991), artist, graphic designer, set designer
- Franz Kline (1910–1962), abstract expressionist painter
- Karl Knaths (1891–1971), artist
- Willem de Kooning (1904–1997), abstract expressionist artist
- Blanche Lazzell (1878–1956), painter, printmaker, designer
- Herman Maril (1908–1986), artist, emeritus professor of painting at University of Maryland
- Joel Meyerowitz (born 1938), photographer
- Ross Moffett (1888–1971), artist
- George Morrison (1919–2000), Ojibwe painter, sculptor
- Robert Motherwell (1915–1991), abstract expressionist painter, printmaker, editor
- Lillian Orlowsky (1914–2004), American Modernist artist
- Anne Packard (born 1933), artist
- Fritz Pfeiffer (1889–1960), artist
- Mark Rothko (1903–1970), artist closely associated with the abstract expressionist movement
- Selina Trieff (1934–2015), artist, painter
- Jack Tworkov (1900–1982), abstract expressionist painter
- Ferol Sibley Warthen (1890–1986), painter, printmaker
- Agnes Weinrich (1873–1946), artist interesting early on in modernist, abstract, and cubist styles
- Edith Lake Wilkinson (1868–1957), artist
- Martha Dewing Woodward (1856–1950), created Provincetown's first summer art school in 1896

== Provincetown in popular culture ==
Provincetown features in the following productions:

- Tough Guys Don't Dance (1987)
- Hightown (2020–2024)
- American Horror Story: Double Feature (2021)
- Bros (2022)
- High Tide (2024)
- Tony (2026)
