= North Eastham, Massachusetts =

- Census-designated place
- Location in Barnstable County and the state of Massachusetts.
- Coordinates: 41°51′5″N 70°00′00″W
- Country: United States
- State: Massachusetts
- County: Barnstable
- Town: Eastham

Area
  - Total: 11.95 sq mi (30.96 km^{2})
  - Land: 3.44 sq mi (8.92 km^{2})
  - Water: 8.51 sq mi (22.04 km^{2})
- Elevation: 39 ft (12 m)

Population (2020)
  - Total: 2,296
  - Density: 667/sq mi (257.5/km^{2})
- Time zone: UTC-5 (Eastern (EST))
  - Summer (DST): UTC-4 (EDT)
- ZIP Codes: 02651 (North Eastham); 02642 (Eastham)
- Area code: 508
- FIPS code: 25-47590
- GNIS feature ID: 0616892

North Eastham is a census-designated place (CDP) in the town of Eastham in Barnstable County, Massachusetts, United States. As of the 2020 census, North Eastham had a population of 2,296.

== Geography ==
North Eastham is located within the northwestern part of the Town of Eastham at 41°51′05″N 70°00′00″W (41.851349, −69.999928). It is bordered to the west by Cape Cod Bay, to the north by the town of Wellfleet, to the east by U.S. Route 6 and Great Pond Road, and to the south by Great Pond, Herring Brook Road, and Samoset Road.

According to the United States Census Bureau, the CDP has a total area of 11.9 square miles (30.9 km^{2}), of which 3.4 square miles (8.9 km^{2}) is land and 8.5 square miles (22.0 km^{2}) (71.24%) is water.

== Demographics ==
Historical population
Census	Pop.	Note	%±
2020	2,296		—
U.S. Decennial Census

=== 2020 census ===
As of the 2020 census, North Eastham had a population of 2,296. The median age was 60.0 years. 11.8% of residents were under the age of 18 and 39.6% of residents were 65 years of age or older. For every 100 females there were 92.6 males, and for every 100 females age 18 and over there were 88.8 males age 18 and over.

100.0% of residents lived in urban areas, while 0.0% lived in rural areas.

There were 1,112 households in North Eastham, of which 14.8% had children under the age of 18 living in them. Of all households, 43.8% were married-couple households, 19.3% were households with a male householder and no spouse or partner present, and 31.4% were households with a female householder and no spouse or partner present. About 35.8% of all households were made up of individuals and 23.5% had someone living alone who was 65 years of age or older.

There were 2,839 housing units, of which 60.8% were vacant. The homeowner vacancy rate was 0.3% and the rental vacancy rate was 24.2%.

Racial composition as of the 2020 census
Race	Number	Percent
White	2,076	90.4%
Black or African American	60	2.6%
American Indian and Alaska Native	3	0.1%
Asian	12	0.5%
Native Hawaiian and Other Pacific Islander	0	0.0%
Some other race	17	0.7%
Two or more races	128	5.6%
Hispanic or Latino (of any race)	53	2.3%

=== 2000 census ===
At the 2000 census there were 1,915 people, 881 households, and 570 families in the CDP. The population density was 217.5/km^{2} (562.4/mi^{2}). There were 2,656 housing units at an average density of 301.6/km^{2} (780.1/mi^{2}). The racial makeup of the CDP was 98.12% White, 0.26% African American, 0.16% Native American, 0.42% Asian, 0.05% Pacific Islander, 0.05% from other races, and 0.94% from two or more races. Hispanic or Latino of any race were 0.84%.

== Education ==
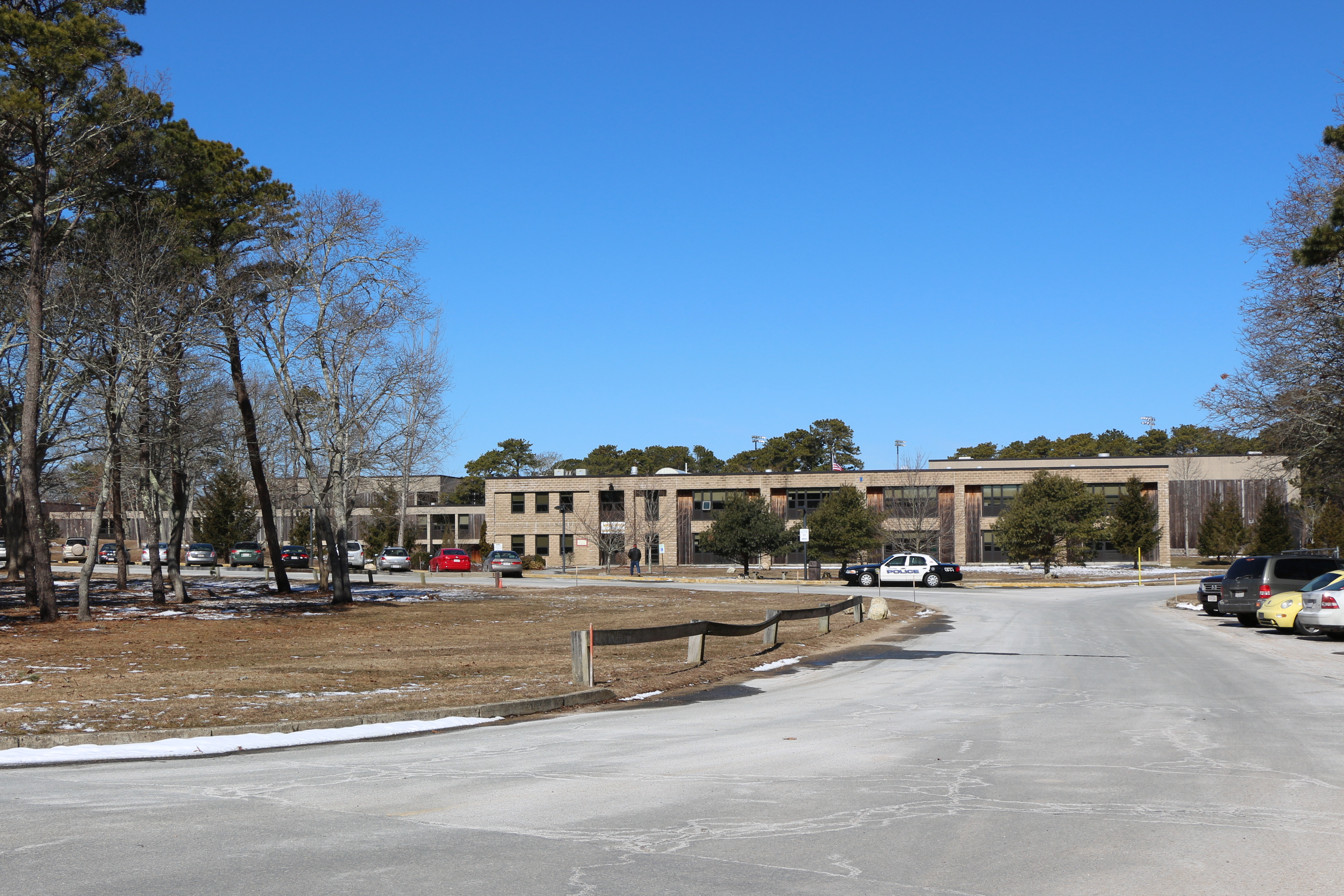
Nauset Regional High School

Nauset Public Schools serves the community.

Nauset Regional High School is the area high school.

== See also ==
- French Cable Hut
