= Nick Minnerath =

American basketball player (born 1988)

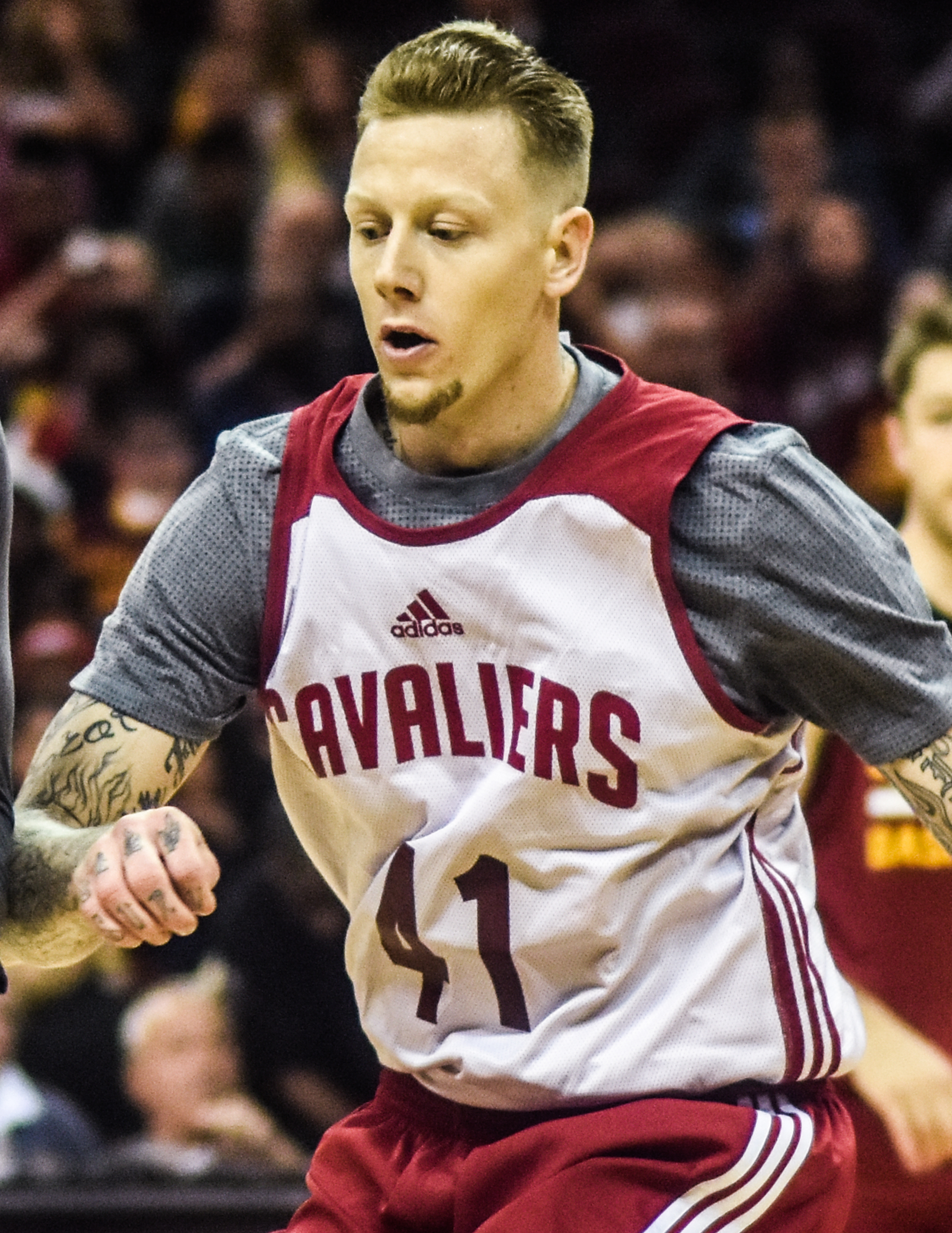
- Minnerath with the Cleveland Cavaliers in 2015

Personal information
- Born: August 11, 1988 (age 38) Cody, Wyoming, U.S.
- Listed height: 6 ft 9 in (2.06 m)
- Listed weight: 215 lb (98 kg)

Career information
- High school: Nauset (North Eastham, Massachusetts)
- College: Jackson (2008–2010); Detroit Mercy (2010–2013)
- NBA draft: 2013: undrafted
- Playing career: 2013–2024
- Position: Power forward

Career history
- 2013–2014: Obradoiro CAB
- 2014: STB Le Havre
- 2014–2015: Cholet Basket
- 2015–2016: Canton Charge
- 2016–2017: Avtodor Saratov
- 2017–2018: Shanghai Sharks
- 2018: Xinjiang Flying Tigers
- 2019: Leones de Ponce
- 2019–2020: Seoul Samsung Thunders
- 2020–2021: Seoul SK Knights
- 2021–2024: Shabab Al Ahli

Career highlights
- UAE League champion (2023); 2× UAE President's Cup champion (2022, 2023); UAE League champion (2022); BSN First Team (2019); Basketball Champions League Top Scorer (2017); All-VTB United League First Team (2017); VTB United League scoring champion (2017); VTB United League All-Star (2017); All-NBA D-League Second Team (2016); First-team All-Horizon League (2013); Third-team NJCAA D2 All-American (2010)
- Stats at Basketball Reference

Nicolas Lake Scott Minnerath (born August 11, 1988) is an American former professional basketball player He played college basketball for Jackson Community College and the University of Detroit Mercy.

== High school career ==
Minnerath attended Nauset Regional High School in North Eastham, Massachusetts. After playing sparingly as a junior, just two games into his senior year, he broke his leg and missed the rest of the season.

== College career ==
In his freshman season at Jackson Community College, Minnerath finished runner-up in the Western Conference's Player of the Year award after averaging 22.8 points and 9.1 rebounds, including setting the school record with 42 points in a game against Kirkland C.C. Minnerath made 15 2-pointers and 4 3-pointers in the victory.

In his sophomore season, he finished 19th in the nation in points per game (21.0), 16th in free throw percentage (82%) and 15th in blocks per game (2.24). A 1,000-point scorer at the JUCO level, he also earned back-to-back Michigan Community College Athletic Association (MCCAA) All-Region honors as well as first team All-Western Conference accolades. He capped off an impressive two-year career at Jackson by being named a NJCAA Division II third team All-American.

In 2010, he transferred to Detroit Mercy where he started every game in his first year, finishing the 2010–11 season with a hot stretch, as he had six 20-point games starting on January 1, 2011. In 33 games, he averaged 11.2 points and 4.8 rebounds in 27.6 minutes per game.

Minnerath redshirted his senior year after playing just five games before a knee injury ended his season. In those five games, he averaged 12.0 points and 4.0 rebounds in 23.2 minutes per game.

In his redshirted senior season, he was named to the 2013 All-Horizon League first team. He was also named to the NABC District 12 second team and was one of 64 outgoing seniors to be invited to the 2013 Portsmouth Invitational Tournament. In 33 games, he averaged 14.6 points, 5.9 rebounds and 1.0 assists in 29.6 minutes per game.

== Professional career ==
=== Obradoiro (2013–2014) ===
After going undrafted in the 2013 NBA draft, Minnerath joined the Sacramento Kings for the 2013 NBA Summer League. On August 30, 2013, he signed with Obradoiro CAB of Spain for the 2013–14 season. On January 13, 2014, he parted ways with Obradoiro. In 15 games, he averaged 6.0 points, 2.2 rebounds and 0.2 assists per game.

=== Le Havre (2014) ===
On January 14, 2014, Minnerath signed with STB Le Havre of France for the rest of the season. In 15 games, he averaged 11.9 points, 2.1 rebounds and 1.0 assists per game.

=== Cholet Basket (2014–2015) ===
In July 2014, Minnerath joined the Brooklyn Nets for the 2014 NBA Summer League. On July 25, 2014, he signed with Cholet Basket for the 2014–15 season. In 34 games, he averaged 13.6 points, 4.1 rebounds and 0.6 assists per game.

=== Cleveland Cavaliers / Canton Charge (2015–2016) ===
On September 28, 2015, Minnerath signed with the Cleveland Cavaliers. However, he was later waived by the Cavaliers on October 22 after appearing in three preseason games. On October 30, he was acquired by the Canton Charge of the NBA Development League as an affiliate player of the Cavaliers. On November 14, he made his debut for the Charge in a 106–99 loss to the Maine Red Claws, recording 17 points, 10 rebounds and one block in 38 minutes. At the season's end, he was named to the All-NBA D-League Second Team after playing in 49 games and averaging 18.5 points on .508 shooting and 6.9 rebounds in 29.9 minutes per game, helping the Charge tie a franchise record 31 wins.

=== Avtodor Saratov (2016–2017) ===
On July 15, 2016, Minnerath signed with the Russian team Avtodor Saratov. Minnerath had an outstanding scoring season, as he was crowned the VTB United League Scoring Champion, after averaging 23.3 points per game during the 2016–17 season. To go along with this accomplishment, he was also the scoring leader of the European-wide 3rd-tier level Basketball Champions League's 2016–17 season, with an average of 20.3 points per game.

=== Shanghai Sharks (2017–2018) ===
On July 18, 2017, Minnerath signed with the Shanghai Sharks of the Chinese Basketball Association. Minnerath with Jimmer Fredette (other American import) led the Sharks to the playoffs. They were defeated by the Beijing Ducks in the first round. Minnerath was one of top two players in points scored per minute. He averaged 27.9 points in 29 minutes of play. He shot .490 from 2 point area, an eye popping 46% from three, and .873 from the line. Minnerath also led team in rebounds with 8.5 per game. Very successful first year in China for Minnerath.

=== Xinjiang Flying Tigers (2018) ===
On November 15, 2018, Minnerath was reported to have signed with Xinjiang Flying Tigers. Minnerath left Xinjiang-Flying-Tigers of the CBA in December of his own choice to play in BSN in Puerto Rico. This allowed him to be closer to his new child in Florida.

=== Leones de Ponce (2019) ===
On January 12, 2019, Minnerath was reported to have signed with Leones de Ponce [Baloncesto Superior National] (BSN). Minnerath was a first team All-Star for the BSN. He also was the league's leading scorer with an average of 21.9 points per game. On July 16, 2019, he officially signed with the Seoul Samsung Thunders of the KBL (Korean Basketball League).

=== Seoul Samsung Thunders (2019–2020) ===
Minnerath signed with Seoul Samsung Thunders of the Korean Basketball League (KBL) last July 16, 2019. He quickly became one of best new players in the competitive league. Minnerath led team with averaging 21 points and 6 rebounds per game. He was second leading scorer in the league. The worldwide pandemic COVID-19 ended the league about a month early. Minnerath played all teams 43 games. He was named player of week a few times and top 5 players in round 4 {last round of 10 games}. Minnerath shot 61% from the 2 point floor and 84% from the line. Unable to finish season there were no playoffs this year. South Korea, like all other Basketball was not able to finish their seasons. South Korea was able to play most of their regular season games compared to most leagues. Minnerath had another great year playing in the new country of South Korea for him. Once again showing he is one of the game's most high caliber offensive players. Korean League called the season on March 27, 2020.

=== Seoul SK Knights (2020–2021) ===
Minnerath signed with Seoul SK Knights of the Korean Basketball League (KBL) on June 8, 2020. He averaged 13.4 points and 4.3 rebounds per game. Minnerath was Korean Basketball league leader with points per minute (PPM). He led the league averaging .9 points per minute played (13.4 points in 15.0 minutes played).

=== Shabab Al Ahli (2021–2024) ===
On September 6, 2021, Minnerath signed with Shabab Al Ahli of the UAE National Basketball League.

Shabab Al Ahli won the league championship on March 23, 2022, by defeating Al Sharjah by a score of 75–63. Shabab Al Ahli finished the season by winning the “Triple Crown” by winning both the President's Cup and the Vice President's Cup. Minnerath led his team averaging over 20 points per game and 9 rebounds. He resigned for the 2022–2023 with Shabab Al Ahli. Minnerath once again had a great year in a different part of the world as his career continues to flourish.

Shabab Al Ahli won the league championship for 2023 on April 29 by defeating Al Nasar. The team once again won the coveted President's Cup. No Vice President's Cup was played in 2023. Minnerath once again averaged over 20 points and 8 rebounds for the year in the United Arab Emirates Basketball League. Minnerath had the league high of 41 points on April 15, 2023, against Al Nasar. Shabab Al Ahli also won the right to play in the West Asia Super League where they made the playoffs. Minnerath won the scoring champion of the WASL regular season with 25.8 points per game. Minnerath signed with Shabab Al Ahli for the 2023-24 year on May 25, 2023.

== Personal ==
Minnerath is the son of Marie Scott and Michael Minnerath, the latter a Cape Cod National Seashore Ranger, and has a twin sister named Jessica.

Minnerath married Valeria "Lera" Kulikuskaya on January 2, 2015. She is a tennis player from Belarus. They have a 4-year-old son named Miles.

Minnerath and his wife Valeria "Lera" had a baby daughter named Mila born on April 8, 2023.
