= Truro, Massachusetts =

- Town
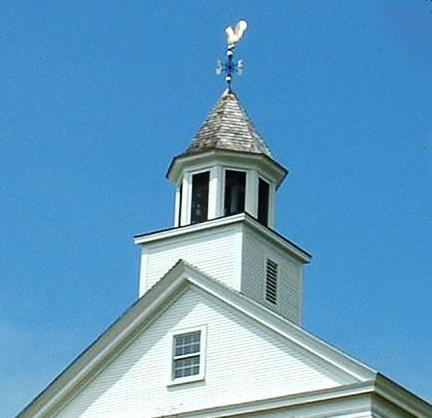
- Truro Town Hall

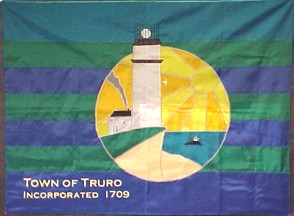
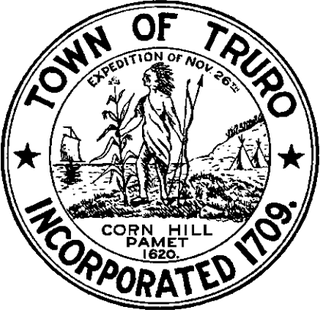
- Flag Seal

- Location in Barnstable County and the Commonwealth of Massachusetts.
- Coordinates: 41°59′36″N 70°03′01″W
- Country: United States
- State: Massachusetts
- County: Barnstable
- Settled: 1700
- Incorporated: 1709

Government
  - Type: Open town meeting
  - Town Administrator: Kelly Sullivan-Clark

Area
  - Total: 26.3 sq mi (68.2 km^{2})
  - Land: 21.0 sq mi (54.5 km^{2})
  - Water: 5.3 sq mi (13.6 km^{2})
- Elevation: 26 ft (8 m)

Population (2020)
  - Total: 2,454
  - Density: 120/sq mi (45/km^{2})
- Time zone: UTC−5 (Eastern)
  - Summer (DST): UTC−4 (Eastern)
- ZIP Codes: 02652 (North Truro); 02666 (Truro)
- Area code: 508
- FIPS code: 25-70605
- GNIS feature ID: 0618260
- Website: truro-ma.gov

Truro (/ˈtrɜːroʊ/) is a town on Cape Cod in Massachusetts, comprising two villages: Truro and North Truro. Located slightly more than 100 miles (160 km) by road from Boston, it is a summer vacation community just south of the northern tip of Cape Cod, in an area known as the "Outer Cape". English colonists named it after Truro in Cornwall, United Kingdom.

The historic Wampanoag Native American people called the area Pamet or Payomet. Their language was part of the large Algonquian family. This name was adopted for the Pamet River and the harbor area around the town center known as the Pamet Roads. The population of Truro was 2,454 at the 2020 census.

Over half of the land area of the town is part of the Cape Cod National Seashore, established in 1961 by President John F. Kennedy, and administered by the U.S. National Park Service.

== History ==
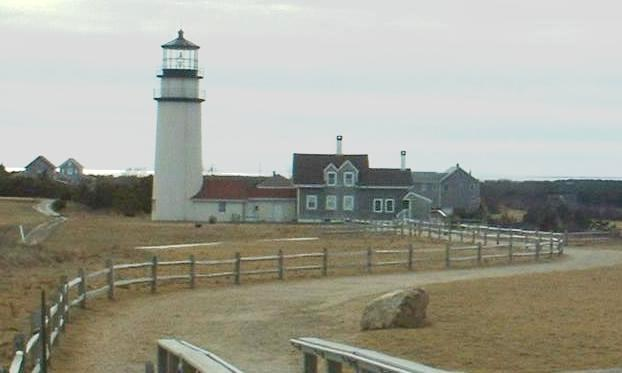
Highland Light. The original site is marked by a boulder in the foreground.

Cape Cod was the territory of successive cultures of indigenous peoples for thousands of years before Europeans arrived. At the time of English colonization, the Wampanoag tribe was the dominant one on Cape Cod, numbering about 7,000 by early accounts. They used the cape and its waters for hunting, fishing and gathering shellfish. They also cultivated maize to supplement their diets and to store for winter eating.

The English Pilgrims stopped in Truro and Provincetown in 1620 as their original choice for a landing before later deciding the area to be unsuitable. While there, they discovered fresh water and corn stored by the Wampanoag. Historians debate the accuracy of the account about the latter discovery, but in popular lore it led to the place being called Corn Hill.

Truro was settled by English immigrant colonists in the 1690s as the northernmost portion of the town of Eastham. The town was officially separated and incorporated in 1709. Fishing, whaling and shipbuilding made up the town's early industry. These industries had to shift to other locations as the harsh tides of the Lower Cape reduced the town's main port in the 1850s. In the late 19th and early 20th century, Cape Cod was a popular location for artists because of its light.

Today, Truro is one of the more exclusive towns on the Cape, noted for its affluent residences and the rolling hills and dunes along the coast. Truro is the site of the Highland Light (also known as the Cape Cod Light), the earliest lighthouse on Cape Cod. The first building was erected in 1797; the current lighthouse was built in 1857. The entire 430-ton light was moved about 1/10 of a mile inland in 1996. By then, because of erosion, its original site was just ten yards from the edge of the shore cliffs.

The old town cemetery was the location of the murders in 1969 of Susan Perry, Patricia Walsh, Sydney Monzon and Mary Anna Wysocki by Tony Costa.

== Geography ==
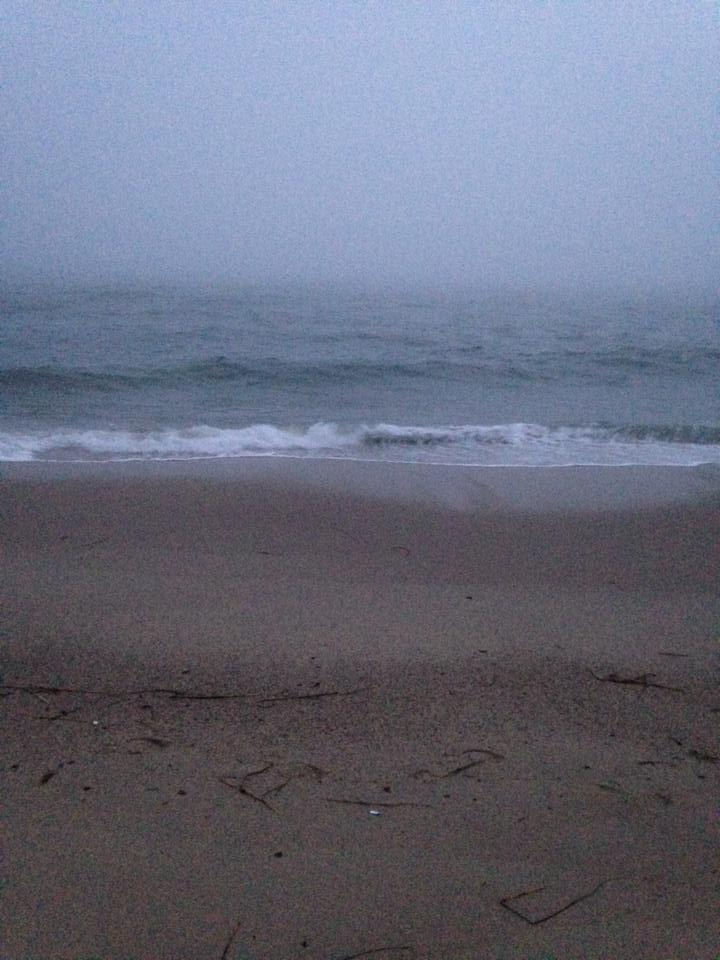
Tideline in North Truro, MA

According to the United States Census Bureau, the town has a total area of 26.3 square miles (68 km^{2}), of which 21.0 square miles (54 km^{2}) is land and 5.3 square miles (14 km^{2}) (20.02%) is water. Truro is located just south and east of the "tip" of Cape Cod, and is bordered by Provincetown to the northwest, the Atlantic Ocean to the north and east, Wellfleet to the south, and Cape Cod Bay to the west. The town is thirty-eight miles by road to Barnstable, fifty miles from the Sagamore Bridge and 105 miles by road from Boston.

The topography generally slopes downward from the Atlantic to Cape Cod Bay, and from south to north. There are several small ponds throughout town, all of which combined are smaller than the Pilgrim Lake, just east of the Provincetown town line, and just south of the sand dunes which make up most of the northern tip of the Cape. Pamet Harbor, a small inlet, is in the southern half of the town on the Cape Cod Bay side, and leads to the Pamet River. Just south of the lighthouse is a Coast Guard radar station, equipped with a Doppler radar tower, close to the nearby Jenny Lind Tower.

== Climate ==
The town of Truro has a mild summer Humid continental climate (Dfb). The plant hardiness zone is 7a, with an average annual extreme minimum air temperature of 4.0 °F (−15.6 °C). The average seasonal (Nov–Apr) snowfall total is around 30 in (76 cm). The average snowiest month is February, which corresponds to the annual peak in nor'easter activity.

Climate data for Truro, Barnstable County, Massachusetts (1981–2010 averages).
Month	Jan	Feb	Mar	Apr	May	Jun	Jul	Aug	Sep	Oct	Nov	Dec	Year
Mean daily maximum °F (°C)	38.5 (3.6)	39.6 (4.2)	44.7 (7.1)	53.7 (12.1)	62.9 (17.2)	73.4 (23.0)	79.4 (26.3)	78.0 (25.6)	71.5 (21.9)	61.9 (16.6)	53.0 (11.7)	44.4 (6.9)	58.5 (14.7)
Daily mean °F (°C)	31.8 (−0.1)	32.9 (0.5)	37.9 (3.3)	46.5 (8.1)	55.3 (12.9)	65.2 (18.4)	71.4 (21.9)	70.6 (21.4)	64.3 (17.9)	54.7 (12.6)	46.2 (7.9)	37.4 (3.0)	51.3 (10.7)
Mean daily minimum °F (°C)	25.1 (−3.8)	26.2 (−3.2)	31.0 (−0.6)	39.2 (4.0)	47.8 (8.8)	56.9 (13.8)	63.4 (17.4)	63.2 (17.3)	57.0 (13.9)	47.5 (8.6)	39.4 (4.1)	30.3 (−0.9)	44.0 (6.7)
Average precipitation inches (mm)	3.73 (95)	3.23 (82)	4.35 (110)	4.21 (107)	3.32 (84)	3.54 (90)	2.86 (73)	3.68 (93)	3.59 (91)	4.09 (104)	4.36 (111)	3.87 (98)	44.83 (1,139)
Average relative humidity (%)	68.2	66.9	66.7	67.7	70.3	71.6	73.8	74.2	74.4	70.0	67.9	66.6	69.9
Source: PRISM Climate Group

Monthly average dewpoints
Month	Jan	Feb	Mar	Apr	May	Jun	Jul	Aug	Sep	Oct	Nov	Dec	Year
Average dew point °F	22.5	23.1	27.8	36.4	45.8	55.8	62.6	62.0	56.0	45.1	36.2	27.3	41.8
Average dew point °C	−5.3	−4.9	−2.3	2.4	7.7	13.2	17.0	16.7	13.3	7.3	2.3	−2.6	5.4
Source = PRISM Climate Group

== Demographics ==
Historical population
Year	Pop.	±%
1790	1,193	—
1850	2,051	+71.9%
1860	1,583	−22.8%
1870	1,269	−19.8%
1880	1,017	−19.9%
1890	919	−9.6%
1900	767	−16.5%
1910	655	−14.6%
1920	554	−15.4%
1930	513	−7.4%
1940	585	+14.0%
1950	661	+13.0%
1960	1,002	+51.6%
1970	1,234	+23.2%
1980	1,486	+20.4%
1990	1,573	+5.9%
2000	2,087	+32.7%
2010	2,003	−4.0%
2020	2,454	+22.5%
2023*	2,479	+1.0%
* = population estimate. Source: United States census records and Population Estimates Program data.

As of the census of 2000, there were 2,087 people, 907 households, and 515 families residing in the town. The population density was 99.1 inhabitants per square mile (38.3/km^{2}). There were 2,551 housing units at an average density of 121.2 per square mile (46.8/km^{2}). The racial makeup of the town was 95.11% White, 1.87% African American, 0.43% Native American, 0.38% Asian, 0.10% Pacific Islander, 0.77% from other races, and 1.34% from two or more races. Hispanic or Latino of any race were 1.15% of the population.

There were 907 households, out of which 21.2% had children under the age of 18 living with them, 46.3% were married couples living together, 7.9% had a female householder with no husband present, and 43.2% were non-families. 32.0% of all households were made up of individuals, and 12.5% had someone living alone who was 65 years of age or older. The average household size was 2.18 and the average family size was 2.76.

In the town, the population was spread out, with 17.4% under the age of 18, 4.1% from 18 to 24, 27.2% from 25 to 44, 34.4% from 45 to 64, and 17.0% who were 65 years of age or older. The median age was 46 years. For every 100 females, there were 86.5 males. For every 100 females age 18 and over, there were 84.7 males.

The median income for a household in the town was $42,981, and the median income for a family was $51,389. Males had a median income of $37,208 versus $30,435 for females. The per capita income for the town was $22,608. About 4.8% of families and 11.2% of the population were below the poverty line, including 8.5% of those under age 18 and 10.3% of those age 65 or over.

== Government ==
Truro is represented in the Massachusetts House of Representatives as a part of the Fourth Barnstable district, which includes (with the exception of Brewster) all the towns east and north of Harwich on the Cape. The seat is held by Democrat Hadley Luddy. The town is represented in the Massachusetts Senate as a part of the Cape and Islands District, which includes all of Cape Cod, Martha's Vineyard and Nantucket except the towns of Bourne, Falmouth, and Sandwich. The Senate seat is held by Democrat Julian Cyr.

On the national level, Truro is a part of Massachusetts's 9th congressional district, and is currently represented by Bill Keating. The state's senior member of the United States Senate is Elizabeth Warren (elected in 2012); the state's junior Senate member, elected in 2014, is Edward Markey.

Like most small incorporated communities in New England, Truro uses an open town meeting form of government, led by a Town Manager and a Board of Selectmen. The town has its own police and fire departments, headquartered on US Route 6 just south of the MA Route 6A split. The town has two post offices: one for Truro proper (02666), located on Truro Center Road, and one for the village of North Truro (02652), located on Shore Road (MA Route 6A). The town's Public Library is located between the two routes in a secluded spot, leading to the nickname, "The Library In The Woods."

=== Opposition to development ===
Through town meeting, as well as the town's Planning Board and the Cape Cod Commission, some Truro residents have made considerable, and often successful, efforts to prevent development projects which they perceive to threaten the town's character. They opposed a proposed Stop & Shop grocery store and the WTUR/WCDJ/WGTX communication tower. The latter project was finally built in 2007, almost 20 years after the station was first licensed.

== Education ==
Truro operates the Truro Central School for students from pre-kindergarten through eighth grade. The town does not have its own high school; a tuition agreement is in place with Nauset Regional High School to send its students there. Cape Cod Times states that normally Nauset secondary schools are the destinations of students above grade 6. Formerly Truro residents had the option of going to Provincetown High School. Provincetown High School ended operations after 2013.

There are no private schools anywhere on the lower Cape; high school students additionally have the option of attending the Cape Cod Regional Technical High School in Harwich, Monomoy Regional High School In Harwich, or students can attend Sturgis Charter school In Hyannis.

There are private scholarships for students from Truro and Provincetown: the John Anderson Francis Family Scholarship Fund and the Captain Joseph F. Oliver Scholarship Fund. c. 2019 each year the number of applicants ranged from 6–10, a figure the organizers consider to be low.

The Truro Public Library is a center of community activity. The library has a puppet theater performance. The outside of the facility has a pavilion. Cynthia McCormick of Cape Cod Times described it as "a home away from home for parents".

== Transportation ==
Two state-maintained routes serve Truro. U.S. Route 6 (US 6) is the main route through town, traveling through the town from south to north-northwest on its way to Provincetown. The "second" portion of the Cape's Massachusetts Route 6A (MA Route 6A) begins in the town, splitting from US 6's current routing and then following the original path of US 6, which parallels the newer highway. MA Route 6A eventually enters Provincetown barely 250 feet (76 m) south of US 6. While both routes follow a primarily north-south trajectory within Truro, they are signed east-west to match the general direction of the full length of the routes.

There is no rail or air service in the town; the nearest regional airport is located in neighboring Provincetown. The nearest national and international air service can be found at Logan International Airport in Boston.

== Notable people ==
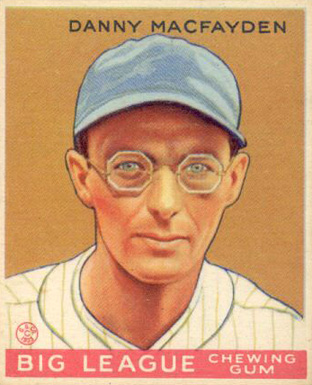
Boston Red Sox pitcher Danny MacFayden

- Marshall Ayres, pioneer of the American west
- Edward Knight Collins, 19th-century shipping magnate
- Lee Falk, writer
- L. Thomas Hopkins, education theorist
- Edward Hopper, artist
- Patty Larkin, singer-songwriter
- Lucy L'Engle, artist
- Danny MacFayden, Major League Baseball pitcher
- Nick Minnerath, professional basketball player
- Steve Nelson, political activist and veteran of the Spanish Civil War
- Anthony Perkins, American actor
- Josh Taves, American football defensive end

== Truro in popular culture and art ==
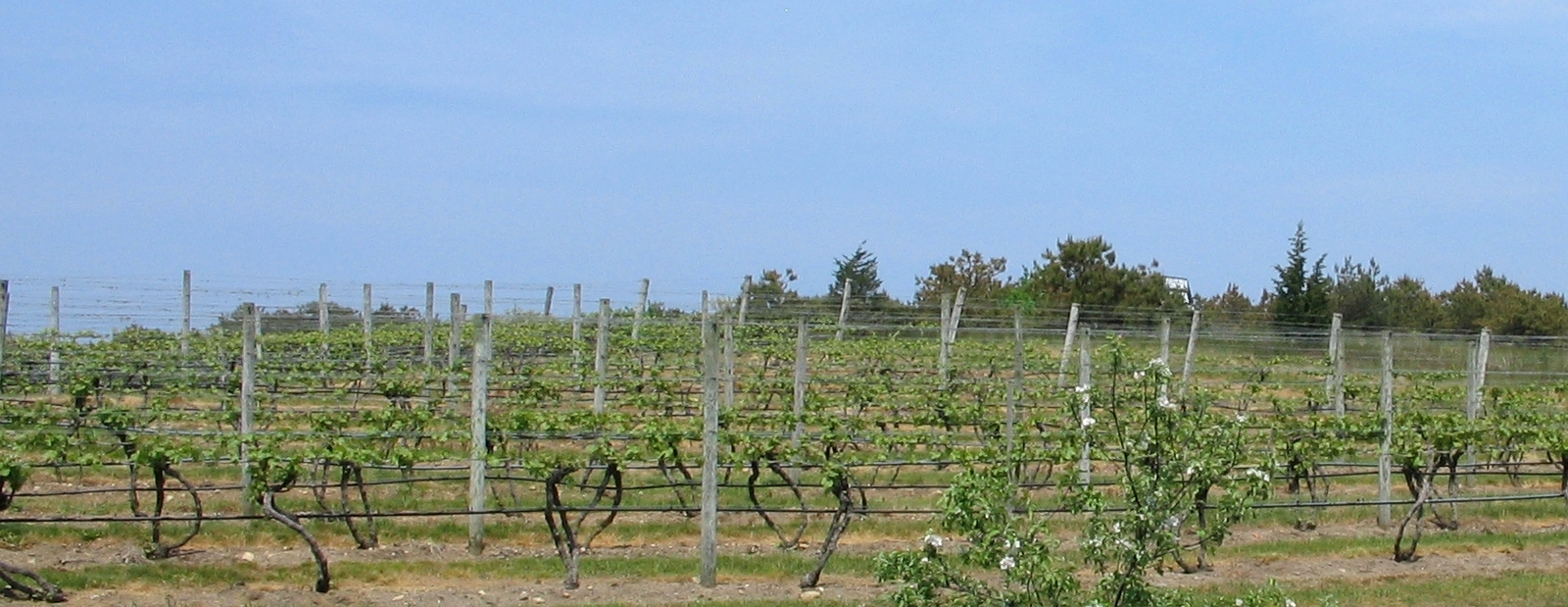
The Truro Vineyards in North Truro

Artist Edward Hopper owned a summer house in Truro, and painted numerous Truro scenes including Corn Hill (1930), Highland Light, North Truro (1930), and Cottages at North Truro (1936).

The first film in the Men In Black series displayed Truro on a satellite map, but the map zoomed in on Sandwich, a town at the opposite end of Cape Cod. In Men in Black II (2002), Truro was the town to which Tommy Lee Jones' character "Agent K" retired, becoming a postal worker. The post office was represented as a solitary building in the middle of nowhere, and was portrayed by the Fire Island Lighthouse on Fire Island, New York. In contrast, Truro's post office is in the heart of "downtown" Truro, which is also the location of a small convenience store and a few shops.

== Shipwrecks ==
Off Head of the Meadow beach on the Atlantic side of Truro lies the wreck of the three-masted barque Frances. The Hamburg-based ship wrecked off Truro on December 27, 1872, while on her way from the Far East to Boston. Usually submerged, the wreck will appear when weather and tides line up.

== See also ==
- Cape Cod National Seashore
- National Landmark of Soaring
