= L. Thomas Hopkins =

L. Thomas Hopkins (1889 in Truro, Massachusetts – 1982), was a progressive education theorist, consultant, and curriculum leader. He completed all of his major writings while he was a professor and the laboratory school director at the Teachers College, Columbia University. He received his bachelor's and master's degrees from Tufts University in 1910 and 1911 In 1922 he completed the Ed. D degree at Harvard University under the mentorship of professors Alexander Inglis and Walter Dearborn. After he finished at Harvard, he accepted a tenured position at the University of Colorado, Boulder. In 1929 Hopkins was invited to join the faculty of Teachers College, Columbia University as a professor of education. He stayed at Teachers College, Columbia University for the next 25 years. He retired from Teachers College in 1954. He was also a Fulbright scholar in Egypt from 1956-1957. He surveyed Italian schools in 1957 and taught at Wheelock College in Boston and at the University of Maine in the 1960s. In 1960 he chaired the committee on Schools and Moral Values for the White house Conference on Education. In 1971 he retired yet again but this time with his wife, Hester Hopkins, to Truro on Cape Cod. There he continued to write and speak. He completed his memoirs and organized his papers until right before he died in 1982. Until this day his papers are still located at the University of Colorado library in Boulder, Colorado.

Hopkins's major ideas are outlined in three of his numerous books. In Integration, Its Meaning and Application (1937), he argued, contrary to many current interpretations of integrated curriculum, that integration is much more than merely combining subject matter areas around a common theme (i.e., the thematic unit). In Interaction: The Democratic Process (1941), Hopkins incorporated a social dynamic to expand the idea of the development of the individual or personal organism. In the Emerging Self in School and Home (1954), Hopkins showed that education is not a function of schooling alone. In this book, he developed the image of an organic group, contrasting it with a mere aggregate group, to depict the integration of school, home, and community.

Hopkins takes what was called "was curriculum" and called it useless. He then said "is curriculum," and then went on to say "celebrates the experiential...deals with the whole pupil who develops through internal control of the learnings that he or she self-selects for personal growth." He explained the curriculum as what a student takes from a teacher and takes a better understanding of it to help them grow in higher maturity.
