= Nauset Regional High School =

Coordinates: 41°51′34.29″N 69°57′59.15″W

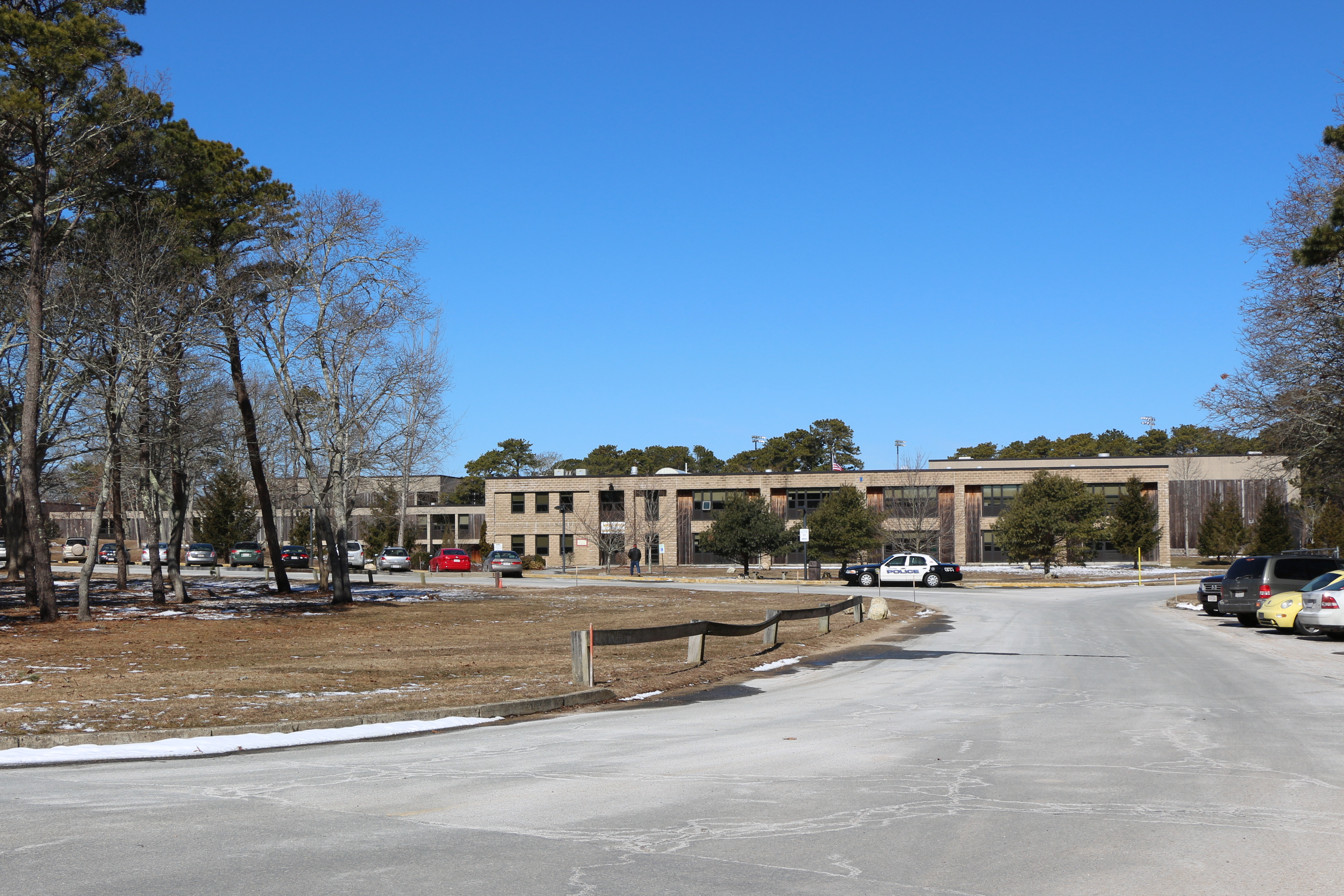

Location
- 100 Cable Road; North Eastham, Massachusetts; 02642; United States

Information
- Type: Public School; Open enrollment
- Established: 1972
- School district: Nauset Public Schools
- Superintendent: Glenn Brand
- Principal: Patrick Clark
- Teaching staff: 75.10 (FTE)
- Grades: 9-12
- Enrollment: 737 (2024–2025)
- Student to teacher ratio: 9.81
- Colors: Black & Gold
- Athletics conference: Cape and Islands League
- Mascot: Warrior
- Newspaper: Nauset Horizons
- Yearbook: Nauset Tides
- Towns Served: Brewster, Orleans, Eastham, Wellfleet, Truro, Provincetown
- Website: www.nausetschools.org/o/nrhs

Nauset Regional High School is an NEASC accredited high school located in Eastham, Massachusetts, United States and a part of Nauset Public Schools. Nauset is inside the Cape Cod National Seashore, making it the only high school on the East Coast located within a National Park. The open campus is situated about a half-mile from Nauset Light. Nauset's colors are Black and Gold and the school's mascot is the Warrior.

== History ==
Nauset is named after the Nauset people, a Native American tribe that lived on Cape Cod. Nauset High school serves students from the communities of Brewster, Orleans, Eastham, Wellfleet, Truro, and Provincetown. Nauset also offers an open enrollment program for students located in the towns of Dennis, Harwich and Chatham. Nauset's mascot is the Warrior and the schools colors are Black and Gold.

In 2010, the Provincetown School Board elected to shut down Provincetown High School by the end of the 2012–13 academic school year due to falling enrollment and lack of funds. By 2012 the 9th and 10th grade students at Provincetown were already moved to Nauset Regional.

In 2012 the school began starting classes at a later time.

In 2013 the school had 1,024 students, which was its highest level in the era. By 2020 it was down to 877. There was a decline of births in the area, and the new Cape Cod Regional Technical High School was attracting students away from Nauset Regional.

== Athletics ==
The Nauset School Committee voted to get rid of the Native American logo representing the "Warrior" but will keep the name "Warrior" as the official mascot. The original mascot depicted a Native American man viewed from the side with Black & Gold war paint on his face, and a feather head-dress on his head, very similar to the Washington Redskins Native American logo. The logo for the school is now a block "N" with one half of the "N" painted black, and the other half painted gold.

The 2016 boys' soccer team finished the season ranked ninth in the nation by USA Today on its final Super 25 Expert Rankings. The 2018 boys’ soccer team finished the season ranked third in the nation and won the MIAA DII State Championship.

The boys hockey team advanced to the 2024 state final but lost to Marblehead. In the 2024-25 season the hockey team won the Division 3 state championship and completed an undefeated season in the process.

== Academics ==
Nauset Regional High School has several educational departments, including English, Mathematics, Social Studies (History), Science, World Language, Physical Education/Health, Fine and Applied Arts, Business and Technology, Dramatic Arts, and Special Education.

== Notable alumni ==
- Aaron Bushnell (attended 2013–14), Air Force service member, self-immolated outside the Embassy of Israel in Washington D.C. to protest against the Gaza war
- Julian Cyr (class of 2004), politician and LGBT activist
- Mike DeVito (class of 2002), professional football player
- Nick Minnerath (class of 2006), professional basketball player
- Meghan Trainor (class of 2012), singer-songwriter, voice actress, and television personality
- Jordon Hudson (class of 2019), girlfriend of 8-time Super Bowl champion head coach, Bill Belichick, former head coach of the New England Patriots

== Notable faculty ==
- Mike Sherman - Former head football coach at Nauset, former NFL head coach for the Green Bay Packers and Texas A&M
