= Nauset Public Schools =

School district in Orleans, Massachusetts

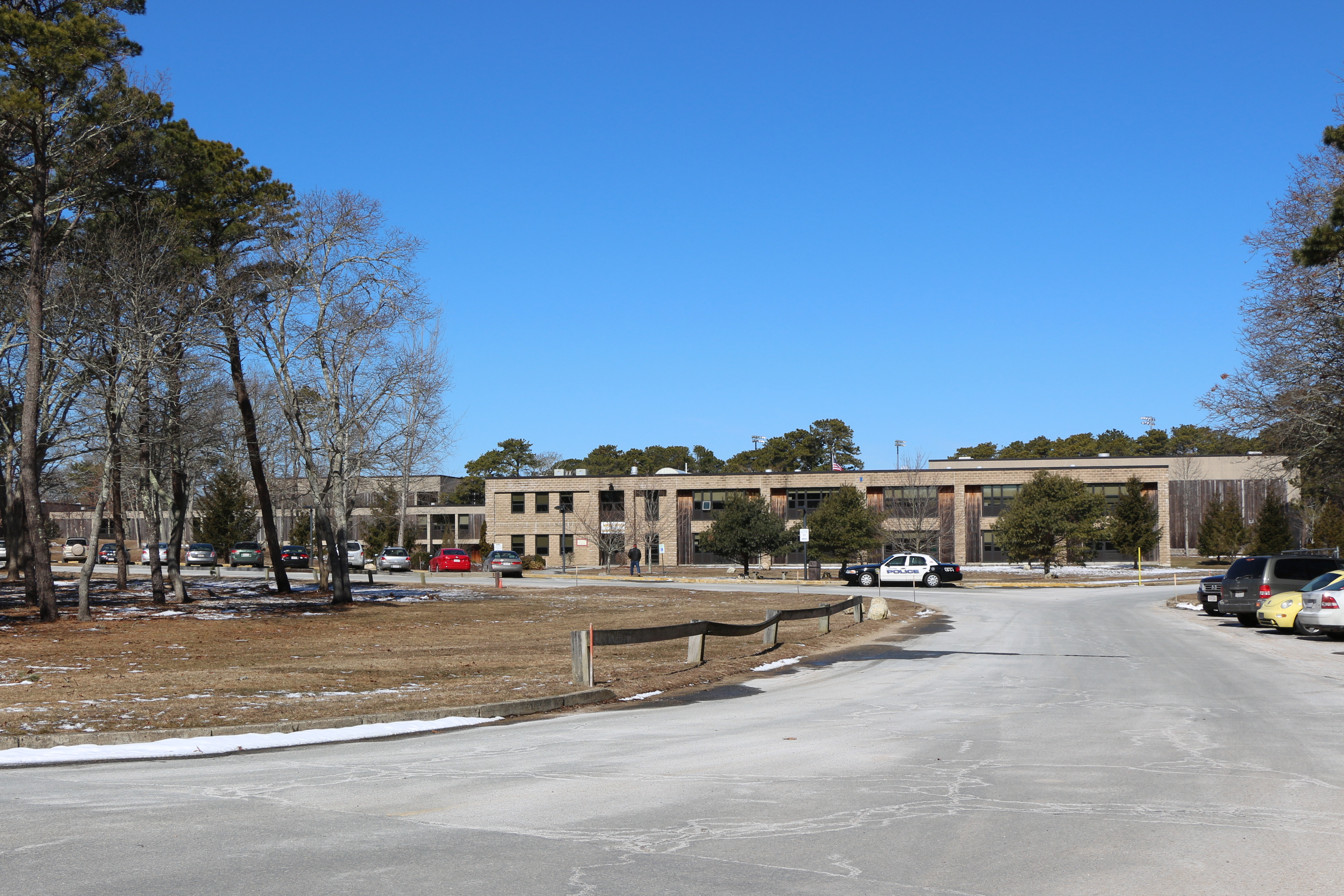
Nauset Regional High School

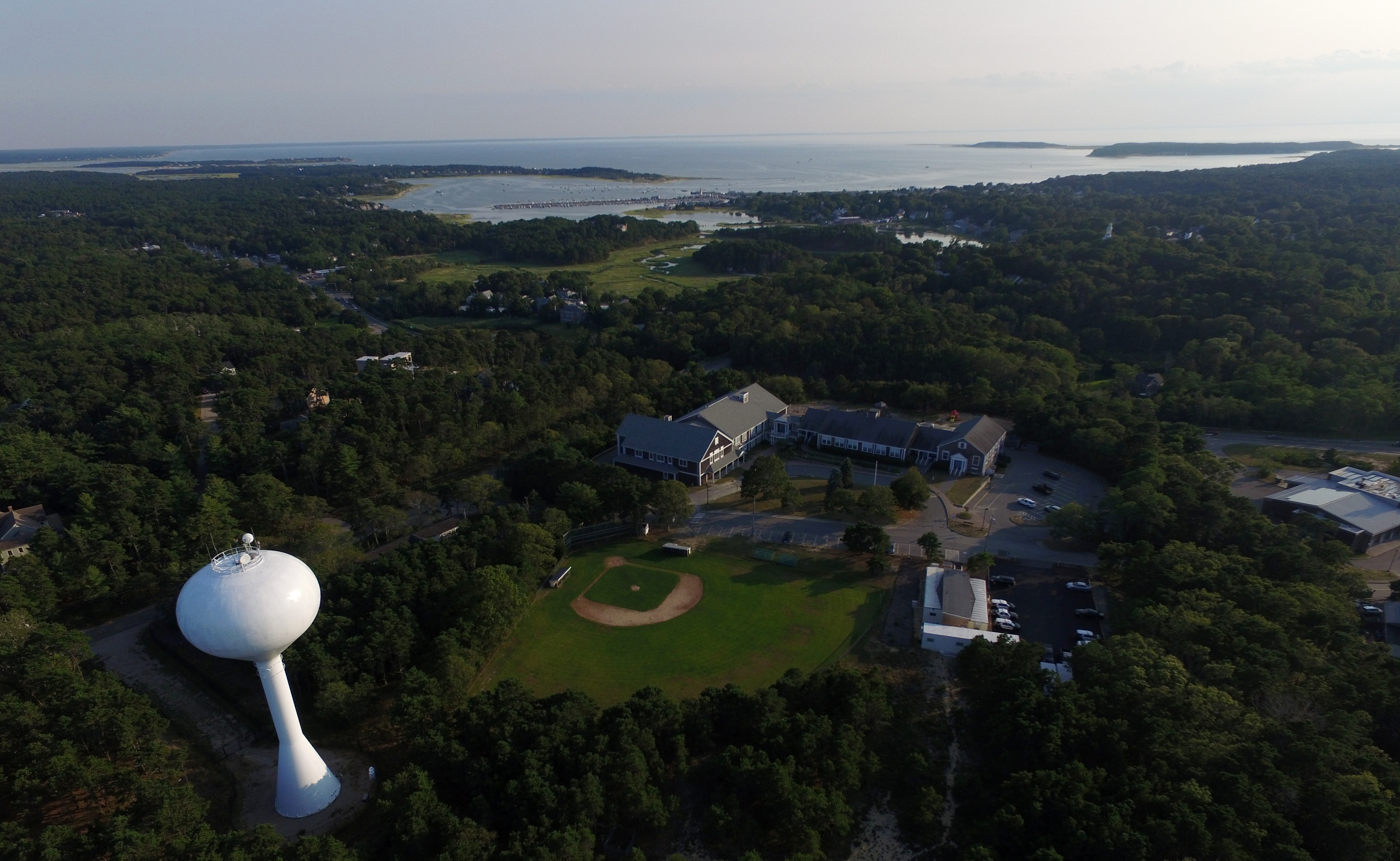
Aerial photo of Wellfleet Elementary, 2017

Nauset Public Schools, or the Nauset Regional School District, is a school district headquartered in Orleans, Massachusetts. In addition to Orleans its attendance area includes Brewster, Eastham, and Wellfleet.

It also takes middle and high school students from Truro, and since 2012 high school students from Provincetown. The Provincetown Schools district in 2010 agreed to close Provincetown High School and send its high school students to Nauset.

In 1993 the school district had 3,207 students. Expensive housing and a decline in births resulted in enrollment declines, with enrollment at 2,361 in 2020. In 2020 all of its schools except for Eastham Elementary lost students.

Michael Gradone was superintendent until his 2009 retirement.

== Schools ==
Secondary

- Nauset Regional High School (Eastham)
- Nauset Regional Middle School (Orleans)

Primary

- Eastham Elementary School (Eastham)
- Eddy Elementary School (Brewster)
- Orleans Elementary School (Orleans)
- Stony Brook Elementary School (Brewster)
- Wellfleet Elementary School (Wellfleet)

Preschool

- Nauset Integrated Preschool (at Eastham and Stony Brook elementaries)
