= Provincetown Public Schools =

School district in Massachusetts, United States

Provincetown International Baccalaureate World Schools
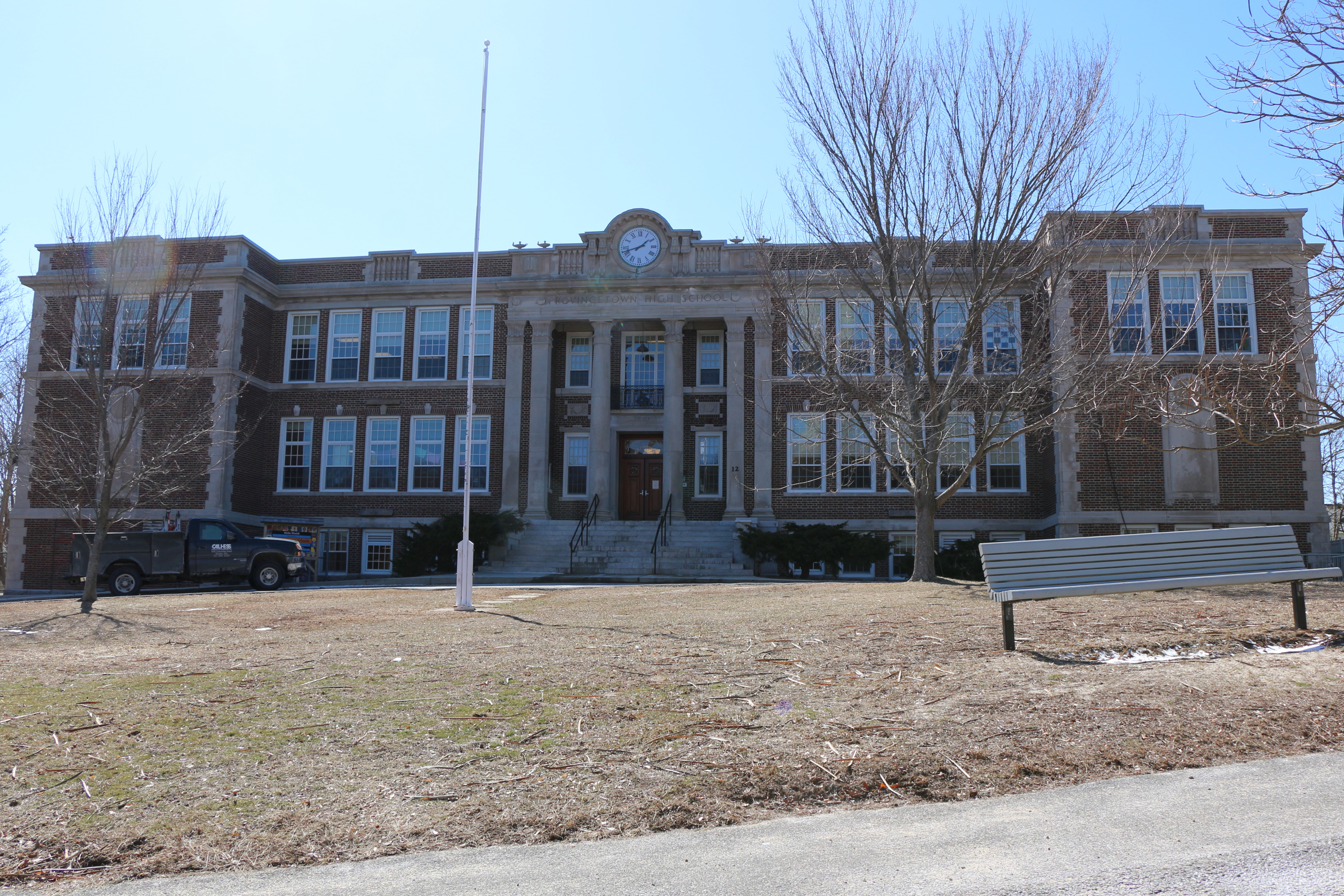

Location
- Provincetown, Massachusetts; United States
- Coordinates: 42°03′08″N 70°11′30″W

District information
- Type: Public K-8
- Grades: Preschool - 8
- Established: 2013
- Superintendent: Mr. Paul Teixeira

Students and staff
- Students: 160 (2024)
- Colors: Black & Orange

Other information
- Sports team: Fishermen
- Website: www.provincetownschools.com

Provincetown Public Schools, also known as Provincetown School District, or Provincetown International Baccalaureate (IB) World Schools, is the school district of Provincetown, Massachusetts, serving grades Kindergarten through 8. The current K-8 building, previously the high school building, was dedicated in 1938. the district previously covered all grades, including Provincetown High School (7-12).

The school's athletic nickname is The Fishermen and the school colors are black and orange. The school became an International Baccalaureate Public Middle school on June 7, 2013, following the graduation ceremony of the final senior high school class of the old Provincetown High School. The high school building is now used for grades K-8. PY1 (Primary Years) through MY3 (Middle Years) students. Younger students, 6 weeks through Pre-School, Pre-Kindergarten and Kindergarten are around the corner in the Veterans Memorial Elementary School (VMES) which now includes the Early Learning Center (ELC).

The K-8 school is located at 12 Winslow Street, and is an International Baccalaureate World School offering the IB program to Kindergarten through Middle Years Program 3 students, aged 3–15. Provincetown IB Schools accepts school choice students from other school districts.

== History ==
=== High school closure ===
In 2010 the school regionalization planning committee recommended to close Provincetown High, move elementary grades into the building, and have only preschool at the former Veterans Memorial Elementary.

In 2010, the school committee voted unanimously to phase out the high school students in Provincetown High School due to declining enrollment. High-school students who live in Provincetown are now redistricted to attend Nauset Regional High School (of Nauset Public Schools). Other area options include Sturgis Charter Public School and Cape Cod Regional Technical High School. PHS had one of the smallest high school enrollments in the country its last two years.

By 2012 the 9th and 10th grade students were already moved to Nauset Regional while 11th and 12th grade students remained at Provincetown High. In 2012 there were 14 students enrolled, all female, for grades 11 and 12. Provincetown High School's last senior class graduated on June 7, 2013. The final Senior class numbered eight.

=== K-8 Current Era ===
In 2014, the K-8 School had 109 students. In 2019, it had 125 students. In 2024 Provincetown IB World Schools has 160 students with enrollment having risen steadily over the previous 10 years since the implementation of the International Baccalaureate (IB) programme, begun in 2013 by Principal Kim Pike and Superintendent Dr. Beth Singer. The current Principal Elizabeth Francis and Superintendent Gerry Goyette remain fully committed to the IB vision, mission and philosophy of the school. Provincetown IB world Schools is bucking the declining enrollment trend of other middle schools in the region and has a very diverse and enriching range of learning opportunities for students where the 10 Approaches To Learning Skills of the IB are in daily practice.

== Academics ==
The school's location in a well-established art colony township provides stellar opportunities for students interested in the visual or performing arts as well as marine life sciences, fishing, sailing and tourism. Students visit the Dune Shacks every year for extended stays that incorporate history, art and physical activity. As an IB school PTS is a dual language school with English / Spanish being the most common iteration of that policy. The school is currently teaching Italian.

== Sports ==
PTS fields teams in soccer (Fall) and basketball (Winter) and currently has Spring Clinics for Archery, Cricket, Pickleball, Tennis, Nitroball and Floor Hockey. The projected redevelopment of Motta Field beginning in 2025 will provide the school with a full athletic track and field program for the 2026 school year.

Historically, one of Provincetown's greatest athletic achievements was when the varsity baseball team defeated a much bigger and more talented Mashpee High School team in the 2005 Massachusetts State Playoffs Quarterfinal Round. Provincetown had an enrollment of around 100 students in grades 7–12 at the time, while Mashpee had an enrollment of over 1,000 students. Provincetown defeated Mashpee 7-6 in extra innings and advanced all the way to the Division 3 State Semi-Finals with the victory, the deepest any athletics team at Provincetown had gone in the playoffs in over 15 years.

== Schools ==
Previously, the district had two schools, Veterans Memorial Elementary School and Provincetown High School.

By 2012, Veterans Memorial Elementary School was being refurbished to be the Veterans Memorial Community Center, but it remains active as a school building, as it currently houses the preschool and kindergarten classes for Provincetown IB World Schools.

== See also ==
- Non-high school district (for the post-2013 period)
