= Provincetown (disambiguation) =

Provincetown is a New England town located at the very tip of Cape Cod, Massachusetts.

Provincetown may also refer to:

- Provincetown (CDP), Massachusetts, a Census-Designated Place which includes the more dense "downtown" part of Provincetown
- Provincetown Harbor, the harbor which borders the town of Provincetown, Massachusetts
- Provincetown Historic District, o portion of downtown Provincetown that is listed in the National Register of Historic Places
- Provincetown Municipal Airport, the small airport that serves Provincetown and nearby communities
- Provincetown-Boston Airline, a now-defunct commuter airline that once served those markets
- Provincetown Public Library (old), the historic building that once housed the town's public library
- Provincetown High School, the high school that is scheduled to close in the Spring of 2014
- Provincetown Players, a theater company that started in Provincetown in 1915, moved to New York City, and launched the career of playwright Eugene O’Neill
- Provincetown Playhouse, a theater in Greenwich village that was home to the above company, wherein Bette Davis made her New York stage debut
- "Provincetown", a 2026 song by Tori Amos from the album In Times of Dragons
