= Center Methodist Church =

Historic church in Massachusetts, United States

- U.S. National Register of Historic Places
- U.S. Historic district – Contributing property
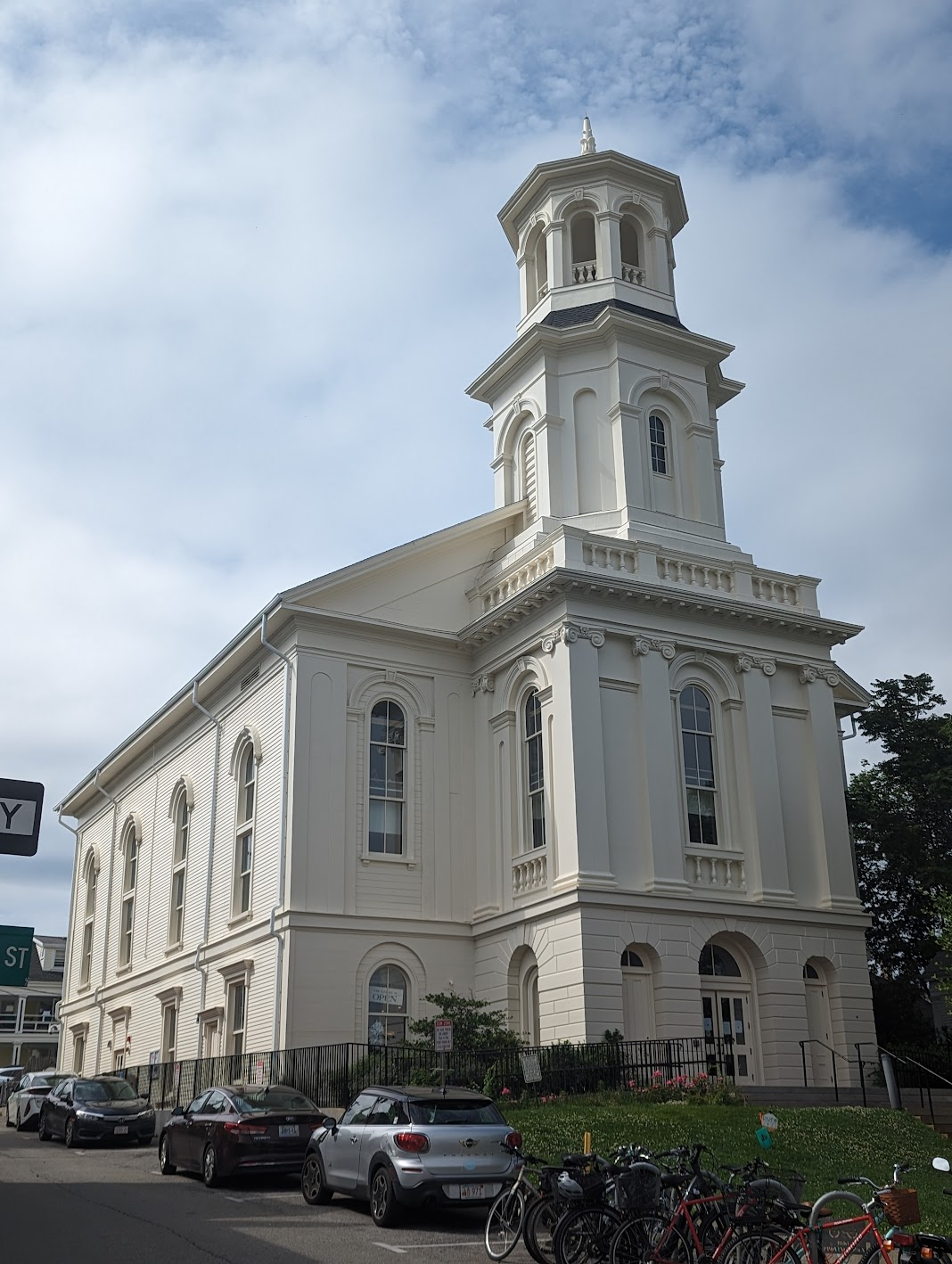
- The library in 2023

- Location within Cape Cod
- Location: 356 Commercial St; Provincetown, Massachusetts
- Coordinates: 42.053470°N 70.184414°W
- Part of: Provincetown Historic District (ID89001148)
- NRHP reference No.: 75000247

Significant dates
- Added to NRHP: October 31, 1975
- Designated CP: August 30, 1989

The Center Methodist Church or Center Methodist Episcopal Church is located in Provincetown, Massachusetts at 356 Commercial Street. It is listed on the National Register of Historic Places. The church moved to a new building in 1955, and the building has changed hands several times since. It is currently the home of the Provincetown Public Library.

== History ==
Evolution of Provincetown Landmark:

- 1860 - Center Methodist Episcopal Church
- 1958 - Chrysler Art Museum
- 1974 - Center for the Arts
- 1976 - Provincetown Heritage Museum
- 2005 - Provincetown Public Library

The church was built in 1860. It was said to be the largest church of Methodist denomination anywhere in the United States. It cost $22,000 to complete, and had room to seat 900 people in 128 pews. The original spire was 162 feet tall and contained a huge bronze bell cast by George Holbrook in Eastmeadow, Massachusetts, according to a history of Provincetown Methodists done in 1995 by the Provincetown Methodist congregation's 200th Anniversary Committee. The steeple was weakened and damaged in the Portland Gale, and so a new steeple, restored in 2007, was reduced to be 100 feet off the ground. Yet, according to the Provincetown Banner, the local newspaper:

Even today looking from the end of MacMillan Wharf towards town, the building is one of the most prominent on the skyline.

— Provincetown Banner, 28 April 2005

=== Chrysler Art Museum of Provincetown ===
In 1958, the building was sold for $40,000 to Walter P. Chrysler Jr. – the son of Walter Chrysler, the founder of the Chrysler Corporation – for use as the Chrysler Art Museum of Provincetown. During this period he collected many works by local artists. In 1962, however, his collection became embroiled in a scandal in the art community. That summer, the museum housed an exhibition from his collection entitled "The Controversial Century: 1850–1950". Out of the 187 works displayed, 90 were claimed to be forgeries by the Art Dealers Association of America. Among the declared fakes were works purported to be by Henri Matisse, Vincent van Gogh (4 of the 5 shown), Pierre Bonnard and Paul Klee. Most of the suspect works had been purchased over a two-year period from two New York dealers. Mr. Chrysler defended his acquisitions and their veracity, saying, "I don't make any claim for their being the greatest examples of each artist, but we can't look at masterpieces all the time. I think that would be rather dull."

Chrysler continued to run the museum with limited success until he closed it in 1970. In 1971, he moved his collection to Virginia, where it is still operating today as the Chrysler Museum of Art. There are differing accounts as to the reason for the move. According to the Museum's website, "The efflorescence of paintings, sculpture, artifacts and glass soon outgrew its limited quarters in a 19th-century church, however, and Chrysler began seeking a new home for the works." The people of Provincetown remember it differently, however. The local newspaper reported it differently, saying, "Discouraged when the Town of Provincetown would not help him find parking for visitors to the museum, Chrysler packed up his collection and moved ..." Whatever the reason, the building was sold in 1974 for $90,000 to

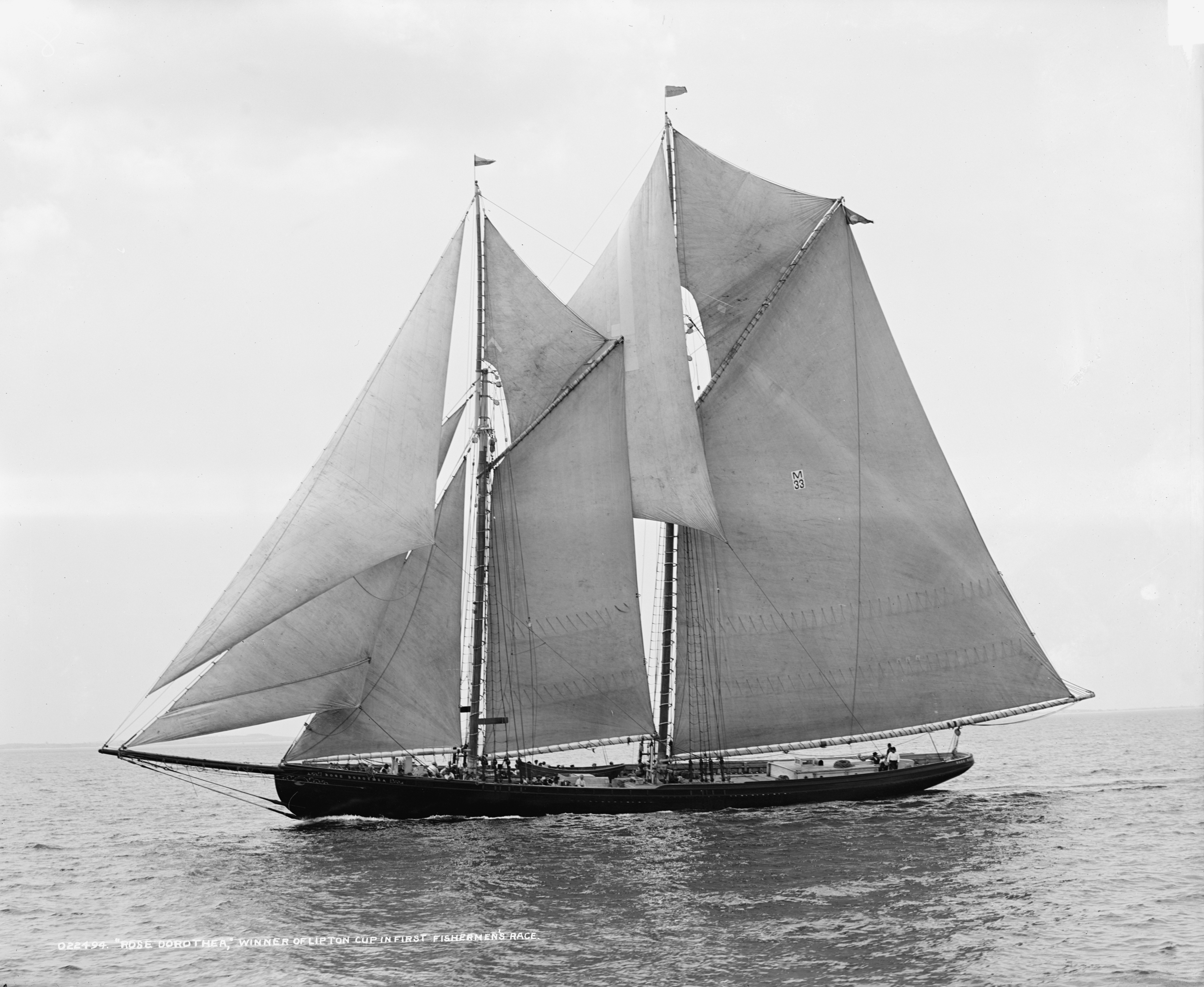
The Rose Dorothea

=== Heritage Museum ===
Through the efforts of the Provincetown Historical Association and the Historic District Study Committee, the building was nominated to the National Register of Historic Places. It received certification in October 1975. Subsequently, in 1976, a special town meeting voted to acquire the building for $135,000, and it was sold to the Provincetown Historical Association and used for the display of town artifacts as the Provincetown Heritage Museum. The Provincetown Heritage Museum officially opened to the public on July 4, 1976.

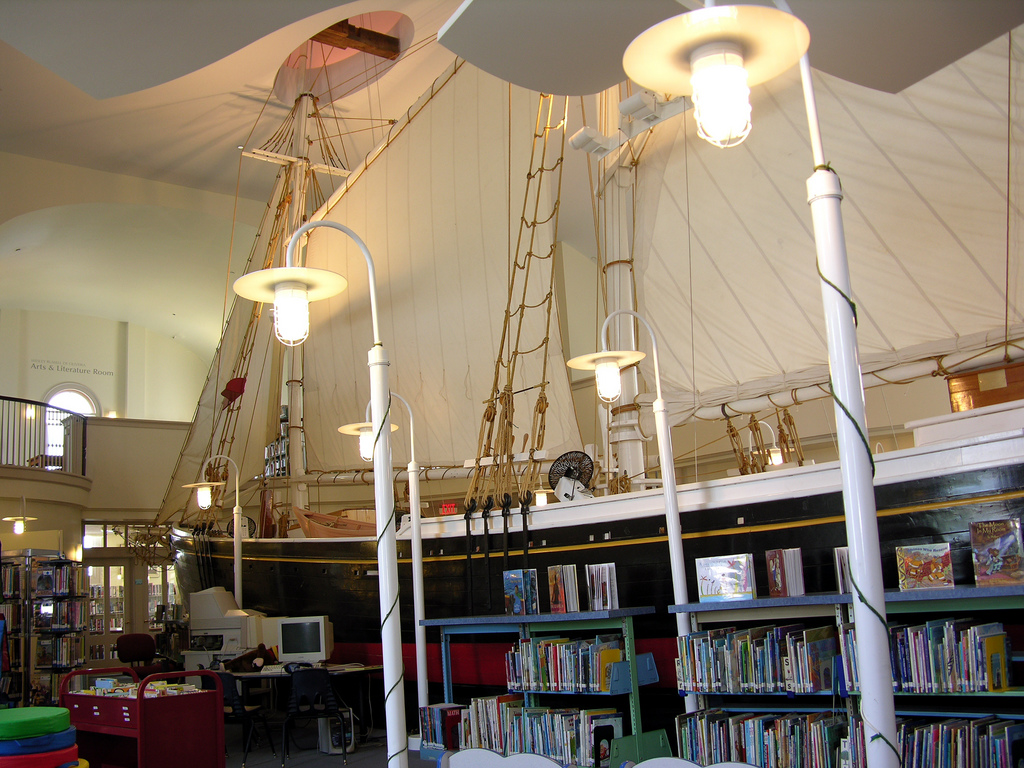
Half-scale replica of the Rose Dorothea, inside the Provincetown Public Library (the former Center Methodist Church)

==== The Rose Dorothea ====
A major addition to the building came about in 1977, during the Heritage Museum's stewardship. That addition is a half-scale replica of Provincetown's Grand Banks fishing schooner, the Rose Dorothea. On August 1, 1907, the Rose Dorothea won the Lipton's Cup, despite breaking one of her masts, in the first and only Fisherman's Race, a 42-mile race from Provincetown to Gloucester to Boston. The original vessel was sold in 1916 to a Newfoundland company that used her to ferry salt and other supplies to Portugal. In February 1917, a German U-boat submarine surfaced next to the schooner as she neared the coast of Lisbon, and then, after allowing her crew to evacuate in lifeboats, sank her. Sixty years later, in 1977, construction began on the replica fishing schooner, and it was dedicated on June 25, 1988. The completed model spans a 66'6" length and a 12'6" beam. The original vessel was 108.7 feet long, weighed 108 tons and had a crew of 26 men.

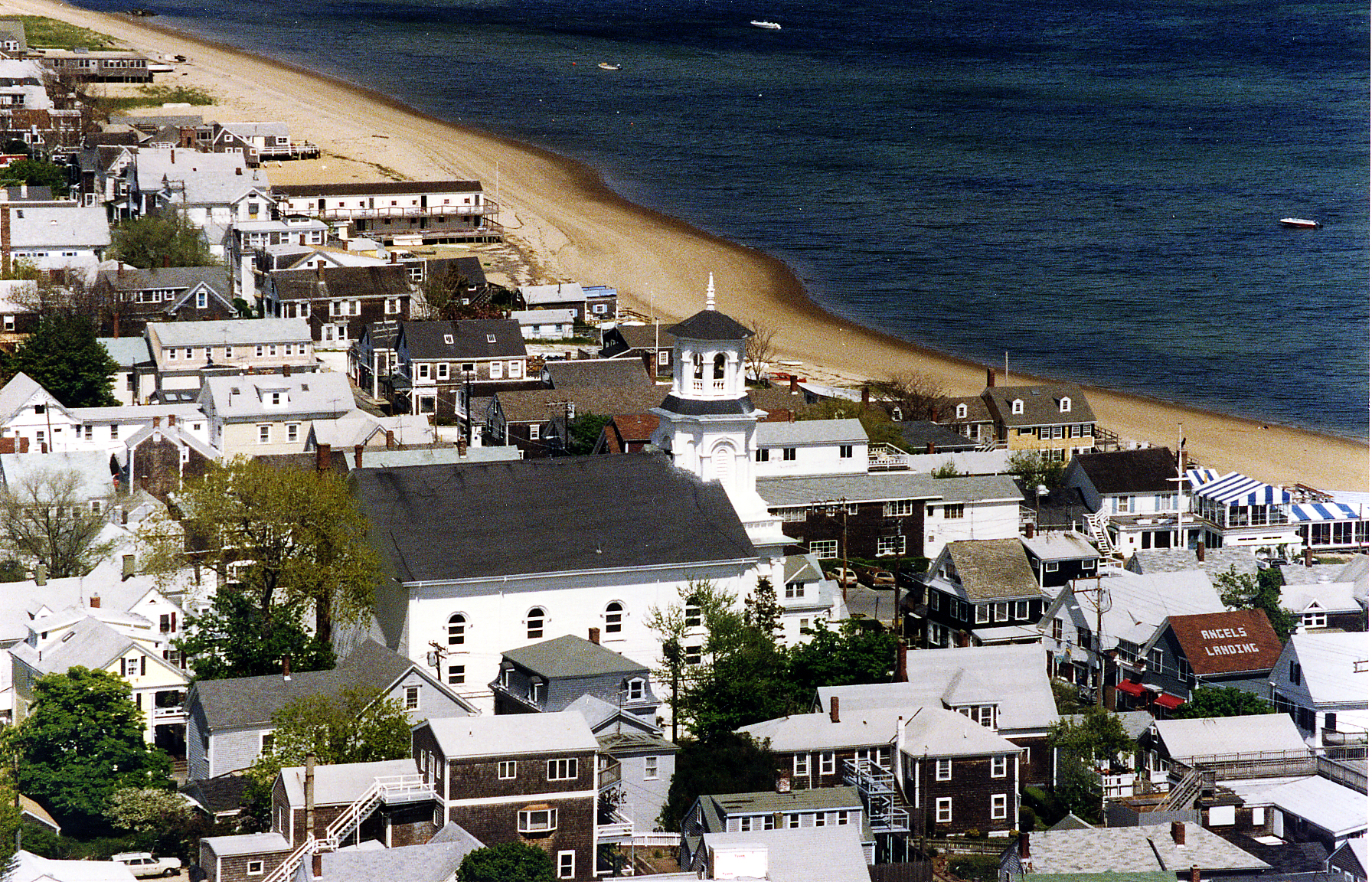
The Center Methodist Church is the most prominent building in this part of Provincetown center.

=== Provincetown Public Library ===
The Heritage Museum operated on a seasonal basis with a minimal staff and a group of volunteers through the summer of 2000, and in 2001, the Town voted to convey this property to the Provincetown Public Library. In 2002 renovations began to convert the building into the Provincetown Public Library. Upon completion, the Provincetown Public Library would move into this building from another historic building, the old Provincetown Public Library, located several blocks up Commercial Street.

The Provincetown Public Library website set forth the plans:

The interior of the building will be completely gutted, reconstructed and restored to its original design insomuch as is possible. ... Finally complying with the Massachusetts Historical Commission requirements to maintain the grand staircases and restore the vaulted ceiling in this National Historic Landmark property, the stairs will be re-railed in order to open them for use by the public, and the vaulted ceiling will be enhanced with a secondary vault to embrace and accommodate the masts of the Rose. At last, after many long years of work, the Provincetown Public Library will officially open to the public on April 28, 2005, and this great building that has had so many lives will begin a new phase in its history.

As a part of the process, the Town was faced with another decision – the choice of keeping the Rose Dorothea and incorporate it into the new library, or the choice of removing it, thus destroying it in the process. It was decided to keep the schooner intact, and the interior of the library can be seen in the accompanying photo.

== See also ==
- National Register of Historic Places listings in Barnstable County, Massachusetts
