= First Universalist Church (Provincetown, Massachusetts) =

Historic church in Massachusetts, United States

- Unitarian Universalist Meeting House of Provincetown
- U.S. National Register of Historic Places
- U.S. Historic district – Contributing property
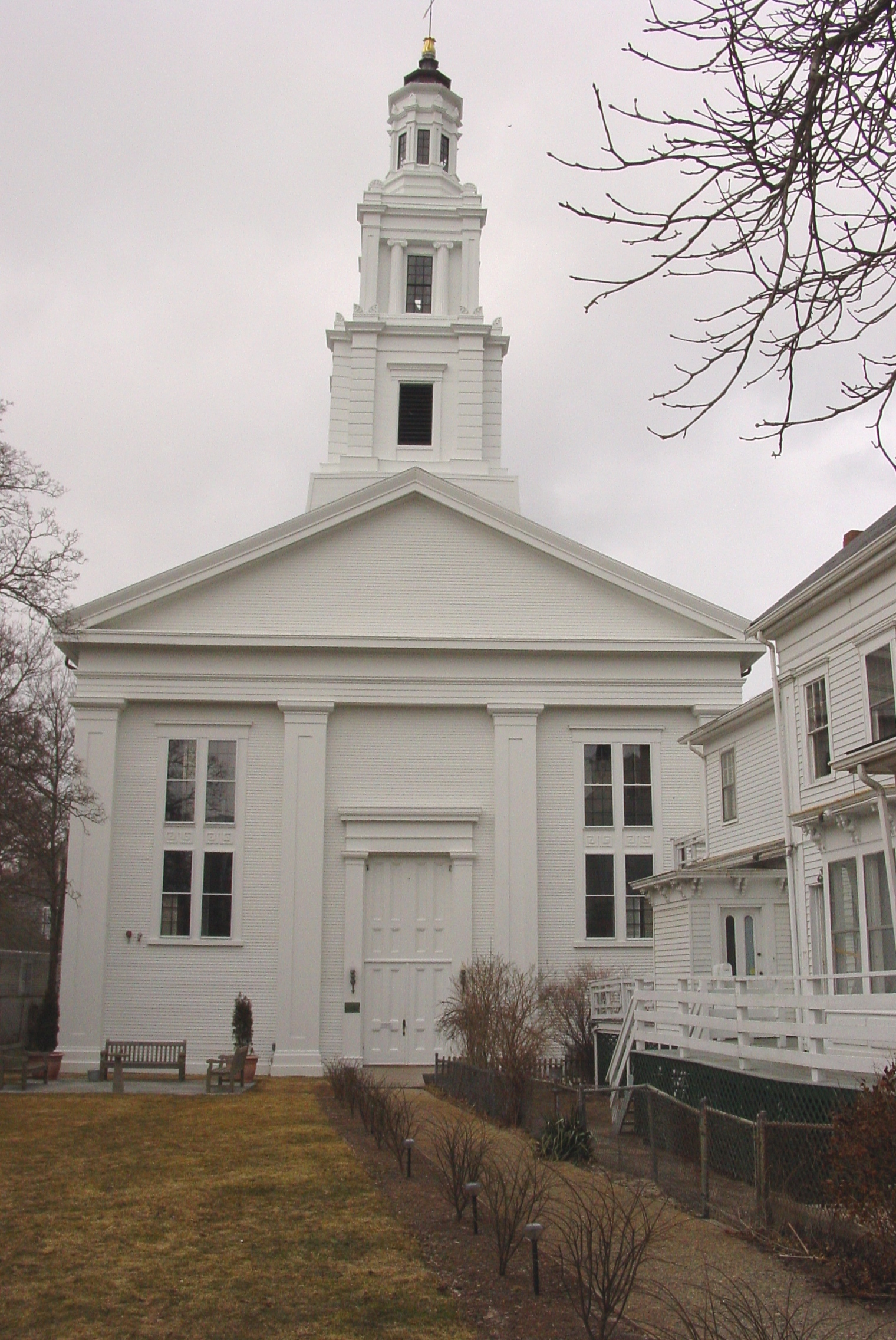

- Location within Cape Cod
- Location: Provincetown, Massachusetts
- Coordinates: 42°3′3″N 70°11′17″W
- Built: 1847
- Architect: Wendte, Carl; Hallet, Benjamin
- Architectural style: Greek Revival
- Part of: Provincetown Historic District (ID89001148)
- NRHP reference No.: 72000122

Significant dates
- Added to NRHP: February 23, 1972
- Designated CP: August 30, 1989

The Unitarian Universalist Meeting House of Provincetown is an historic church at 236 Commercial Street in Provincetown, Massachusetts. The Greek Revival building was built in 1847 based on a design by Benjamin Hallett, for a congregation that had been established in 1829. It is a massive post and beam timber-frame construction, and was originally built without the tower. The tower, which is telescopic in form, with Greek ornamentation, is the only surviving steeple in Provincetown, and is a landmark for seafarers.

The church was listed on the National Register of Historic Places in 1972, and included in the Provincetown Historic District in 1989. It is now called the Unitarian Universalist Meeting House.

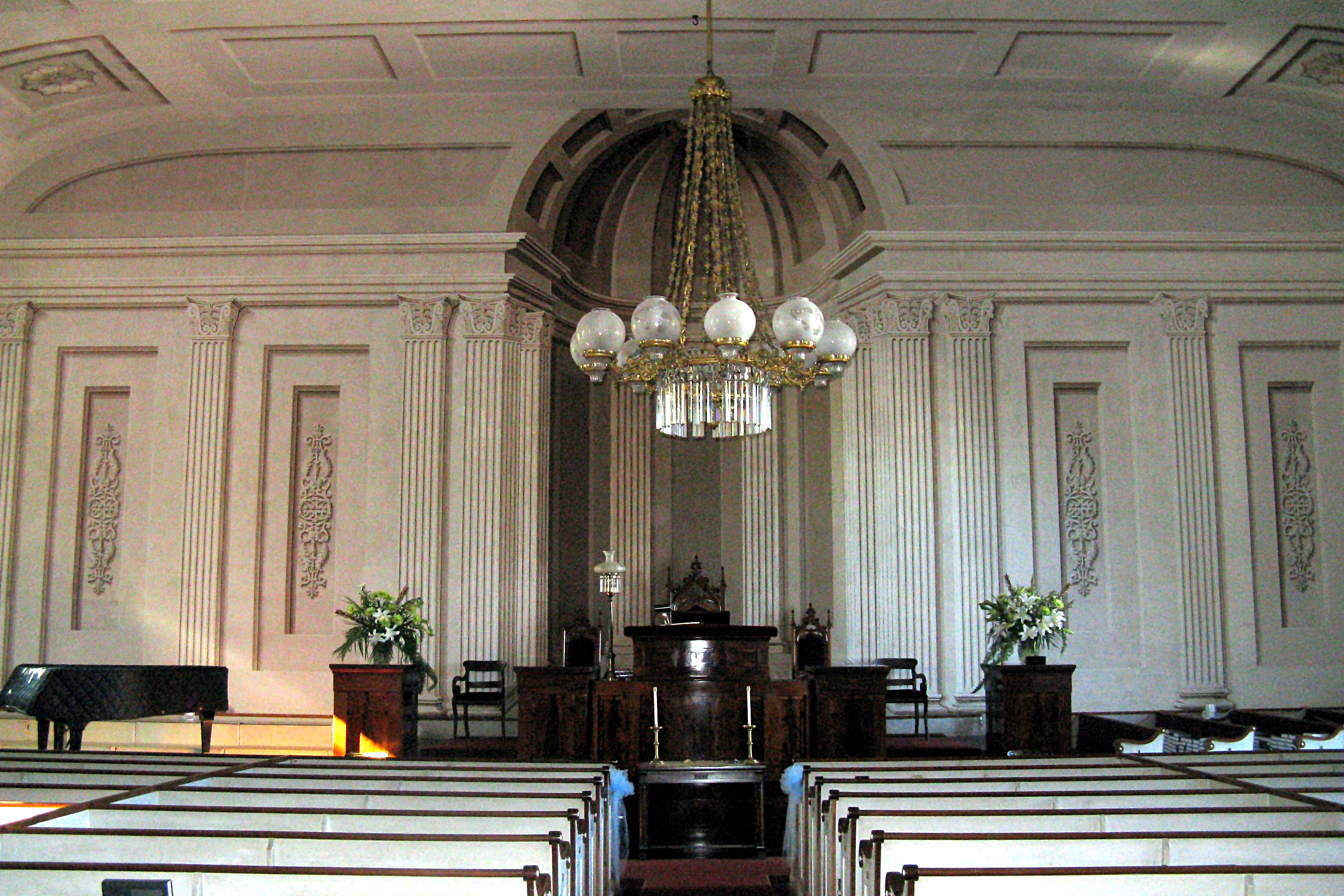
Interior trompe-l'œil ceiling and wall frescos were done in egg tempera by Carl Wendt in 1847.

== See also ==
- National Register of Historic Places listings in Barnstable County, Massachusetts
