= Provincetown (CDP), Massachusetts =

Provincetown, Massachusetts
- Census-designated place
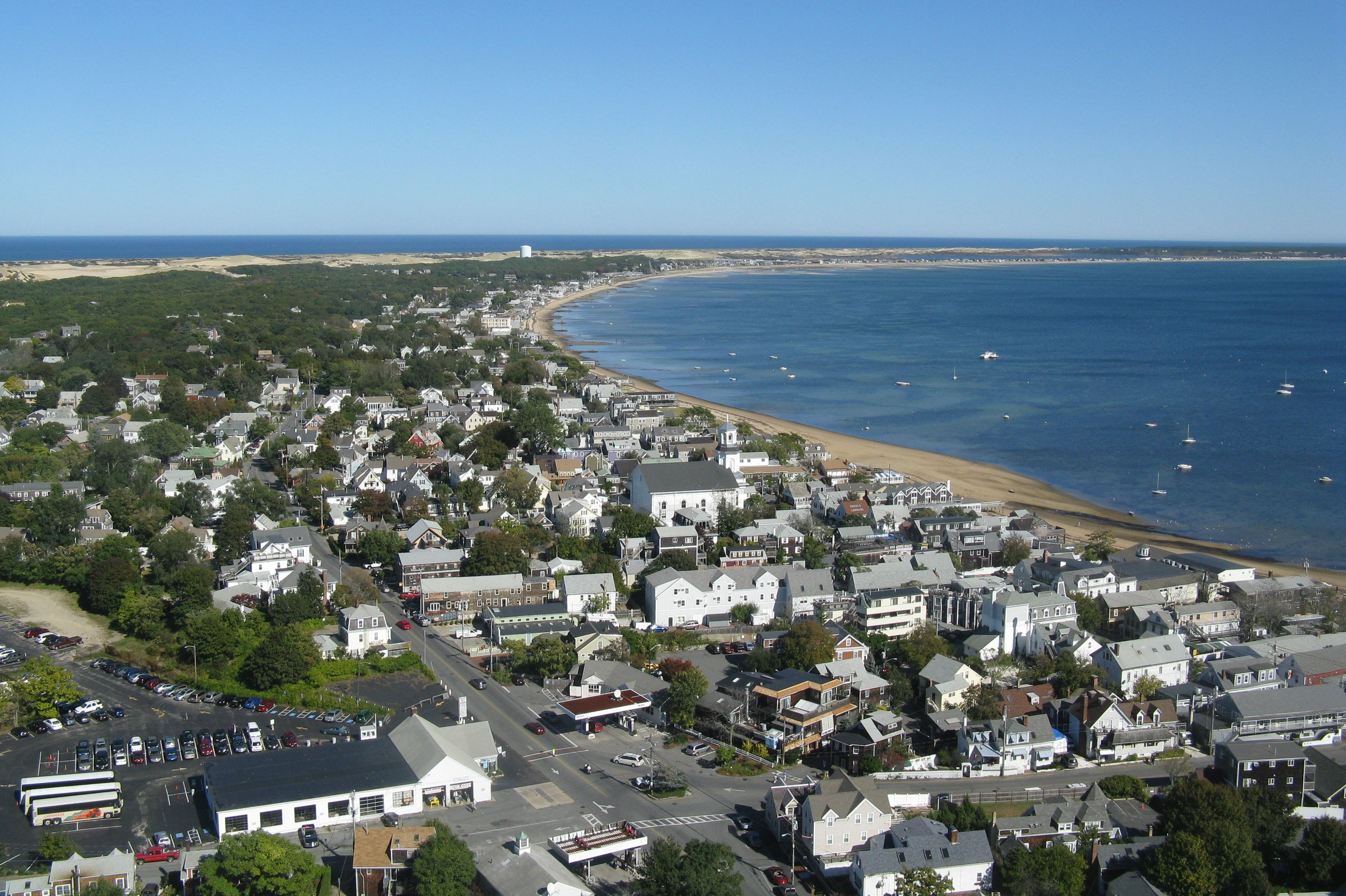
- Aerial view of Provincetown

- Location in Barnstable County and the state of Massachusetts.
- Coordinates: 42°2′57″N 70°10′31″W
- Country: United States
- State: Massachusetts
- County: Barnstable
- Town: Provincetown

Area
  - Total: 5.32 sq mi (13.77 km^{2})
  - Land: 1.79 sq mi (4.63 km^{2})
  - Water: 3.53 sq mi (9.14 km^{2})
- Elevation: 0 ft (0 m)

Population (2020)
  - Total: 3,318
  - Density: 1,856.3/sq mi (716.74/km^{2})
- Time zone: UTC-5 (Eastern (EST))
  - Summer (DST): UTC-4 (EDT)
- ZIP code: 02657
- Area code: 508
- FIPS code: 25-55535
- GNIS feature ID: 2378207

Provincetown (CDP) is a census-designated place (CDP) in the town of Provincetown in Barnstable County, Massachusetts, United States. The population was 2,642 at the 2010 census, out of 2,942 in the entire town.

== Geography ==
The Provincetown CDP comprises the densely populated main settlement within the town of Provincetown. The CDP is bounded by U.S. Route 6 to the north, by the western extension of Massachusetts Route 6A (Province Lands Road) to the southwest, by Provincetown Harbor to the south, and by the Truro town line to the east.

According to the United States Census Bureau, the CDP has a total area of 5.3 square miles (13.6 km^{2}), of which 1.8 square miles (4.6 km^{2}) is land, and 3.4 square miles (8.9 km^{2}) (65.86%) is water.

== Demographics ==
Historical population
Census	Pop.	Note	%±
2020	3,318		—
U.S. Decennial Census

As of the census of 2000, there were 3,192 people, 1,726 households, and 429 families residing in the CDP. The population density was 680.9/km^{2} (1,759.3/mi^{2}). There were 3,712 housing units at an average density of 791.8/km^{2} (2,045.9/mi^{2}). The racial makeup of the CDP was 87.53% White, 7.49% Black or African American, 0.31% Native American, 0.50% Asian, 1.13% from other races, and 3.04% from two or more races. Hispanic or Latino of any race were 2.10% of the population.

There were 1,726 households, out of which 8.5% had children under the age of 18 living with them, 17.7% were married couples living together, 5.0% had a female householder with no husband present, and 75.1% were non-families. 54.0% of all households were made up of individuals, and 14.9% had someone living alone who was 65 years of age or older. The average household size was 1.67 and the average family size was 2.62.

In the CDP, the population was spread out, with 7.6% under the age of 18, 5.1% from 18 to 24, 36.4% from 25 to 44, 32.6% from 45 to 64, and 18.3% who were 65 years of age or older. The median age was 45 years. For every 100 females, there were 116.4 males. For every 100 females age 18 and over, there were 116.6 males.

The median income for a household in the CDP was $32,731, and the median income for a family was $39,786. Males had a median income of $30,655 versus $25,595 for females. The per capita income for the CDP was $26,878. About 8.7% of families and 15.5% of the population were below the poverty line, including 21.6% of those under age 18 and 17.3% of those age 65 or over.
