= Provincetown Public Library (old) =

- U.S. National Register of Historic Places
- U.S. Historic district – Contributing property
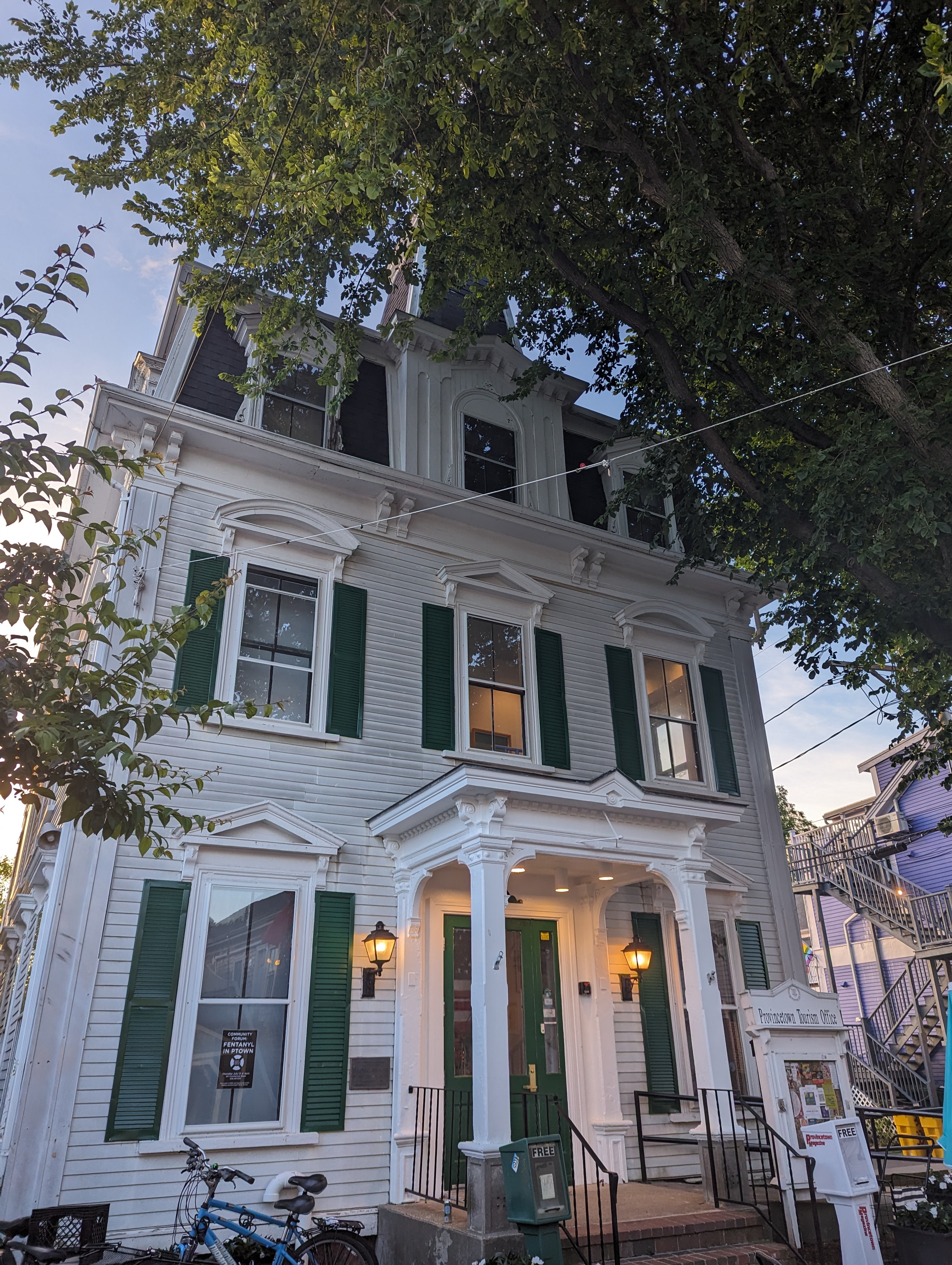
- The library building as the town's tourism board in 2023

- Location within Cape Cod Location within Massachusetts Location within the United States
- Location: 330 Commercial St., Provincetown, Massachusetts
- Coordinates: 42.052566°N 70.185181°W
- Area: less than one acre
- Built: 1874
- Part of: Provincetown Historic District (ID89001148)
- NRHP reference No.: 75000248

Significant dates
- Added to NRHP: April 21, 1975
- Designated CP: August 30, 1989

The Old Provincetown Public Library building is a historic building at 330 Commercial Street in downtown Provincetown, Massachusetts. Built in 1874, it served as the town's public library from then until 2002, when the library was moved to the former Center Methodist Church. The building, a fine local example of Second Empire architecture, now houses the local tourist board. It was listed on the National Register of Historic Places in 1975.

== Description and history ==
The former Provincetown Public Library building stands on Commercial Street, Provincetown's principal commercial street, at the northwest corner with Freeman Street. It is a 2-1/2 story wood-frame structure, with a mansard roof providing a full third story. The exterior is finished in wooden clapboards, and the roof features a mansarded turret at the center of the front facade. The front is three bays wide, with a center entrance. Windows are sash, and are framed in a variety of different bracketed moulded hoods, some featuring simple cornices, with others have segmented-arch or triangular pediments. The main cornice is adorned with paired brackets, and a second cornice marks the transition between the differing slopes of the roof. A 1970s addition extends the building to the rear.

The former library building was constructed in 1874, and was a gift to the town from Nathaniel Freeman. Originally, only the ground floor housed the library: the second floor housed a YMCA, and the third floor was used as commercial space. In the library's early years, the most colorful of its stewards was Abbie Cook Putnam. In 1977, the library — by now the building's sole occupant — was extensively renovated. The librarian at the time was Alice O'Grady Joseph (d 2010), who was in charge from 1965 to 1982.

The space housed the library until 2002, when the library was moved to the former Center Methodist Church. The building now houses the local tourist board offices.

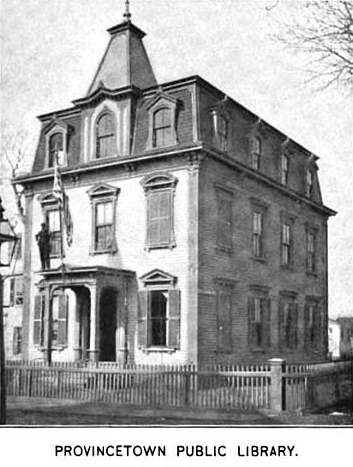
1891 Photo, reprinted in 1899

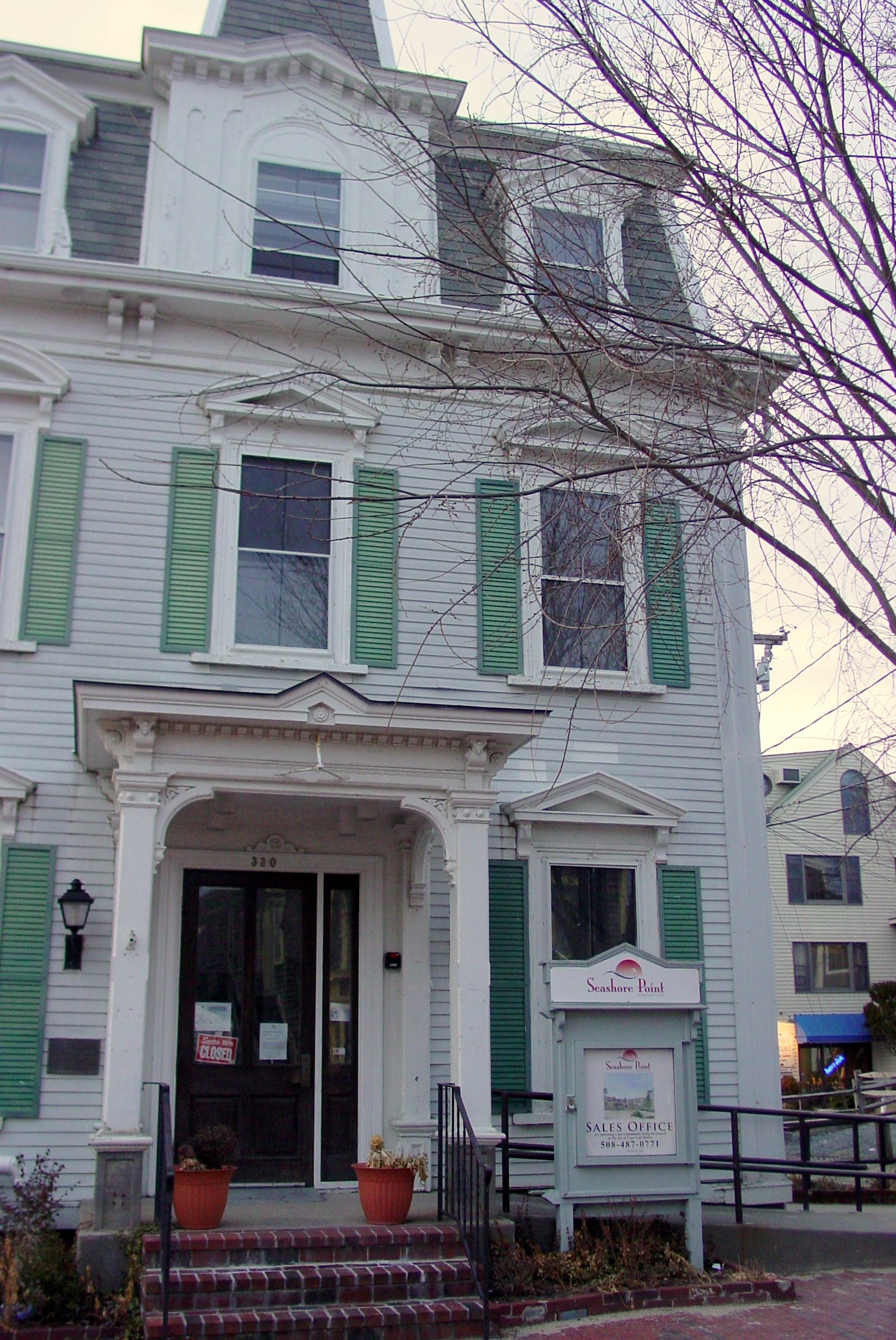
The same building in 2007 when it was occupied by the offices of Seashore Point

== See also ==
- National Register of Historic Places listings in Barnstable County, Massachusetts
