= Provincetown Historic District =

- U.S. National Register of Historic Places
- U.S. Historic district
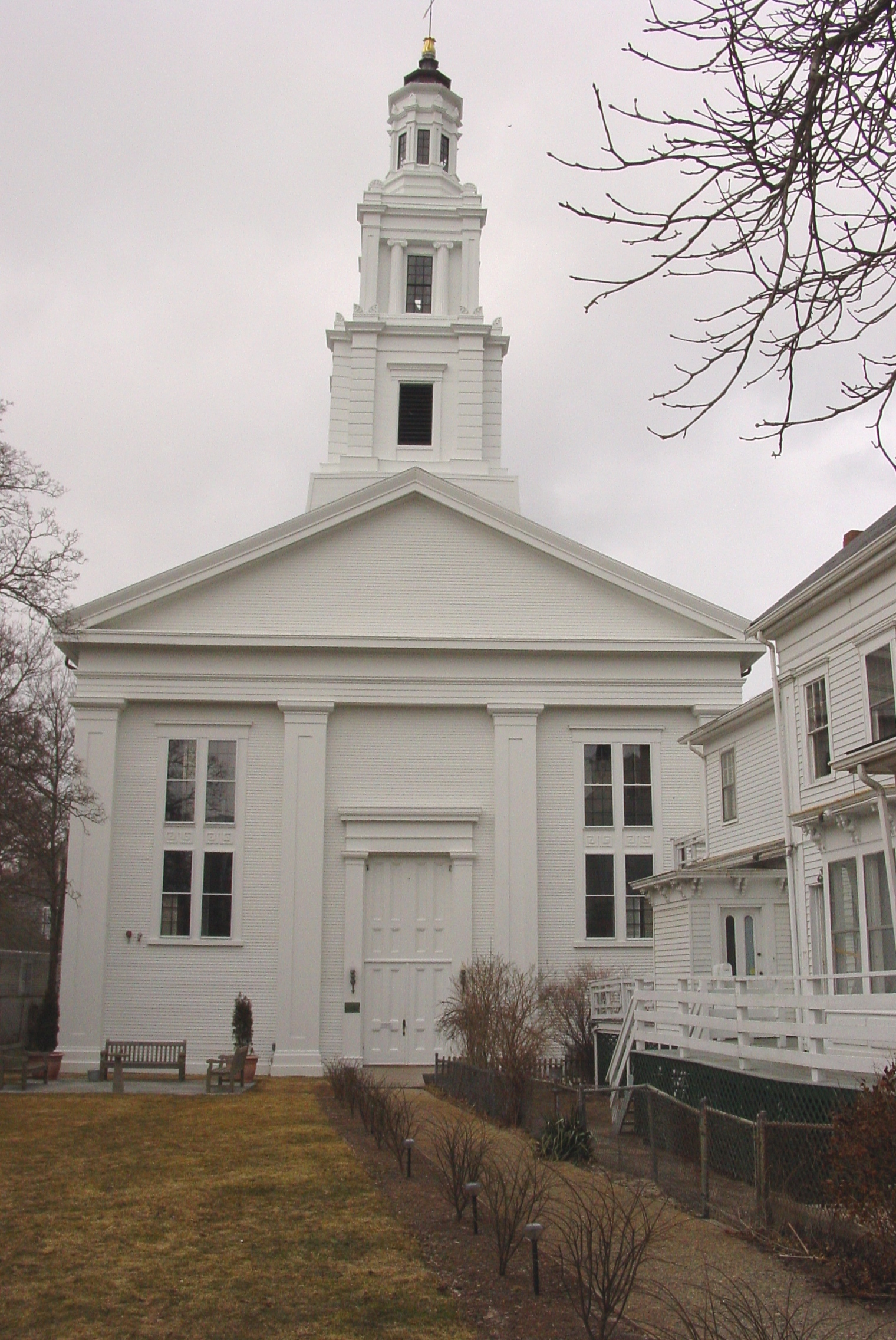
- First Universalist Church (photo taken in 2007)

- Location within Cape Cod
- Location: Provincetown, Massachusetts
- Coordinates: 42°3′2″N 70°11′13″W
- Area: 300 acres (120 ha)
- Architectural style: Mid 19th Century Revival, Georgian, Federal
- NRHP reference No.: 89001148
- Added to NRHP: August 30, 1989

The Provincetown Historic District encompasses most of the dense urban center of Provincetown, Massachusetts. The district is roughly bounded to the north by U.S. Route 6; to the west by the west end of Commercial St.; to the south by Provincetown Harbor; and to the east by the southeast end of Commercial St. It covers about 300 acres (120 ha), and includes more than 1,000 buildings. Its historic character spans more than 200 years of settlement, from the city's early years as a fishing community, to its development as a summer resort area and artists' colony beginning in the late 19th century. The district was listed in the National Register of Historic Places in 1989. Four properties in the district are also individually listed.

== First Universalist Church ==
The First Universalist Church, built in 1847, is the oldest church in Provincetown. Its "Christopher Wren" tower is thought to have been inspired by the famous English architect. It is now called the Unitarian Universalist Meeting House.

== Center Methodist Church (former) ==
The Center Methodist Church church building is the current home of the Provincetown Public Library and former home of the town Heritage Museum.

== Provincetown Public Library (former) ==
The former Provincetown Public Library building remained on the National Register after the library moved in 2005 to the Center Methodist Church, above.

== Provincetown Post Office ==
The Provincetown Post Office Building on Commercial Street, still the town's only post office, was built in 1930. It is a brick two-story building with a loggia of three rounded arches.

== Gallery ==
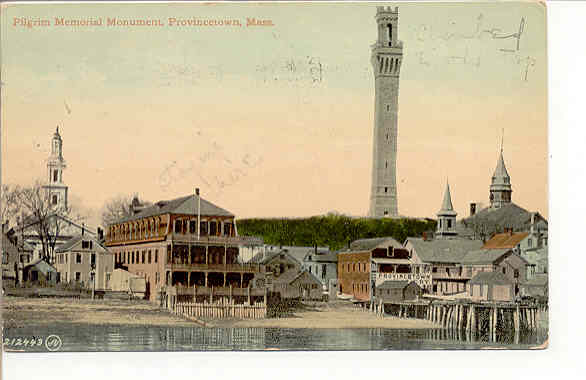
1910 postcard presenting the heart of the district and of the town.

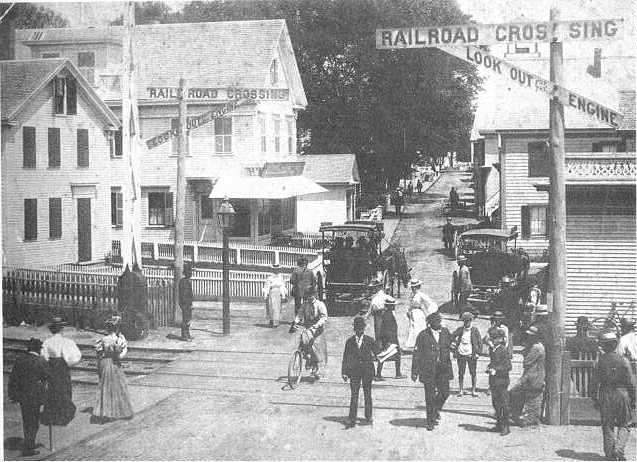
Commercial Street in the 1890s. At that time, MacMillan Pier was called Railroad Wharf.

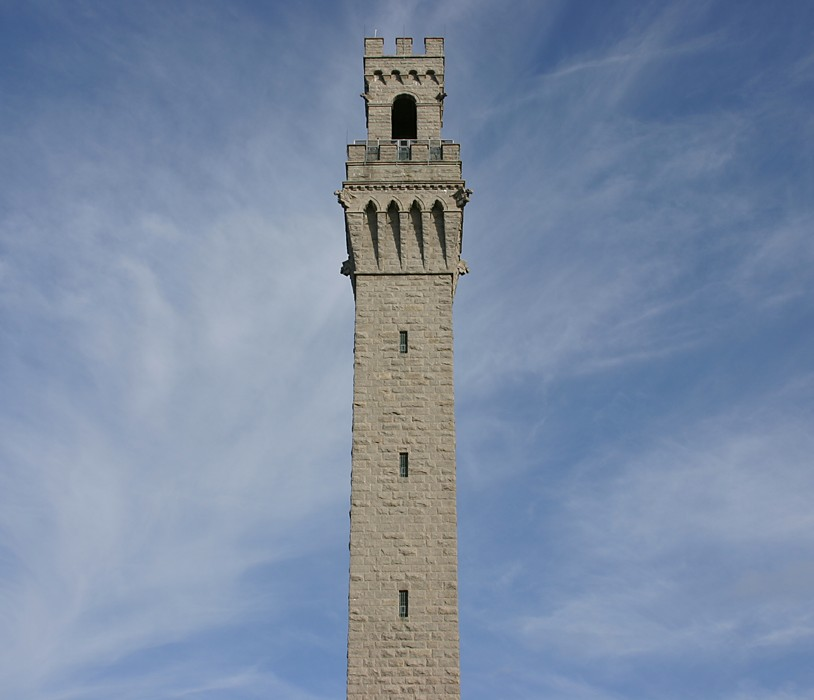
The Pilgrim Monument, designed by Willard T. Sears after the Torre del Mangia in Siena, Italy; built 1907–1910.

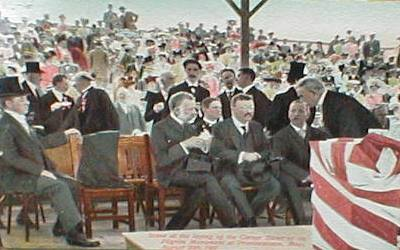
Postcard of the 1907 ceremony for the laying of the Pilgrim Monument cornerstone, with Theodore Roosevelt.

1910 postcard of the First Universalist Church

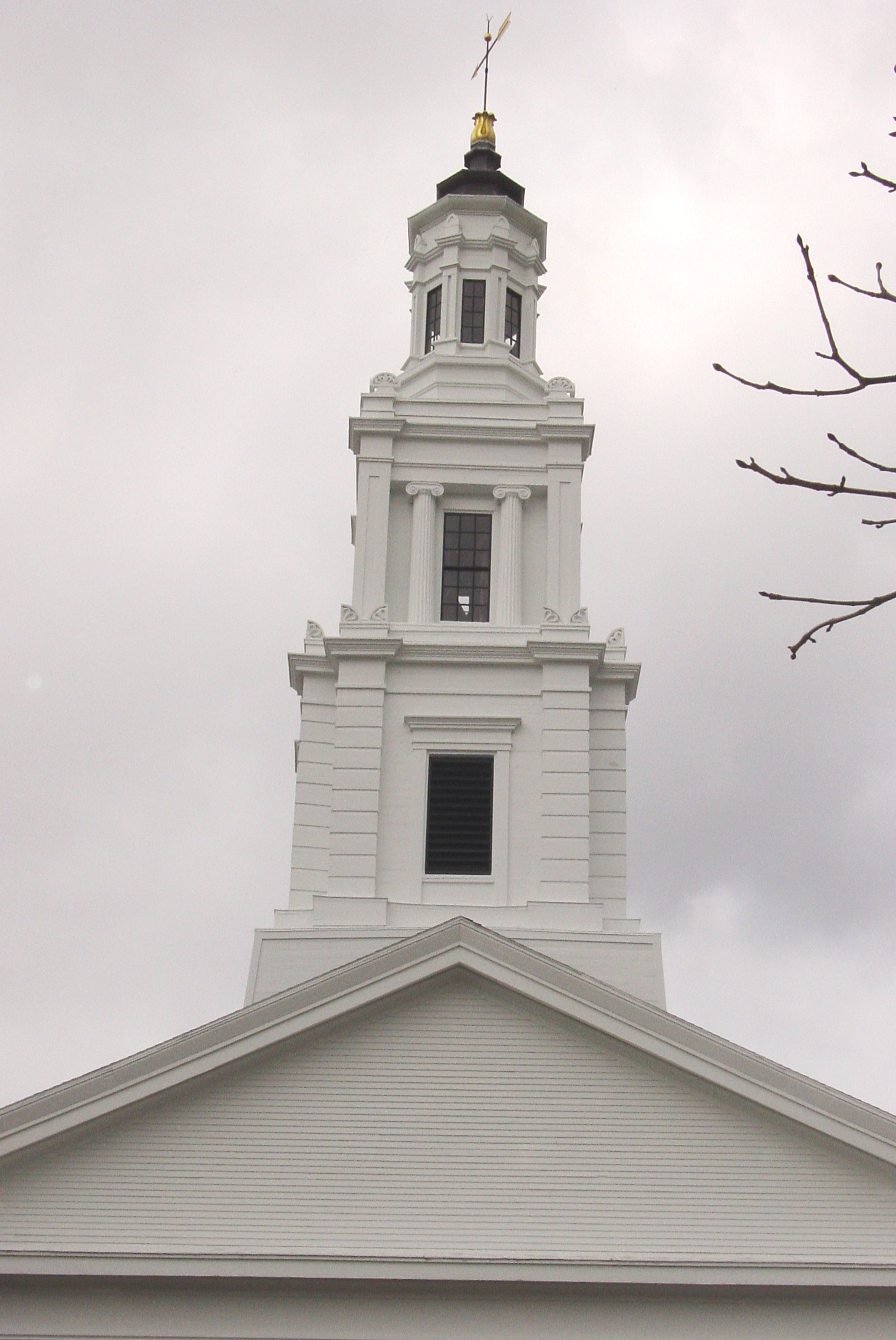
First Universalist Church's tower

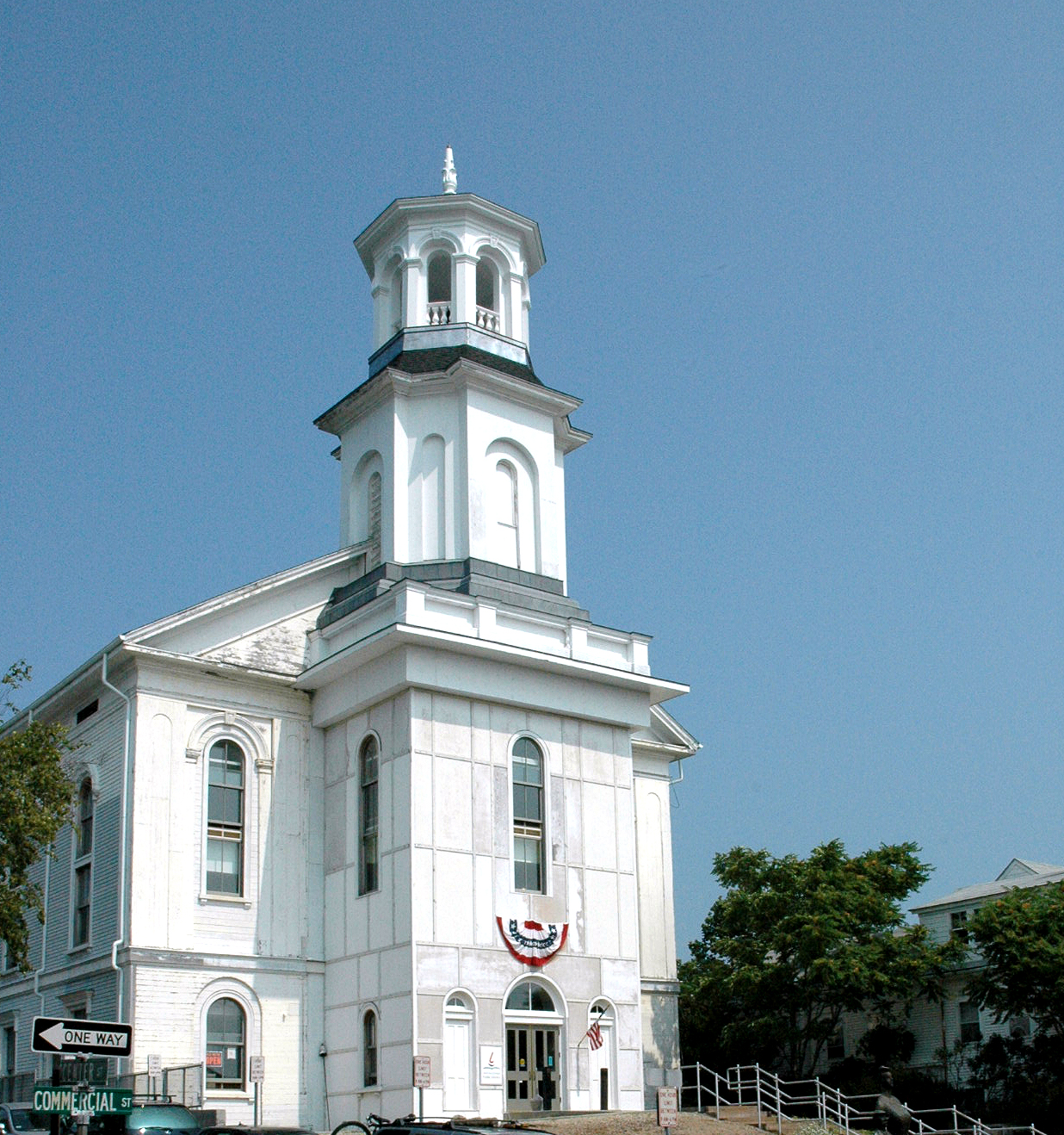
The former Center Methodist Church building in 2007

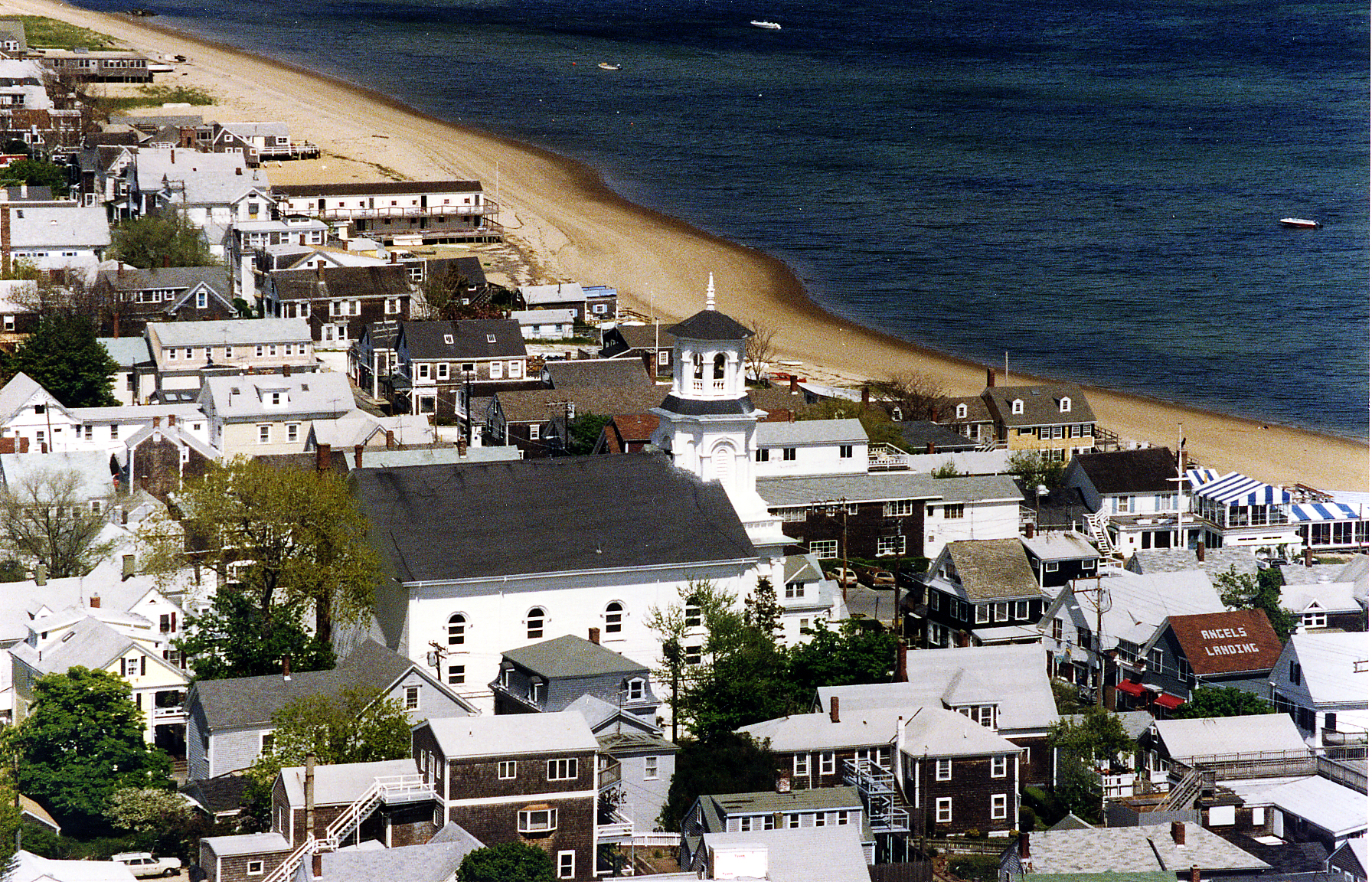
The Center Methodist Church is the most prominent building in this part of Provincetown center.

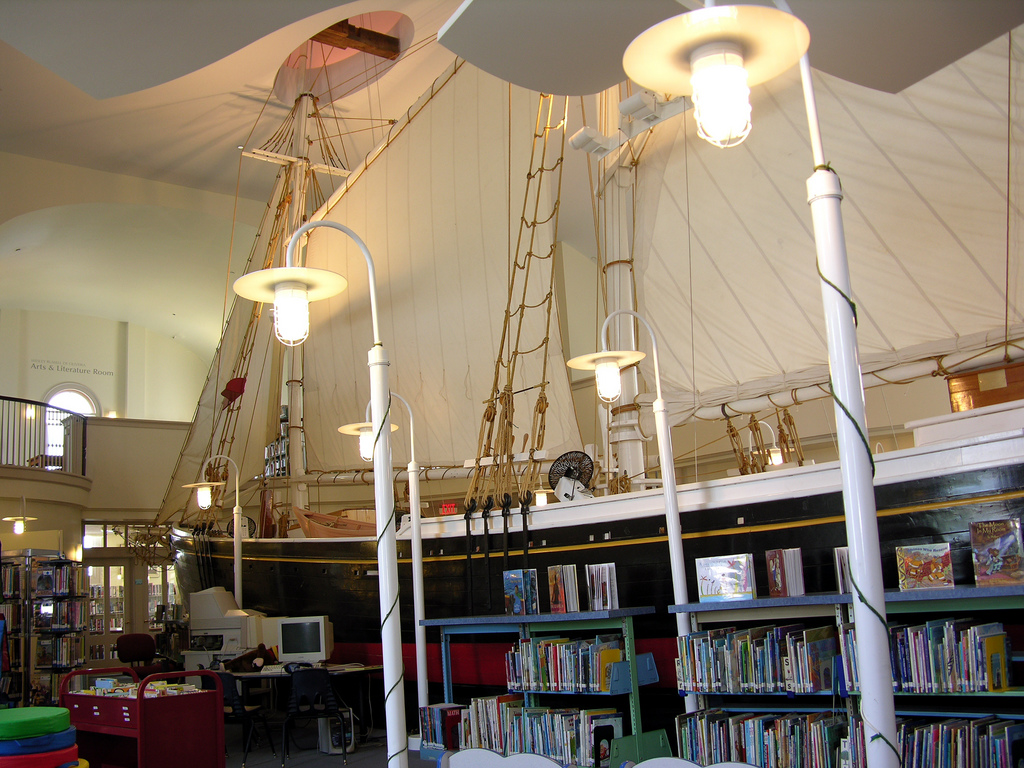
Interior of the former Center Methodist Church, remodeled to incorporate a half-scale replica of the Rose Dorothea.

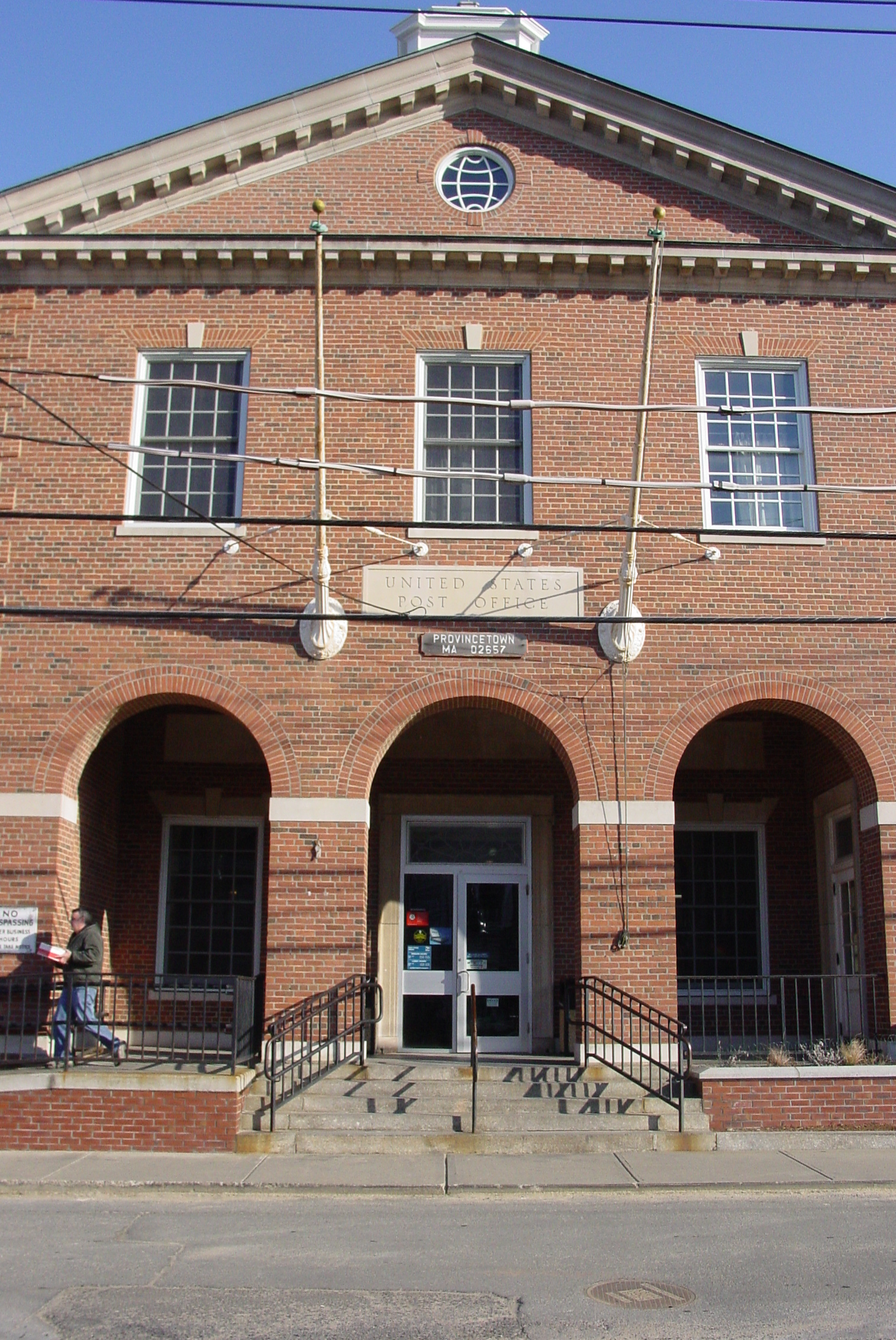
Provincetown Post Office

== See also ==
- National Register of Historic Places listings in Barnstable County, Massachusetts
