= Provincetown Harbor =

Harbor in Massachusetts, United States

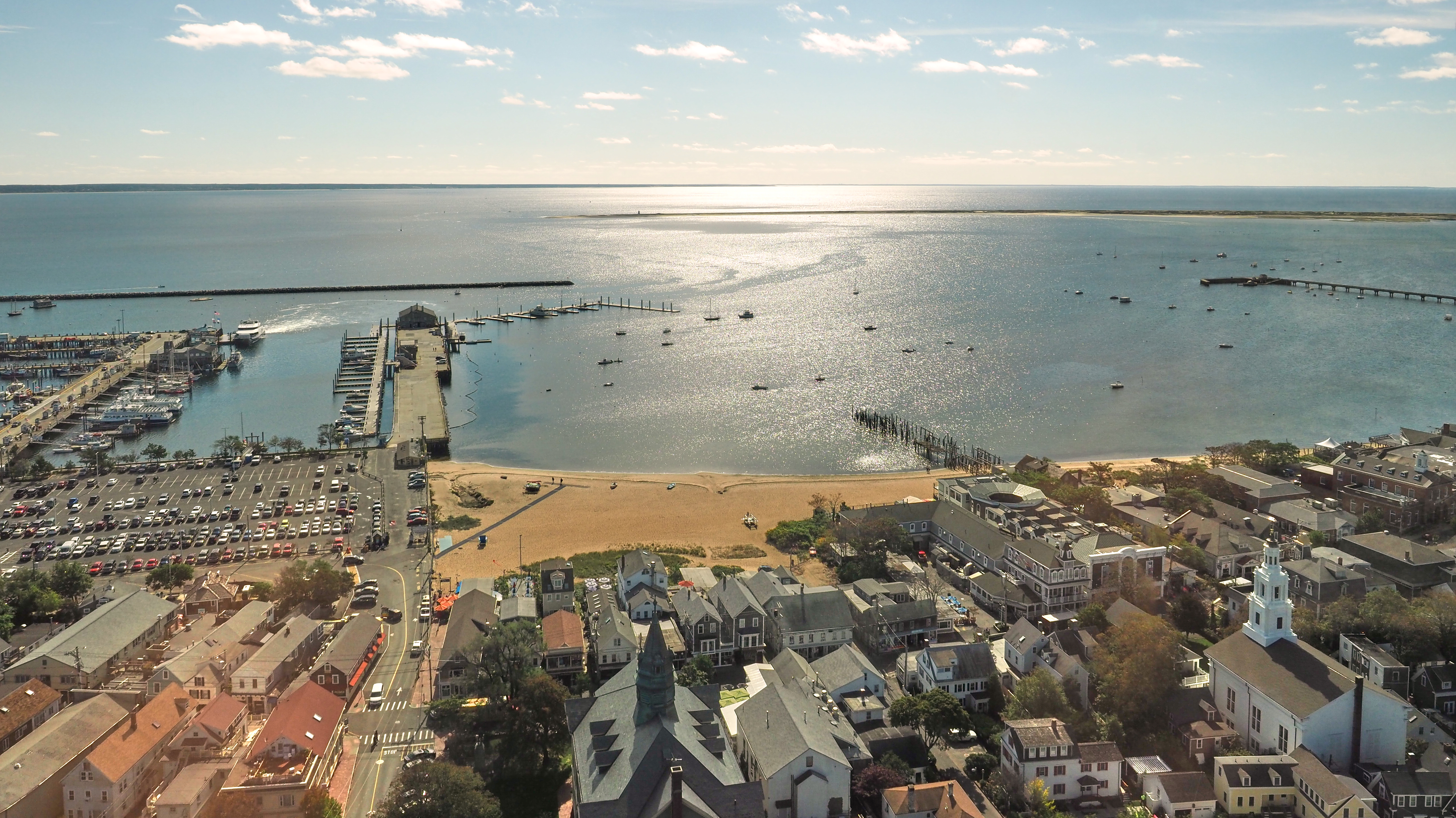
- Provincetown Harbor, looking south-east from Pilgrim Monument
- Interactive map of Provincetown Harbor
- Location within Massachusetts

Location
- Country: United States
- Location: Provincetown, Massachusetts
- Coordinates: 42.045°N 70.170°W

Provincetown Harbor is a large natural harbor located in the town of Provincetown, Massachusetts. The harbor is mostly 30 to 90 feet (9 to 27 m) deep and stretches roughly 1 mile (1.6 km) from northwest to southeast and 2 miles (3.2 km) from northeast to southwest – one large, deep basin with no dredged channel necessary for boats to enter and exit.

A tall green buoy east of Long Point (i.e., the tip of Cape Cod) marks the entrance to Provincetown Harbor from Cape Cod Bay.

== Geology ==
Glacial erosion provided source material for the Provincetown Spit.

Most of Cape Cod was created by the Laurentide Glacier between 18,000 and 15,000 years ago. However, the Provincetown Spit, i.e., the land surrounding Provincetown Harbor from High Head in North Truro through all of Provincetown, consists largely of marine deposits transported from farther up the shore during the last 6,000 years.

== History ==
Provincetown Harbor is encircled by the Provincetown Spit

Bartholomew Gosnold explored the harbor in 1602, and his mate Gabriel Archer wrote:

"The fifteenth day of May we had again sight of the land, which made ahead, being as we thought an island, by reason of a large sound that appeared westward between it and the main, for coming to the west end thereof, we did perceive a large opening, we called it Shoal Hope. Near this cape we came to anchor in fifteen fathoms, where we took great store of codfish, for which we altered the name, and called it Cape Cod. Here we saw sculls of herring, mackerel, and other small fish, in great abundance. This is a low sandy shoal, but without danger..."

John Smith explored the harbor in 1614 and wrote:

"Cape Cod... is only a headland of high hills of sand, overgrown with shrubby pines, hurts, and such trash, but an excellent harbor for all weathers. This Cape is made by the main sea on the one side, and a great bay on the other, in form of a sickle..."

=== Pilgrims' first landing ===
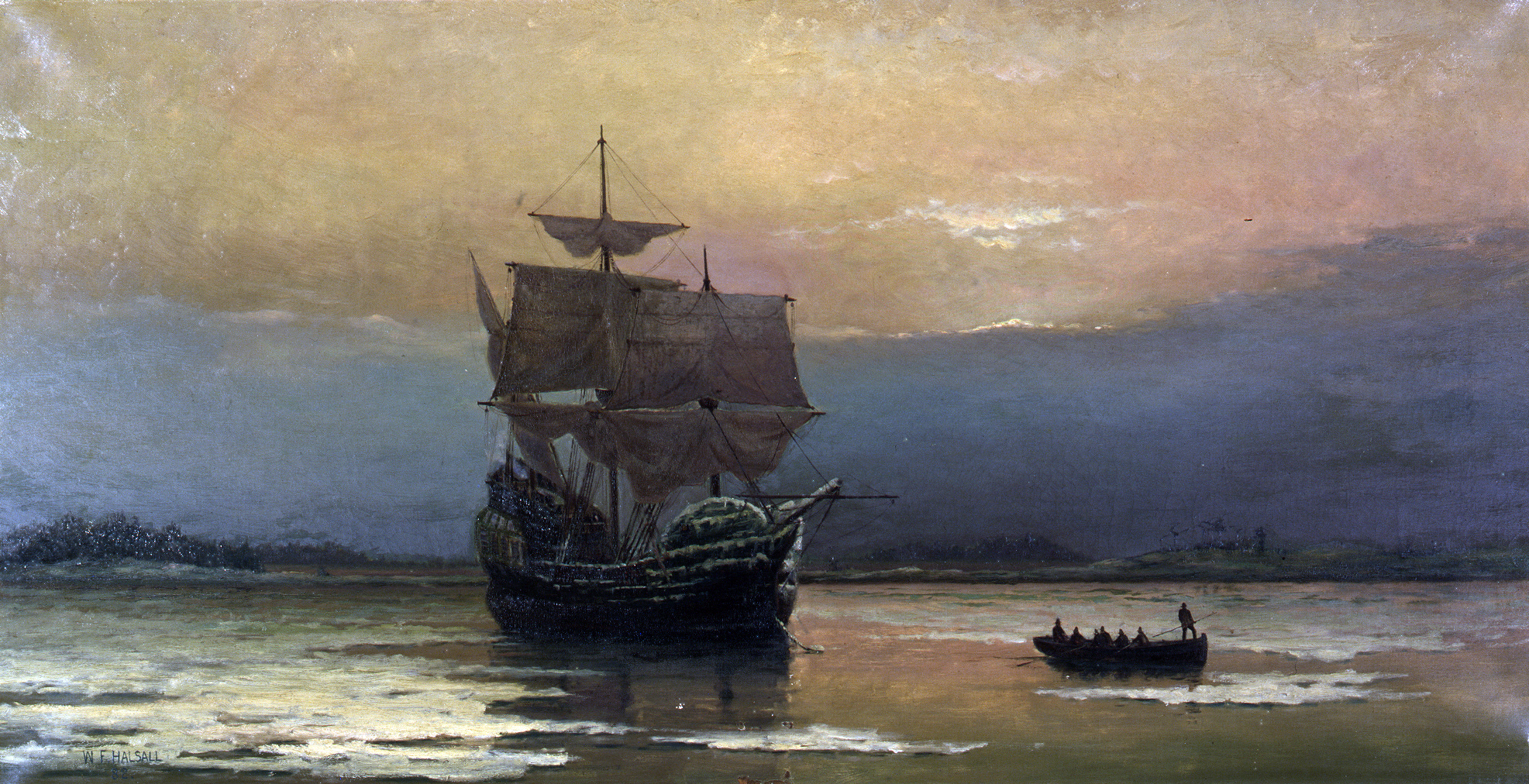
An 1882 painting of the Mayflower at anchor by William Halsall

Provincetown Harbor was the initial anchoring place of the Pilgrims traveling on the Mayflower in 1620, before they proceeded to Plymouth, Massachusetts. Thoreau later observed that Smith's description of the harbor may have been less colored by the hardships of transoceanic troubles than the Pilgrims'. Mourt's Relation describes the harbor as:

"a good harbor and pleasant bay, circled round, except in the entrance, which is about four miles (6 km) over from land to land, compassed about to the very sea with oaks, pines, juniper, sassafras, and other sweet wood; it is a harbor wherein 1000 sail of ships may safely ride, there we relieved ourselves with wood and water, and refreshed our people, while our shallop was fitted to coast the bay, to search for an habitation: there was the greatest store of fowl we ever saw."

The Mayflower held several different passengers in addition to the Pilgrims on its first transoceanic voyage. Before coming ashore at the extreme northwest corner of the harbor, the Pilgrims and other settlers signed the Mayflower Compact in the harbor on November 11, 1620. Dorothy Bradford, the first wife of William Bradford, was one of the first adult Pilgrims to die in the New World. According to the only known written description of her death from close to when it actually occurred, she fell overboard from the Mayflower in Provincetown Harbor on December 17, 1620, and drowned. Peregrine White, the first child born to the Pilgrims in New England, was born while they were in Provincetown Harbor.

=== Village of Long Point ===
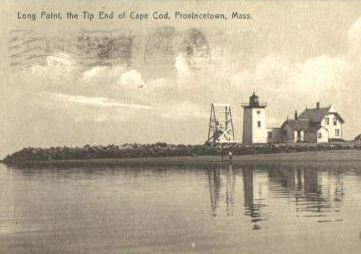
Long Point Light at the tip of Cape Cod

From 1818 until the 1850s a fishing village existed at Long Point, complete with a post office, schoolhouse, 6 windmills for saltworks, and 38 homes for about 200 adults and 60 children. When the families left in the 1850s, they floated their homes a mile across the harbor, where many still stand today.

During the American Civil War, the military established defensive artillery battery positions at this location. The Long Point Battery would come to be known as "Fort Useless" and "Fort Ridiculous" by the local residents.

Today, Long Point is a ghost village, and nothing remains save for the Long Point Light, which had been replaced by a new light in 1875.

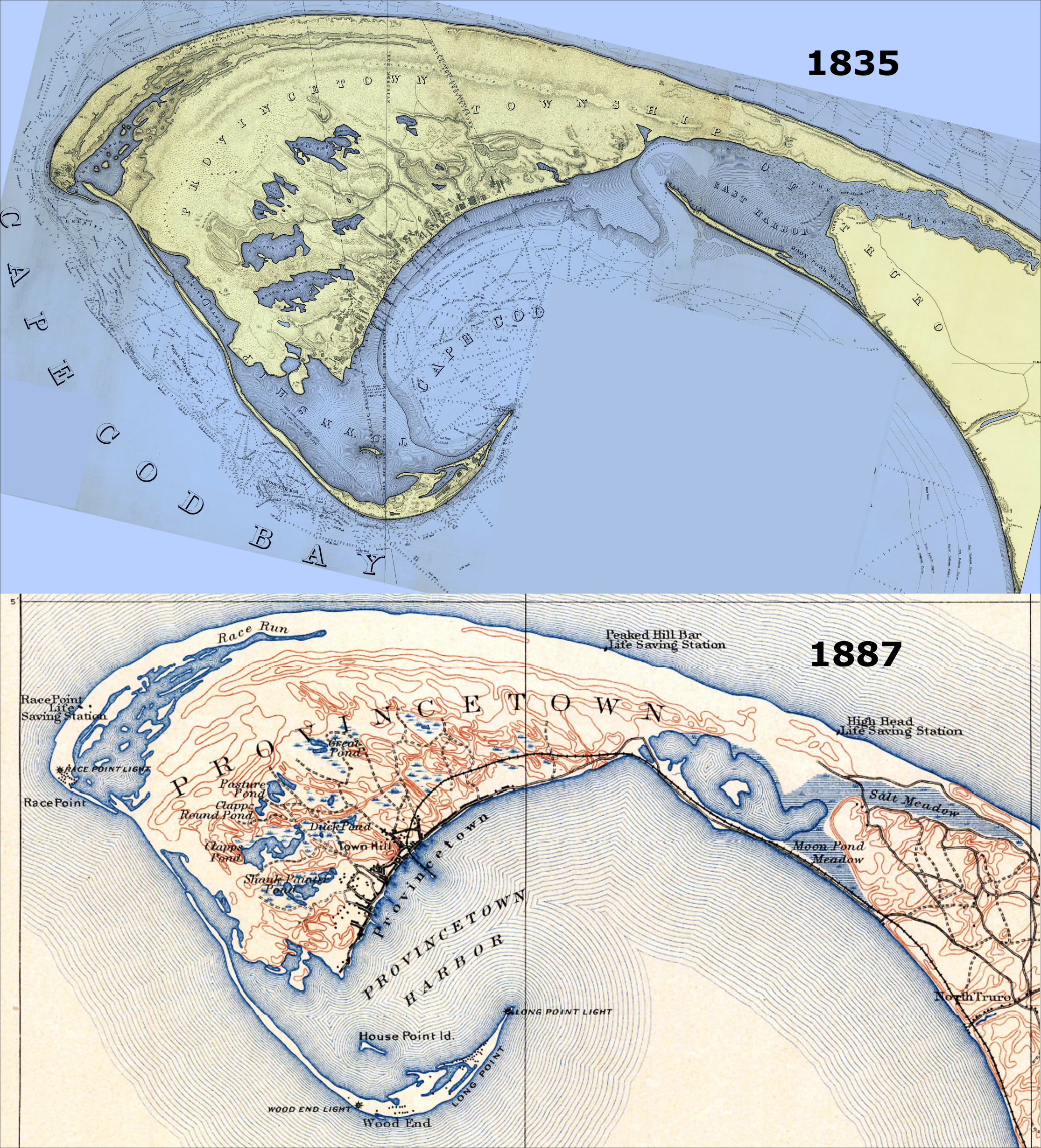
Until the late 19th century, the East Harbor was open to Provincetown Harbor. In 1868, it was closed off to make way for the railroad and the automobile. Compare these two maps from 1835 (top) and 1889 (bottom).

=== East Harbor ===
For the better part of modern history, the eastern part of Provincetown harbor was connected to yet another harbor, historically known as East Harbor. East Harbor was the most protected mooring place in the outer Cape for boats using Cape Cod Bay and the Gulf of Maine. East Harbor had a 1,000-foot-wide (305 m) inlet from Provincetown Harbor, as shown in the adjacent map from 1836.

Until the late 19th century, there was not a single road leading in or out of Provincetown – the only land route connecting Provincetown to points beyond was along a thin stretch of beach along the shore to the north (locally called the "backshore"). A wooden bridge was erected over the East Harbor in 1854, only to be destroyed by a winter storm and ice two years later. Although the bridge was replaced the following year, a traveler using it still had to traverse several miles over a sand route, which, along with the backshore route, would occasionally be washed out by storms. This made Provincetown much like an island, in that it relied almost entirely upon its harbor for its communication, travel, and commerce needs.

In 1868 the mouth of the East Harbor was diked, to facilitate the laying of track for the arrival of the railroad; the wooden bridge and sand road were finally replaced by a formal roadway in 1877, as shown in the accompanying map from 1887. The East Harbor thus became a lake, connected to Provincetown Harbor only through a culvert in the dike, and in 1910, the U.S. Geologic Survey (USGS) officially renamed it Pilgrim Lake.

In the ensuing years, the dike became clogged with vegetation, beginning a trend of desalination and oxygen-depletion that resulted in the demise of native wildlife populations, occasionally in the form of fish kills. In 2004, tidal flow was successfully restored by the National Park Service, working together with other local, state, and federal agencies. In the following year, for the first time since Abraham Lincoln was president, legal-size clams were found in East Harbor. In 2008, the USGS officially renamed Pilgrim Lake, restoring the original appellation of East Harbor.

=== Other history ===
The Portland gale of 1898 destroyed several wharves and fishing vessels within the harbor.

In 2002, Provincetown Harbor Beach was selected by the US Environmental Protection Agency as one of three Flagship beaches for the state of Massachusetts that serve as models for beach managers in water quality monitoring and pollution assessments and because of its health.

The harbor is the southern boundary of the Provincetown historic district, which is on the National Register of Historic Places.

== Landmarks ==
Two main parallel wharves dominated the center of the harbor in the late 19th century: Railroad Wharf and Steamboat Wharf. President Grant visited Provincetown for the opening of the railroad in 1874. Today, the wharves have been replaced by piers. Although rail and steamboat service to Provincetown both ended long ago, ferry service continues.

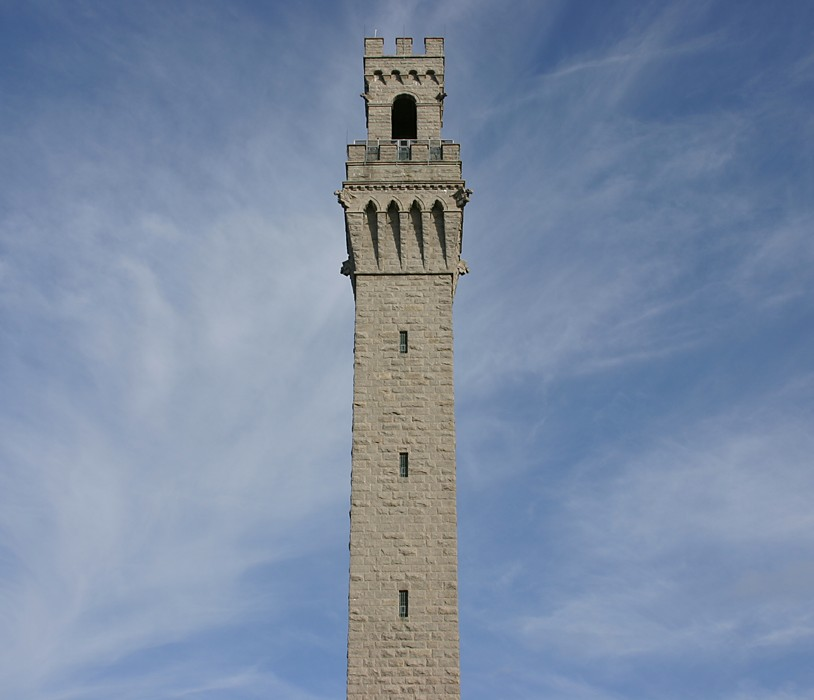
The Pilgrim Monument, designed by Willard T. Sears after the Torre del Mangia in Siena, Italy; built 1907–1910.

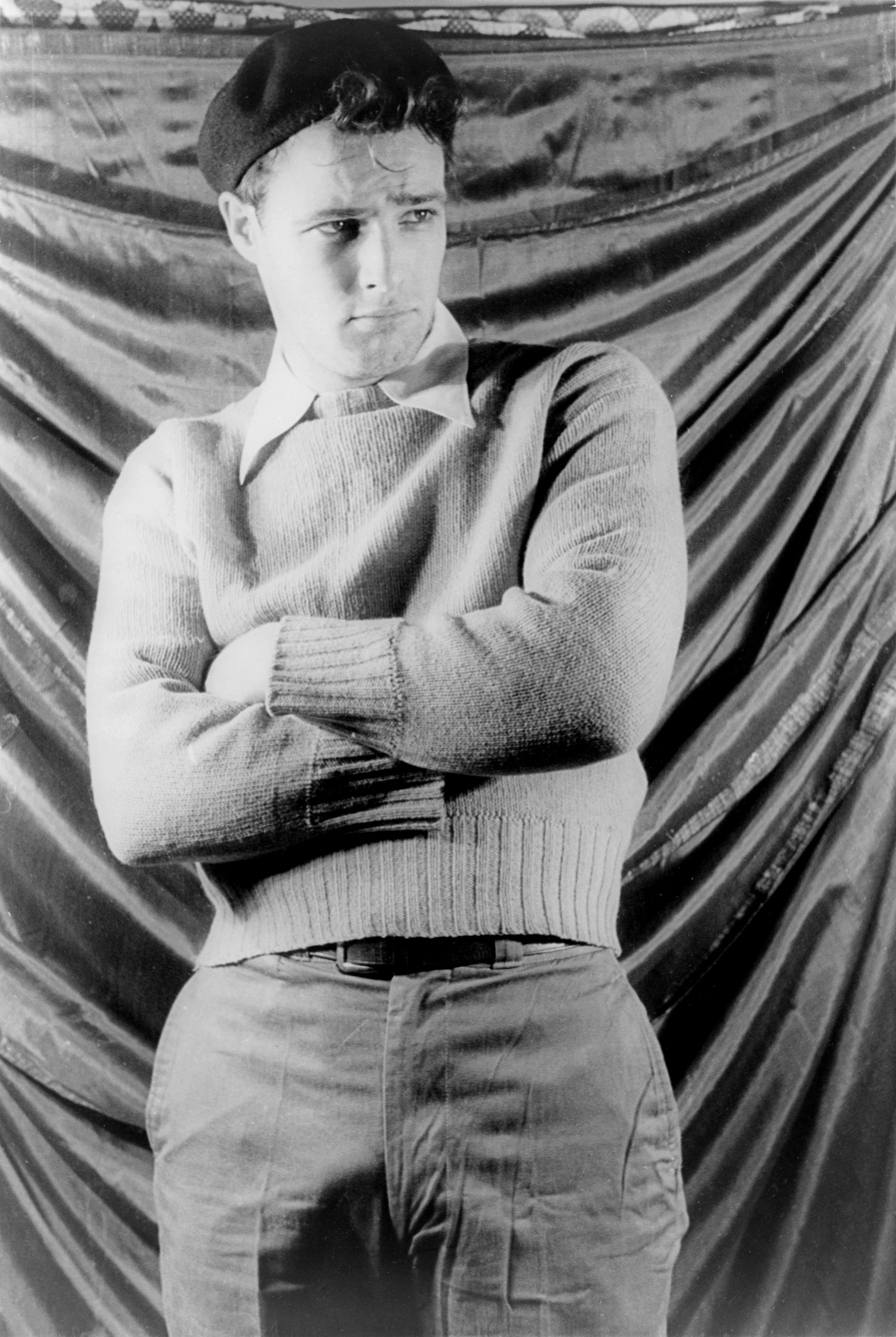
Marlon Brando in A Streetcar Named Desire, photographed by Carl Van Vechten, 1948

They Also Faced the Sea by Ewa Nogiec and Norma Holt. Coast Guard pier with motor life boat are at left in the higher-resolution version.

MacMillan Pier, the town pier of Provincetown, was significantly renovated and expanded during 2003-2005 with the help of a $1.95 million low interest loan from the Rural Development program of the U.S. Department of Agriculture. The pier primarily serves tourists and high-speed ferries to Boston and Plymouth that charge their passengers up to $44 per one-way trip. The Provincetown Public Pier Corporation (PPPC) entered into a 20-year lease agreement for MacMillan Pier operations in 2005. The pier is named after arctic explorer Donald B. MacMillan, a Provincetown native who retired to Provincetown and died there in 1970.

Immediately parallel to MacMillan Pier is Fisherman's Wharf, also known to locals as Cabral's Pier. They Also Faced the Sea is an outdoor art installation of five large portraits of local Portuguese-American women photographed by Norma Holt hanging since 2003 on one side and one end of the old fish-packing plant on Cabral Pier.

In both 1907 and 1910, when the Pilgrim Monument began construction and when it was dedicated, the entire Atlantic fleet of the U.S. Navy was inside the harbor for large ceremonies led by Presidents Theodore Roosevelt and William Howard Taft, respectively.

In addition to a panoramic view of the whole town, the harbor affords views of three working lighthouses: Long Point Light, Wood End Light, and Highland (or Cape Cod) Light. All three are on land within the Cape Cod National Seashore. The harbor serves as the southern boundary of the nationally registered Provincetown historic district, which consists of some 3,000 acres (12 km^{2}), 1127 buildings, three structures, and five objects.

On the East End of Provincetown, Lewis Wharf was purchased by Mary Heaton Vorse, and its old fish shack converted into a theater which became the home of the Provincetown Players. Eugene O'Neill debuted his first play, Bound East for Cardiff, there in 1916.

Captain Jack's Wharf is on the West End of Provincetown. At another theater on that wharf, Tennessee Williams debuted A Streetcar Named Desire with Marlon Brando as Stanley Kowalski before the play appeared on Broadway.

U.S. Coast Guard has administrative buildings and barracks at the base of a concrete pier on the harbor. The current station opened in 1979 and is responsible for safety and law enforcement in over 1,200 square miles (3,100 km^{2}) of Cape Cod Bay and the Atlantic Ocean. Noteworthy past disasters within this station's area include the wreck of the submarine S-4 in 1927. This station includes the first federal building to receive solar power. A frequent sight in the harbor is the station's 47-foot Motor Lifeboat.

The West End Breakwater, built in 1911 by the US Army Corps of Engineers, is open to the public for walking and exploring. Technically speaking, it is more of a dike than a breakwater. The harbor also has a "true" breakwater built between 1970 and 1972 and located 835 feet (255 m) from the end of MacMillan Pier.

== Marine life ==
Provincetown Harbor supports a wide variety of marine life from algae, seagrasses and plankton through bryozoa, hydroids, echinoderms, crustaceans, mollusks, fish, birds, marine mammals, and other animals.

The harbor is an amazingly diverse and productive habitat. The following tables list in no particular order 94 examples of marine life that are regularly observed within the harbor. A few landbirds are included that are common around MacMillan Pier, on the beaches, and on the breakwater.

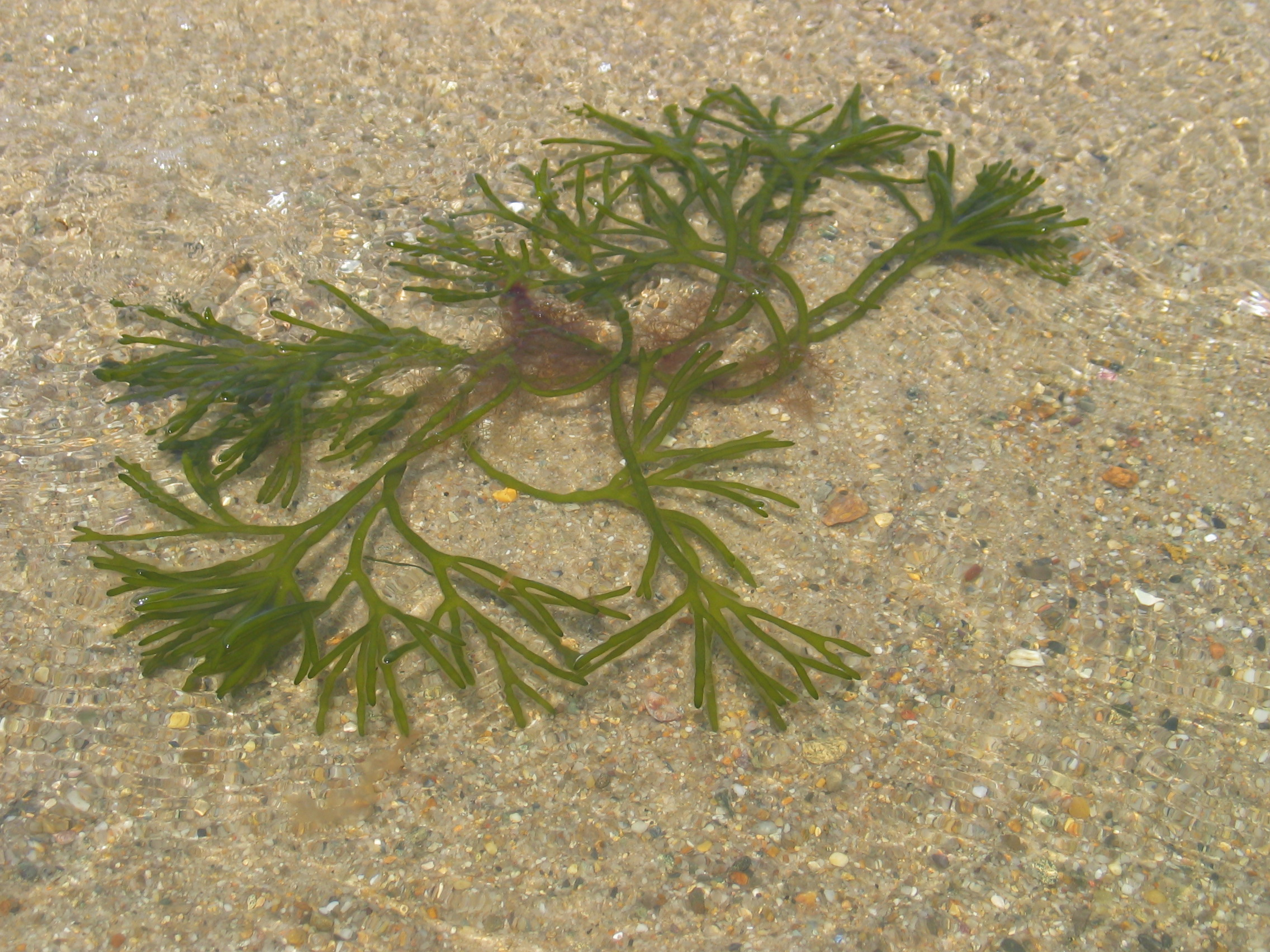
dead man's fingers

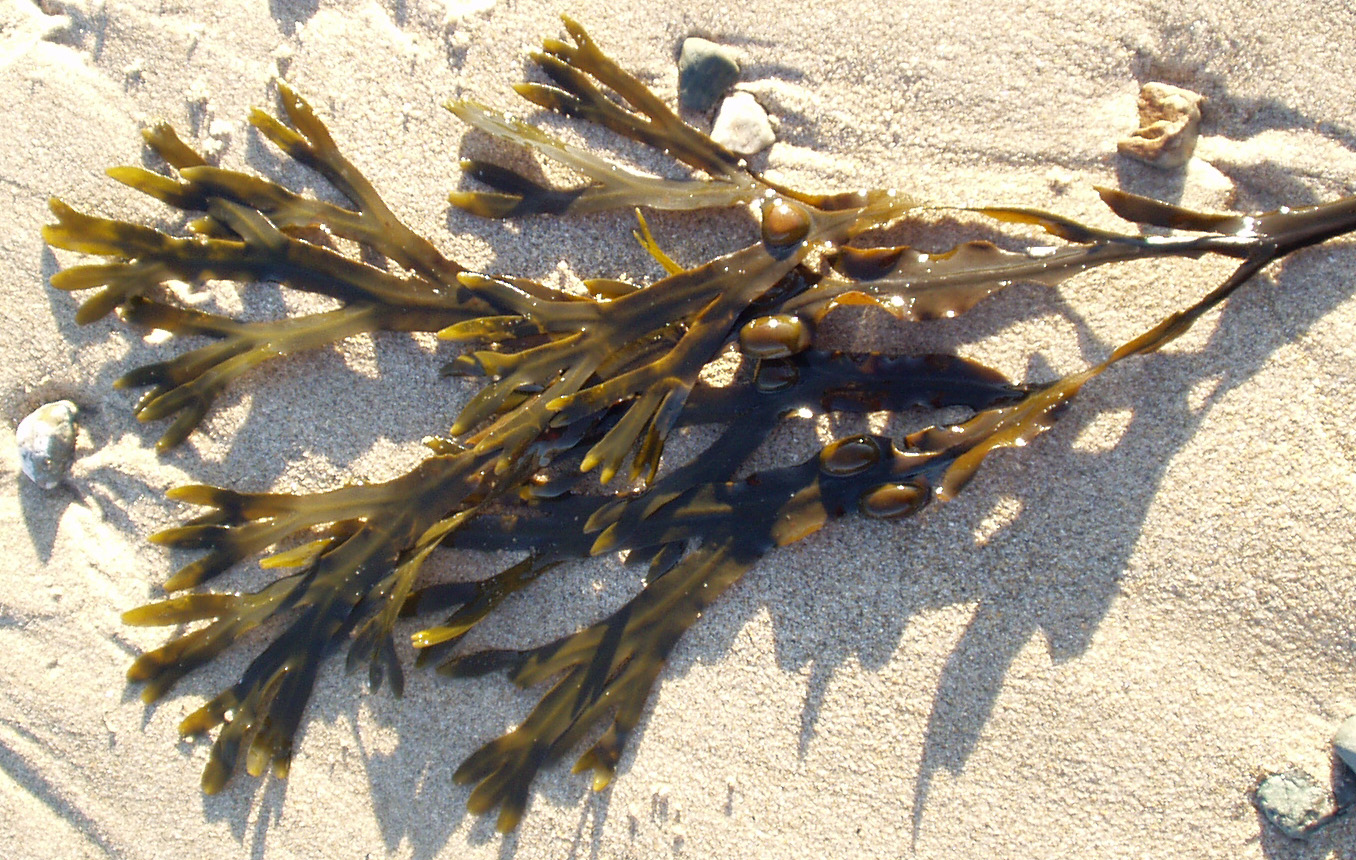
bladder wrack

Seaweeds
Ulva (sea lettuce)
Irish moss (Chondrus crispus)
Pylaiella (mung)
bladder wrack
knotted wrack
codium fragile (dead man's fingers)

American lobster

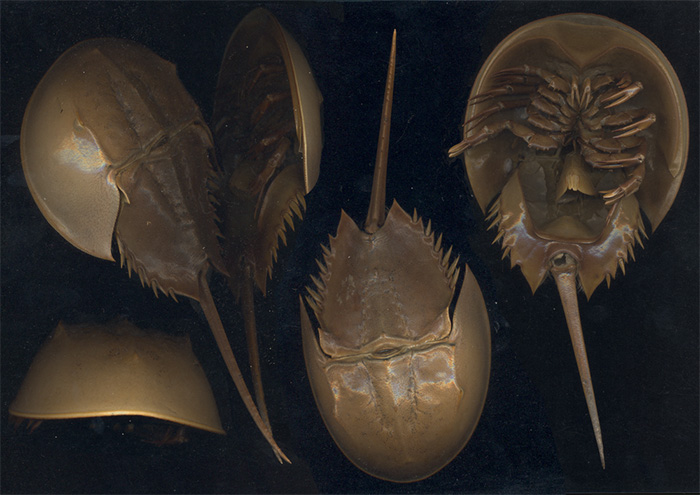
Atlantic horseshoe crab

Crustaceans, chelicerates, molluscs	Other invertebrates
American lobster	orange-footed sea cucumber
rock crab	Forbes' sea star
jonah crab	Atlantic purple sea urchin
portly spider crab	ctenophore (comb jelly)
calico crab (lady crab)	moon jelly
green crab	various sea sponges
Japanese shore crab	clam worm
long-clawed hermit crab	northern red anemone
flat-clawed hermit crab	stalked sea squirt
copepod	sea grape
gammarid amphipod (sideswimmer)	Didemnum sp.
isopod	chain tunicates
barnacle	golden star tunicates
skeleton shrimp	lacy crusted bryozoa
Atlantic horseshoe crab	tubeworm
longfin inshore squid	brittle-star
common slipper shell	salp
quahog (hard clam)	spiral tufted bryozoa
soft-shell clam (steamer)	snail fur
Atlantic bay scallop	tubularian hydroids
Eastern oyster (American oyster)	sinistral spiral tubeworm
common periwinkle	featherduster worm
northern moon snail	ice cream cone worm
oyster drill	
Eastern mudsnail	
blue mussel	

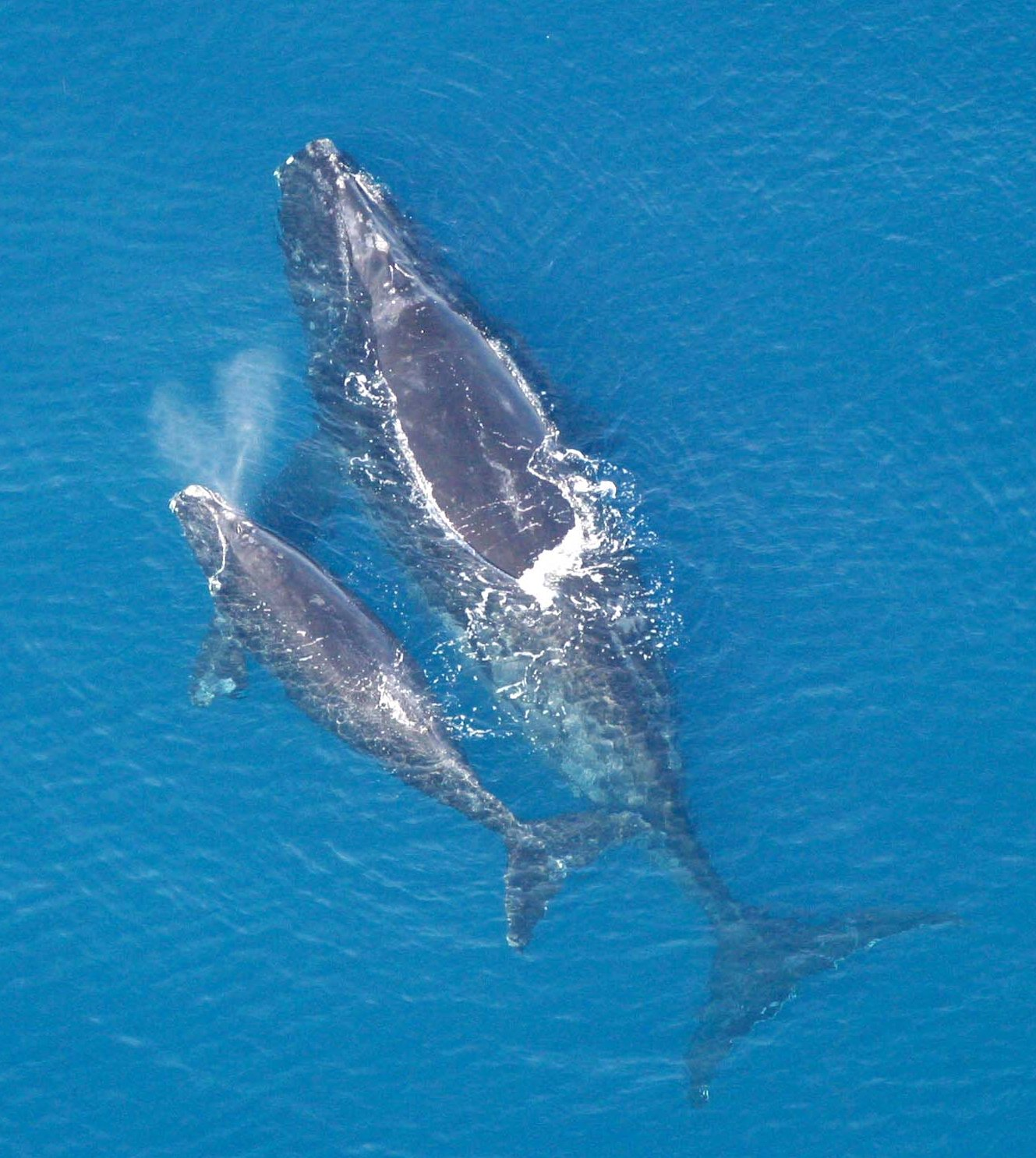
North Atlantic right whales

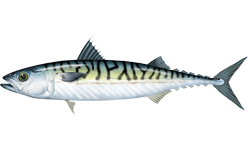
Atlantic mackerel

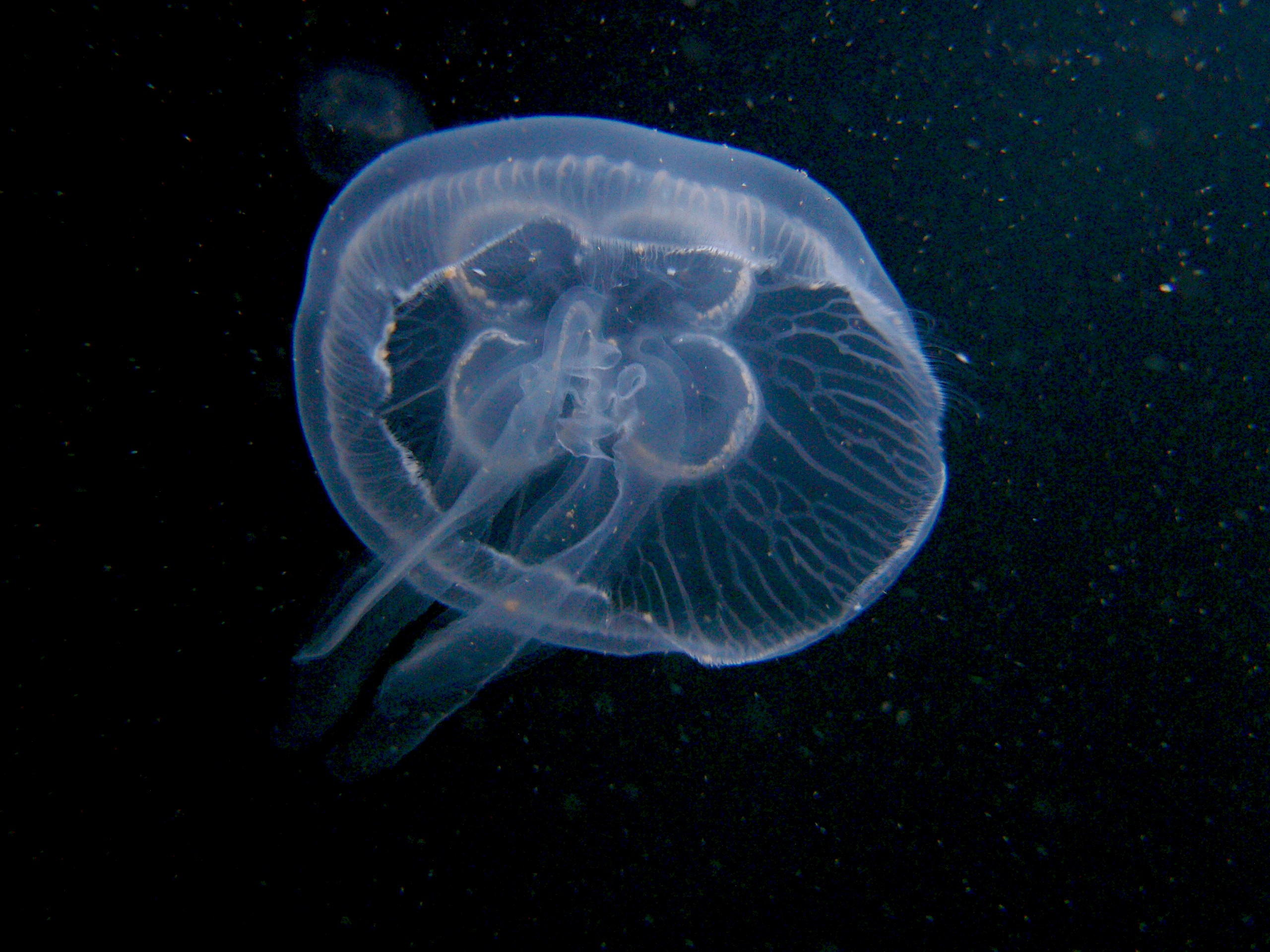
moon jelly

Fish	Birds	Marine mammals
flounder (fluke)	American herring gull	Atlantic white-sided dolphin
striped bass	great black-backed gull	harbor porpoise
bluefish	double-crested cormorant	harbor seal
Atlantic mackerel	great cormorant	grey seal
spiny dogfish	common eider	North Atlantic right whale
tautog	rock pigeon	humpback whale
cunner (bergall)	house sparrow	Minke whale
pipefish	black-crowned night-heron	fin whale
lumpfish (lumpsucker)	great blue heron	
American eel	green heron	
cusk eel	ruddy turnstone	
Atlantic herring	northern gannet	
three-spined stickleback	Wilson's storm-petrel	
black sea bass	laughing gull	
little skate	ring-billed gull	
basking shark	common tern	
Atlantic bluefin tuna	least tern	
sculpin	American crow	
sand lance	sanderling	
scup (porgy)	great shearwater	
ling cod		
ocean sunfish		

== Historic annual events ==
The Great Provincetown Schooner Regatta each September preserves the harbor's history as a great sailing port.

A Blessing of the Fleet ceremony is held at the end of MacMillan Pier in late June, when all the boats operating in the harbor are blessed by a visiting bishop as part of the Provincetown Portuguese Festival.

The Swim for Life occurs each September since 1988, which is a swim across the harbor to raise funds and awareness of HIV/AIDS, women's health and community health.

== Commercial use ==
Dorothy Bradford, steamship ferry service to Boston, 1922 postcard.

Roughly a dozen fishing trawlers (locally known as "draggers"), ferries to Boston and Plymouth, Massachusetts, several different sportfishing boats, boat rentals, and other commercial boats also use the harbor today.

East Coast whale watching on Stellwagen Bank originated as a joint effort of the Dolphin Fleet and the Center for Coastal Studies leaving from MacMillan Pier in 1975. In addition, other tour boat operators offer a variety of tours of and from the harbor, including historical sightseeing tours, harbor marine life tours, sunset cruises and more.

== Further reading and other information ==
- Wikipedia List of Nationally Registered Historic Places in Provincetown
- Oldale, R. N., 1992, Cape Cod and the Islands, the geologic story: Parnassus Imprints, East Orleans, Massachusetts, 208 p. see Geologic History of Cape Cod, Massachusetts
- Carl Christian Rafn, 1837. Antiquitates Americanæ. referred to by The Norse Wall House
- Strahler, A. N., 1966, A Geologist's View of Cape Cod: Doubleday. Reprinted Parnassus Imprints (1988), Orleans, Massachusetts, 115 p.
- Vorse, M.H. Time and the Town: A Provincetown Chronicle. 1942. Dial Press, New York, 372 p.
- a Norma Holt exhibit in "Faces & Places"
- "Shutterbug" 1999 interview with Norma Holt
- Things to Do compiled by Provincetown Public Pier Corporation
- Provincetown Chamber of Commerce has information about annual events, plus tourist information such as cruises and tours of the harbor.
- old postcard of Captain Jack's wharf in West End
