= Northern Farm (book) =

1948 book by Henry Beston

Northern Farm: A Chronicle of Maine
- First edition cover
- Author: Henry Beston
- Illustrator: Thoreau MacDonald
- Language: English
- Genre: Non-fiction
- Publisher: Rinehart & Company
- Publication date: 1948
- Publication place: United States

Northern Farm: A Chronicle of Maine is a 1948 book by naturalist/writer Henry Beston. Originally written for The Progressive as a series of columns on country-living, it chronicles a season on a small Maine farm. Beston is also the author of The Outermost House. Northern Farm has been less commercially successful but still important as environmental writing and popular among Mainers.

Published in 1948, it is a series of short essays inspired by his life and observations at Chimney Farm, an 88-acre farm in Nobleboro that Beston and his wife, the late poet Elizabeth Coatsworth, purchased in 1931. ... It has long been out of print, except for a facsimile edition published in 2006 to raise funds for the preservation of the farm property, which in 2007 was placed on the National Register of Historic Places.

== Annie Dillard's journal entry ==
The Pulitzer Prize winner Annie Dillard made a journal entry concerning Northern Farm:

It was a bore. Not only did nothing happen, okay, but there was no trace of mind. As a naturalist he didn't teach me a thing. He didn't even bother to look up fireflies. As an observer of the social scene, which is a boring thing to be in the 1st place, he's ordinary and conservative. No imagination.
