= Gary Lawless =

American writer

- Born: 1951 (age 74–75); Belfast, Maine, U.S.
- Education: Colby College
- Occupations: poet, writer
- Spouse: Beth Leonard
- Writing career
- Language: English

Gary Lawless (born 1951) is an American poet and businessperson from Maine. He has written and published several collections of poems, and has owned Gulf of Maine Books, in Brunswick, Maine, since 1979.

== Early life ==
Lawless was born in 1951 in Belfast, Maine, to Richard "Jake" Lawless and Ruth Dow. Growing up, he got to know "local eccentric", poet Bern Porter. Lawless graduated from Colby College in Waterville, Maine, in 1973. He spent the following year studying with poet Gary Snyder in California, where he met writers and political activists such as Jerry Brown and Daniel Ellsberg. Lawless and Snyder lived in the Sierra Nevada mountains.

== Career ==
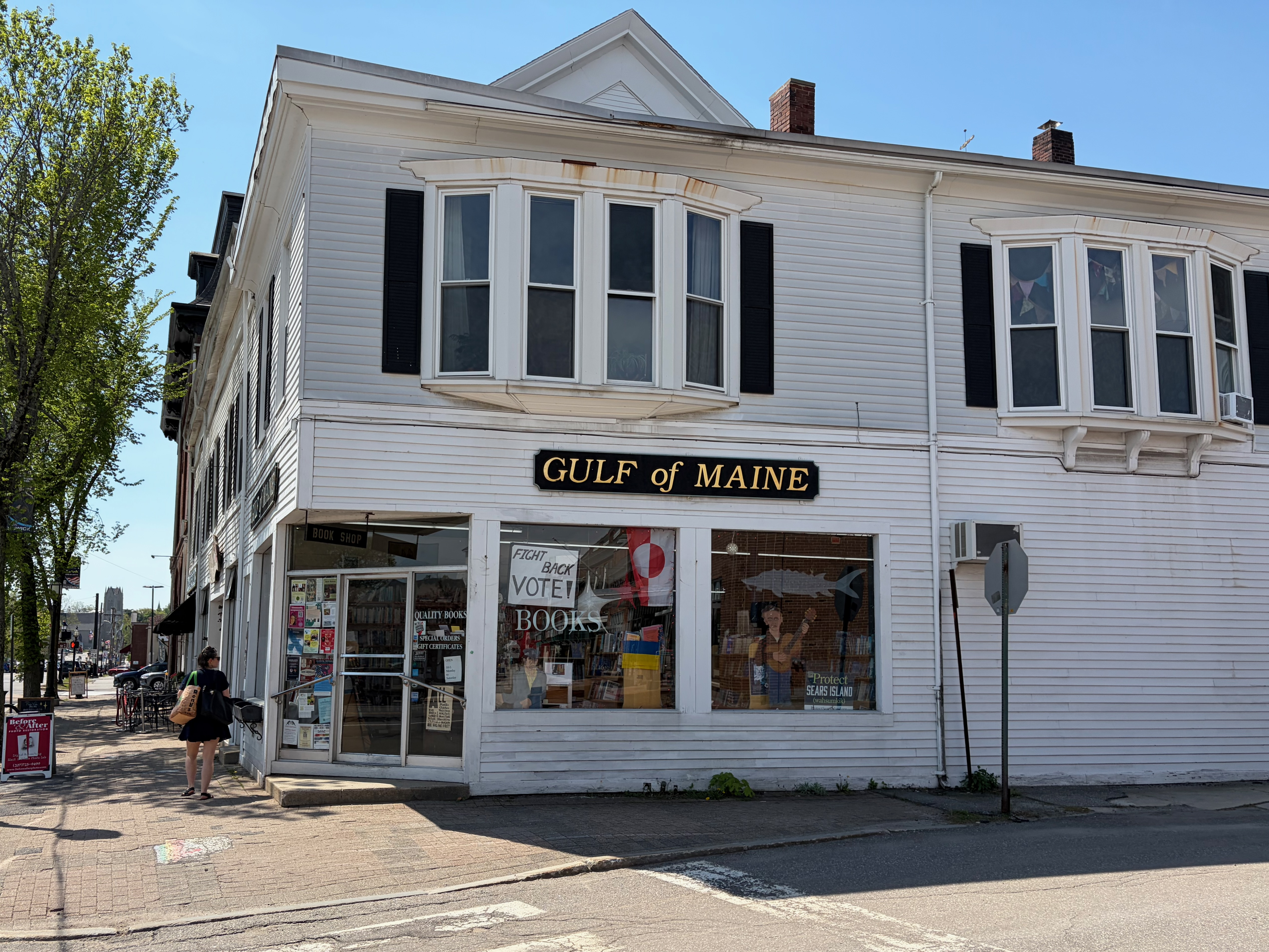
Gulf of Maine Books (2026)

In 1979, Lawless became co-founder (with his now-wife) of Gulf of Maine Books, a bookstore on Maine Street in Brunswick, Maine. He also established Blackberry Books, a publishing company. Before opening his own bookstore, he worked the register at Bookland in Lewiston, Maine, and then at Cook's Corner. It was at the first location where his manager, poet James Koller, taught him the basics of book publishing.

In 1987, Lawless organized a Gulf of Maine Bioregional Congress, a four-day focus on workshops and presentations with people from northern New England and eastern Canada.

Lawless has been poet-in-residence of Sitka, Alaska, and for the National Park Service at Isle Royale National Park at Lake Superior.

He is an associate professor of literature at Bates College in Lewiston.

Lawless is a member of the Rewilding Institute for a Wilder World leadership council.

== Personal life ==
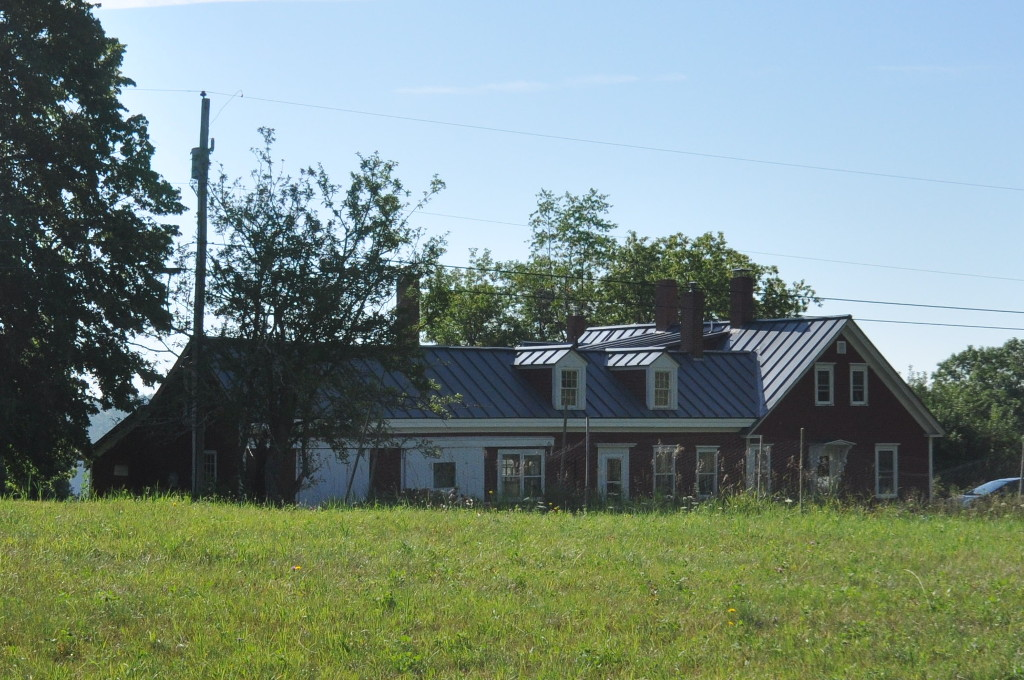
Lawless and his wife live at Chimney Farm in Nobleboro, Maine

Lawless is married to Beth Leonard, a native of Brunswick whom he met when she was a customer at Bookland. They are caretakers of Chimney Farm, a property formerly owned by Henry Beston and Elizabeth Coatsworth in Nobleboro, Maine, near Damariscotta Lake. They were alerted to its availability by future Maine poet laureate Kate Barnes, a customer at Gulf of Maine and daughter of Coatsworth, in 1987. Barnes died in 2023, and left Chimney Farm―now listed on the National Register of Historic Places—and its land to Lawless and Leonard.

In 2017, Lawless was awarded the Constance H. Carlson Public Humanities Prize, the Maine Humanities Council's top honor, for his work in "bringing poetry and the creative process to the people of Maine, his commitment to helping Mainers of every background find their voice, and his ardent devotion to the environment and to all those that inhabit it."

As of 2019, the couple had attended the Common Ground Country Fair, in Unity, Maine, for 39 consecutive years (25 of which were as its social and political focus area).

Lawless is also a musician. He plays bass guitar for the Leopard Girls.

== Selected works ==
Below is a selection from Lawless's bibliography:

- Full Flower Moon (1975)
- Gulf of Maine: A Blackberry Reader (1977)
- Poems for the Wild Earth (1994)
- In Ruins (2002)
- Caribou Planet (2015)
- How the Stones Came to Venice (2021)

He also edited and published Japanese poet Nanao Sakaki's collected poems Let's Eat Stars (1997) and How to Live in the Planet Earth (2013). They was published on Lawless's Blackberry Books.
