= Chimney Farm =

- U.S. National Register of Historic Places
- U.S. Historic district
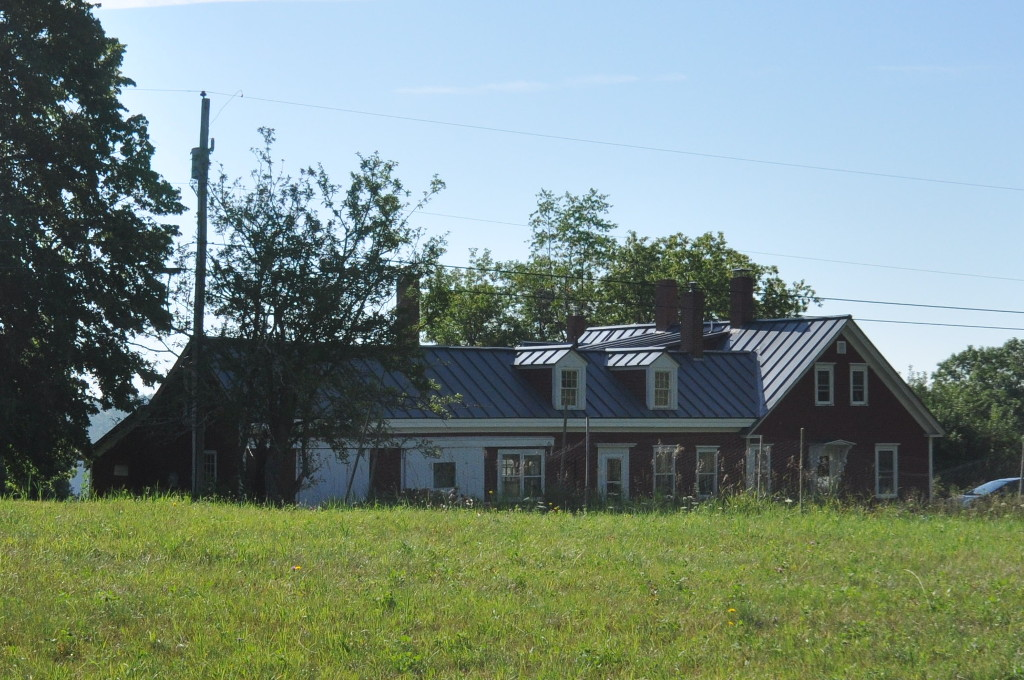

- Location within Maine Location within the United States
- Location: 617 East Neck Rd., Nobleboro, Maine
- Coordinates: 44°6′57″N 69°28′31″W
- Area: 20 acres (8.1 ha)
- Architectural style: Queen Anne
- NRHP reference No.: 07000012
- Added to NRHP: February 7, 2007

Chimney Farm is a historic farm property at 617 East Neck Road in Nobleboro, Maine. The heart of the farm is an early 19th-century farmhouse, which was from 1931 to their respective deaths home to the writers Henry Beston (1888–1968) and Elizabeth Coatsworth (1893–1986). Both were prominent regional award-winning writers, and the farm property played a prominent role on some of their writings. It was listed on the National Register of Historic Places in 2007.

== Description and history ==
Chimney Farm stands on a peninsula called East Neck, one of two that separate two lobes of Damariscotta Lake. Between the two peninsulas is a cove of the lake; the Chimney Farm property originally extended entirely across East Neck between the eastern lobe of the lake and the cove, but is now reduced to 20 acres (8.1 ha) fronting the lake. The property includes a farmhouse and barn, a small writing cabin, and a small family cemetery that includes the graves of both Henry Beston and Elizabeth Coatsworth. The farmhouse is a rambling 1 1/2-story wood-frame structure, with a Cape style main block, a tall ell to the east, and a long single-story ell running north from the north west corner of the main block. The original portion of the house dates to the early 19th century, but has a later 19th-century turret-like projection built above its front door. The west-facing side door is sheltered by an elaborately carved hood, exhibiting floral motifs and intricate carvings of animals.

The farm was purchased in 1931 by Henry Beston and Elizabeth Coatsworth, who had married in 1929. Coatsworth was noted for her children's books, winning the Newbery Medal in 1931 for The Cat Who Went to Heaven, and Beston was also known as a writer of children's books. His most famous book, The Outermost House, was a work of nature writing said to have had a major influence on Rachel Carson. Aspects of Chimney Farm are discernible in the writings of both authors.

Poet Gary Lawless and his wife, Beth Leonard, inherited the property after the death of Leonard's mother.

== See also ==
- National Register of Historic Places listings in Lincoln County, Maine
