= Cooks Brook =

Cooks Brook may refer to:

in Canada

- Cooks Brook, Nova Scotia
- Cooks Brook (Newfoundland), a stream

in the United States

- Cooks Brook, of Cooks Brook Beach, Barnstable County, Massachusetts
