= Eastham Airport =

- IATA: none; ICAO: none

Summary
- Operator: Private
- Location: Eastham, Massachusetts
- Built: Unknown
- In use: Around 1946
- Occupants: Private
- Elevation AMSL: 35 ft / 11 m
- Coordinates: 41°51′3.15″N 69°59′36.04″W

Map
- Eastham Airport (Massachusetts) Eastham Airport (the United States)

Eastham Airport was an airfield operational in the mid-20th century. The airfield was described as being located in a small field off Herring Brook Road in Eastham, Massachusetts.
