= Governor Clay (disambiguation) =

Governor Clay is an American songwriter and performer. Governor Clay may also refer to:

- Clement Comer Clay (1789–1866), governor of Alabama
- Lucius D. Clay (1898–1978), military governor of the United States Zone in Germany following World War II
