= Jake Day =

American artist, creator of Bambi

Maurice "Jake" Day
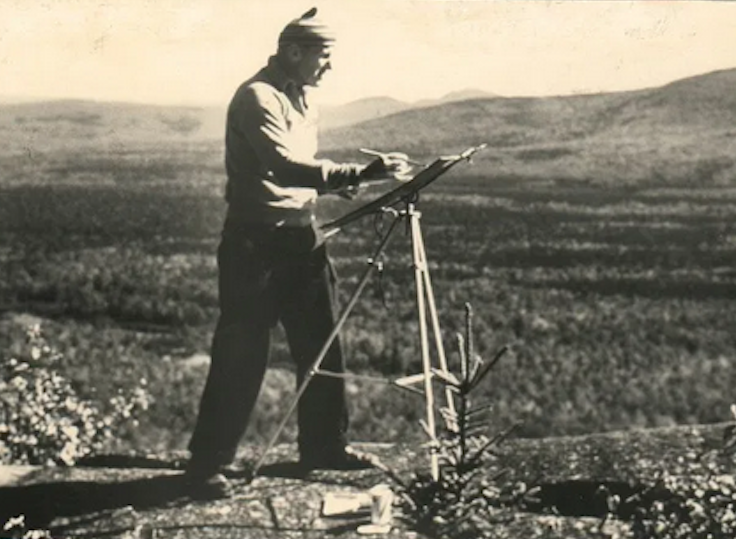
- Maurice "Jake" Day painting in Katahdin
- Born: Maurice Ellicott Day; July 2, 1892; Damariscotta, Maine
- Died: May 17, 1983 (aged 90); Damariscotta, Maine
- Resting place: Hillside-Norris Cemetery, Damariscotta, ME
- Notable work: Bambi
- Spouse: Beatrice Darling Day; Martha Beane Larson Day
- Website: www.mauricejakeday.com

Maurice "Jake" Day (July 2, 1892 – May 17, 1983) was an American artist, sculptor, photographer, naturalist and illustrator. He is best known for creating the fawn-like character of Bambi for the 1942 animated Walt Disney feature film Bambi.

== Early life ==
Maurice Ellicott Day was born in Damariscotta, Maine in the Day family homestead that his great-grandfather built in 1892. His ancestors were shipbuilders from the 17th century. He attended school at Lincoln Academy in Newcastle, Maine, studied art and painting at the Massachusetts College of Art and graduated from the Museum of Fine Arts in Boston in 1915. He was known to his family and friends as "Jake"; but no one knows how or when he received the nickname.

After serving in World War I, Day returned to his hometown; continuing to work as an artist. An avid outdoors man, he hiked the Katahdin region of Northern Maine long before it had trails. His adventures were featured in many outdoor sporting stories by Edmund Ware Smith; which Day also illustrated. In addition, Day illustrated works for other authors such as naturalist Henry Beston and Elizabeth Coatsworth; and for publications such as the Vanity Fair, Life, Atlantic Monthly, House Beautiful, and Outdoor Life. Known for his humor, Day created witty editorial cartoons for the Portland Press Herald, Lewiston Sun Journal, and Waterville Sentinel.

== Career as animator ==
Day worked at various animation studios including MGM, Harman and Ising, and Hanna Barbera before joining the Walt Disney Studios in California in 1936. He served as an illustrator and layout artist for films such as Merbabies. But it wasn't until Disney obtained the rights to the 1923 book Bambi, a Life in the Woods by Felix Salten that Day established his name with the studio, becoming known as "one of the first and best-known animators at Disney Studios."

=== Bambi production ===
Bambi, the main character of the book, was a roe deer, a species native to Europe. But Walt Disney intended to base the character for the film adaptation on a mule deer from Arrowhead, California. However, Day argued that mule deer had large "mule-like" ears and were mostly indigenous to western North America, while the white-tail deer was more commonly recognized throughout America.

Unpersuaded, Disney reportedly said, "Prove it," and sent Day to Maine with a list of scenic images specific to the landscape to photograph: hazelnuts, marsh grass, oak leaves, pine cones, birch bark, low-bush and high-bush blueberries, red maple, and speckled alder trees. In response, Day took thousands of pictures of "trees glittering with ice, snowy beaver dams, and trees charred by fire. He photographed not only details of the forest floor: the lichen, leaves, ferns, pools, rotting logs, pitcher plants, autumn leaves; but even a bear cub’s footprints in the mud" and fire burnt trees. At night, Day and his traveling companion Lester Hall studied the shooting script to see where they should venture the next day to capture just the right image to accompany such scenes as Bambi's first walk, mouse encounters, and Thumper's environment. Day ultimately swayed Disney, who gave the green light for Bambi to be a white-tail deer.

"We had to remember," Day said, "that Disney has a ruthless fidelity to the physical scene, to the truth of nature, even when he may seem to the distorting nature. When corn gets into a picture, then make no mistake about it, corn must be an actor. And so up there in the Katahdin wild, when I took a shot – well, if it was only a short of a burnt tree, or some great webby root grasping at rockly soil, or a lichen like a colored shell wedged into a rough bark – I had to consider that Disney might say to me, 'What does that say to you? What do you feel? What does it do to you? Put it down on paper!'"

Since Disney animators had never seen a live white-tail deer, Day arranged with the Maine Department of Economic Development to have two four-month-old orphaned fawns brought from the state to be sketched by the studio artists. When the two fawns were delivered to the area Railway Express office, the sign on the truck read: "Walt Disney's new 'Find From Maine', Bambi, enroute (sic) to Hollywood to act as model for the 'hero' in Disney's next full length picture, "Bambi'. He is travelling (sic) with his girl friend, Faline – from Maine to California by Railway express." For nine months, animators drew the fawns as they aged into adulthood and lost their spots. The fawns were fed milk formula, lime juice, and Maine spring water. The two deer lived at the Disney studios during the five years it took to complete the film. Shortly after, the model for Bambi died and the model for Faline was transported to Griffith Park Zoo in Los Angeles, where she became a mother.

Disney tried to hold the film's premiere in Augusta, Maine to recognize Day's considerable contributions, but officials voted against premiering the film in the state, fearing protests from the local hunting community. Instead, Bambi premiered in London on August 8, 1942, and then at Radio City Music Hall in New York City before its first "public showing" in Portland, Maine.

== Later life ==
While working on the film Bambi, Day grew homesick for his native state of Maine. He moved back home with his family in 1940. Always connected with the outdoors, Day traveled extensively throughout the state of Maine. Hiking and exploring various parks along with his band of fellow sportsmen called "Jake's Rangers", Day was affectionately called "Colonel Jake".

In the mid-1940s, Day began to experiment in creating dioramas; entering a local holiday decoration competition. With his first entry, an Eskimo village, a Day household Christmas tradition began that spanned 70 years. Displayed in the front window of the Day home on Bristol road in Damariscotta, some measuring six feet in length, both adults and children throughout the town gathered annually to view the dioramas. Following his death in 1983, the collection of dioramas were given to the Farnsworth Art Museum in Rockland, Maine. Over the years, several units suffered damage due to being exposed to the elements; but relatives restored many of them to their original state.

At age 78, Day climbed Mount Katahdin with then governor Ken Curtis. He planned to climb again on his 80th birthday in 1973, except there were "too many black flies." Maurice "Jake" Day died at the age of 90 on May 17, 1983. He was survived by his second wife, Martha Beane Larson Day and three children.

== Legacy ==
In 1967, Governor Percival P. Baxter appointed him "artist in residence" of Baxter State Park; for which Day designed the park's seal and illustrated the park's map. The University of Maine and Unity College awarded Day honorary degrees; and three Maine Governors selected him for membership with the Maine Arts Commission.

Maurice Day married Beatrice Darling Day, his first wife, and had two sons: Richard Beston Day and Dr. McClure "Mac" Day. Day's son "Mac" continued his father's legacy by spending time with outdoor sporting friends known as "Jake's Rangers"; a group originally made famous in articles by Edmond Ware Smith in the magazine Field and Stream.

== Filmography ==
Year	Film title	Role	Studio
1938	The Merbabies	Layout Artist	Disney
1940	The Milky Way	Illustrator	MGM
1942	Bambi	Illustrator / Researcher	Disney

== Bibliography ==
- Bergengren, Ralph (1918). Jane, Joseph & John : Their Book Of Verses. PALALA Press. ISBN 978-1356027828.
- Livingston, Robert (1920). The Land Of The Great Out-Of-Doors.
- Cowles Le Cron, Helen (1926). The Animal Etiquette Book of Rhymes. Courier Corporation. ISBN 978-0486782348.
- Dorothea Cordts, Anna (1929). The New Path To Reading.
- Dresbach, Elsa (1951). Beasties.
- Ware Smith, Edmund (1956). New England's Last Wilderness: The Valley Of The Wassataquoick.
- Storrs Lee, W. (1968). Maine : A Literary Chronicle Edited, With Commentaries.
