= Eastham Windmill =

Coordinates: 41.83048°N 69.97475°W

- U.S. Historic district – Contributing property
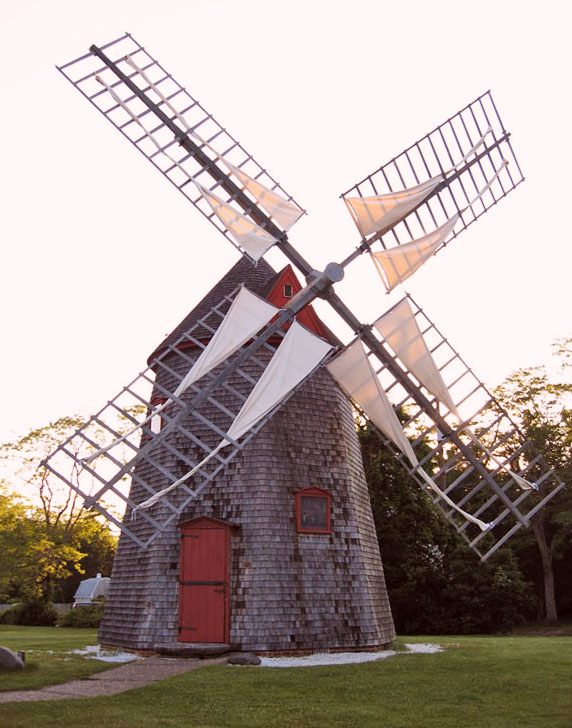
- Eastham Windmill, built in 1680

- Location within Cape Cod Location within Massachusetts Location within the United States
- Location: Eastham, Massachusetts
- Architect: Cummings, Charles K.; et al.
- Architectural style: Georgian, Late Victorian
- Part of: Eastham Center Historic District (ID99000560)
- Designated CP: May 12, 1999

The Eastham Windmill, located in Eastham, Massachusetts, is the oldest windmill on Cape Cod. It was constructed by Eastham resident Thomas Paine in Plymouth in 1680. It was first moved to nearby Truro in 1770, then finally to Eastham in 1793. In 1808 the windmill was moved to its present location, near the Eastham Town Hall and the Eastham Public Library. Eastham Windmill, as part of the Eastham Center Historic District, was added to the National Register of Historic Places in 1999.

A local festival, Eastham Windmill Weekend, has been held on a yearly basis in Eastham since 1977, and takes place the first weekend after Labor Day.

While repairs are necessary over time, a large contribution was made in 1996 by a local Boy Scout whose Eagle Project included both raising the funds and providing the labor to replace several sections of the fencing around this historic landmark. All of the funding was provided by businesses located within Eastham. The Eastham Windmill has been a long-standing icon to the local Boy Scouts and Cub Scouts.
