= Skiff Hill =

- Location within Massachusetts Location within the United States

Highest point
- Elevation: 46 ft (14 m)
- Coordinates: 41°49′19″N 69°57′48″W

Geography
- Location: Cape Cod, Massachusetts
- Topo map: USGS Orleans

Skiff Hill is a hill in Barnstable County, Massachusetts. It is located northeast of Orleans in the Town of Eastham. Fort Hill is located south of Skiff Hill.
