= Louise Seaman Bechtel =

American writer

- Born: Louise Seaman; June 29, 1894; Brooklyn, New York
- Died: April 12, 1985 (aged 90); Mount Kisco, New York
- Education: Vassar College
- Occupations: Editor, critic, author, teacher
- Spouse: Edwin DeTurck Bechtel

Louise Seaman Bechtel (June 29, 1894 – April 12, 1985) was an American editor, critic, author, and teacher of young children. She was the first person to head a juvenile book department established by an American publishing house.

== Biography ==
=== Early life ===
Louise Seaman was born in 1894 to Charles F. Seaman. She attended and graduated from Vassar College in 1915. Bechtel married to Edwin DeTurck Bechtel, an attorney, art collector, and authority about and scholar of rose culture in March 1929.

=== Career ===
In 1919, she became the editor of the Macmillan Publishers' new juvenile department, and the first person to head a juvenile book department established by an American publishing house. Macmillan's president, George P. Brett, later wrote about the founding of the department: “It had occurred to me [that children's] books would benefit more than any others, perhaps, from separate editorial supervision.” Brett believed that women knew more about children and would therefore make a better department head. Even with the freedom to develop the new department, Brett still expected Seaman to develop her own advertising copy. She inherited Macmillan's standard children's titles including Alice's Adventures in Wonderland, Charles Kingsley's Water Babies, and Mary Louisa Molesworth's The Cuckoo Clock. During her fifteen-year tenure as managing editor at the Macmillan Company, she expanded Macmillan's children's titles to more than 600 new books, a milestone in the growth and development of American literature for children.

During the Great Depression, Bechtel was able to continue publishing novels through the reputation of the publishing house. However, by 1932, she was forced to dismiss her assistant, Eunice P. Blake, and Macmillan had a new president with George Platt Brett, Jr. The new president cut Bechtel's budget and understated the financial role her department had on the company. Bechtel resigned from Macmillan Company in 1934 due to a broken hip from a horseback riding accident injury sustained in 1933 and internal pressures. Between 1949 and 1956, she was editor of the "Books for Young People" section of the New York Herald Tribune.

Three of the books she published, The Trumpeter of Krakow by Eric P. Kelly in 1929, Hitty, Her First Hundred Years by Rachel Field in 1930, and The Cat Who Went to Heaven by Elizabeth Coatsworth in 1931, were awarded the Newbery Medal. As an author, Bechtel's best-known books are The Brave Bantam in 1946, and Mr. Peck's Pets in 1947.

During her long career, Bechtel acquired an incomparable collection of children's books. Later donated to Vassar College and the University of Florida in Gainesville, it exceeded 3,500 volumes, among them rare folk tales, Asian and African legends, Greek mythology, Aesop's fables, tales from Shakespeare, and early twentieth century children's book illustrators such as Arthur Rackham, Kate Greenaway, and Boris Artzybasheff.

=== Death ===
Louise Seaman Bechtel died on April 12, 1985, in Mount Kisco, New York, and is buried at Saint Matthew's Episcopal Churchyard in Bedford, New York.

== The Bechtel Prize ==
The Bechtel Prize, named for her, is endowed by the Cerimon Fund and administered by Teachers & Writers Collaborative in New York. The Prize is awarded annually in recognition of an exemplary article or essay related to creative writing education, literary studies, and/or the profession of writing.

The winning essay appears in Teachers & Writers magazine, and the author receives a $1,000 honorarium. Possible topics for Bechtel Prize submissions include contemporary issues in classroom teaching, innovative approaches to teaching literary forms and genres, and the intersection between literature and imaginative writing.

=== Bechtel Prize winners and finalists ===
Note: winner in bold.

- **2004**
  - **Mary Cappello** for "Can Creative Writing Be Taught?"
  - **Sam Swope** for "The Tree Project"
- **2005**
  - **Diane LeBlanc** for "Weaving Voices: Writing as a Working Class Daughter, Professor, and Poet"
- **2006**
  - **Sarah Porter** for “'The Pen Has Become the Character’: How Creative Writing Creates Us”
  - Sarah Dohrmann for “Teenage Boy Gunned Down”
  - Douglas Goetsch for “A Poetry Stand”
  - Louise Hawes for “Thou Shalt Not Tell... or Shalt Thou? A Reconsideration of the First Commandment for Writers”
  - Chris Malcomb for “Broken Lines”
- **2007**
  - **Anna Sopko** for “Writing Standards: Finding One's Way with Words”
  - Sarah J. Gardner for “Three Writers, Imagination, and Meaning”
  - Jeff Kass for “In Search of a True Word”
  - Cheryl Pallant for “Gifting Poems: Getting Students to Read Poetry Closely”
  - Barbara Roether for “Pride and Prejudice on the Barbary Coast”
- **2008**
  - **Michael Bazzett** for “Within Words: Making Students At Home in the Language of Literature”
  - Cathlin Goulding for “When Twilight Falls: How Documentary Poetry Responds to Social Injustice”
  - David Herring for “A Classroom for Old Men: Aging Among Poems and Teenagers”
- **2009**
  - **Emily Raboteau** for “A Slip Into the Breaks: Teaching Jazz Poetry”
  - Marcia Chamberlain for “When You Listen Deeply”
  - Garth Greenwell for “Reading with the Voice”
- **2010** (judged by Phillip Lopate)
  - **Garth Greenwell** for “A Native Music: Writing the City in Sofia, Bulgaria”
  - Wilson Diehl for “Getting Creative with the Truth”
  - Barbara Feinberg for “Your First Lime”
- **2011** (judged by Patricia Hampl)
  - **Janet L. Bland** for "The Possum"
  - Julia Shipley for "Writing from the Ox House"
  - Jane Elkington Wohl for "On Teaching Othello Again"
- **2012** (judged by Jo Ann Beard)
  - **Barbara Flug Colin** for "Now Let’s Stare at the Purple"
- **2013** (judged by Susan Orlean)
  - **Chris Belden** for “Inside Words: How to Teach Writing in Prison"
  - Eileen Shields for "The Literature of Lockdown"
- **2016**
  - **Christian McEwan** for "Alastair Reid: Traveling Light"
  - Evelyn Krieger for "Liar, Liar"
- **2017** (judged by Garth Greenwell)
  - **M.K. Rainey** for “I Hate Writing: On the Necessity of Being Vulnerable"
  - Eileen Sutton for "Dear Dr. Doctorow"
- **2018**
  - **Julie Landsman**, "Words, Images and Music: How We Enter"
- **2019**
  - **Emily James**, "At First the Ground Shakes"
- **2020**
  - **Amy Young**, "Jibseria: A Garden Mythology"
- **2021**
  - **Paola Capó-García**, "Making Sense of It All: Highschool Poetry in the Age of Zoom"
- **2022**
  - **Shilpi Suneja**, "Multilingual Approaches Toward English Prose"
- **2023**
  - **William Camponovo**, "You Must Change Your Life: Demystifying and Remystifying Poetry in the Classroom"

== The Louise Seaman Bechtel Fellowship at the Baldwin Library ==
The Bechtel Fellowship, awarded by the Association of Library Service to Children (ALSC), a division of the American Library Association, awards a mid-career librarian, with a minimum of eight years experience working with children, $4,000 to spend a month reading and studying at the Baldwin library at the University of Florida in Gainesville, Florida.

== Bibliography (partial) ==
=== Books written ===
- The Brave Bantam. 1946
- Mr. Peck's Pets. 1947
- The boy with the star lantern: Edwin De Turck Bechtel, 1880-1957: a memoir. published privately, 1960
- About Bedford Corners and Our Home in One Corner. Luneburg, Vt., Stinehour Press, 1963

=== Books edited ===
- The Trumpeter of Krakow. Eric P. Kelly, 1929
- Hitty, Her First Hundred Years. Rachel Field, 1930
- The Cat Who Went to Heaven. Elizabeth Coatsworth, 1931
