= Old Town Center Historic District =

Historic district in Massachusetts, United States

- U.S. National Register of Historic Places
- U.S. Historic district
- Location within Cape Cod Location within Massachusetts Location within the United States
- Location: Eastham, Massachusetts
- Coordinates: 41°50′18″N 69°58′37″W
- Area: 40 acres (16 ha)
- Architect: Ward, George; Bangs, Seymour and John, et al.
- Architectural style: Colonial, Georgian
- NRHP reference No.: 01000196
- Added to NRHP: March 2, 2001

The Old Town Center Historic District is a historic district roughly along Locust Public Rd. and Salt Pond Road in Eastham, Massachusetts. The district encompasses Eastham's original town center, with a cluster of well-preserved 18th- and 19th-century buildings. The area served as the town's civic center due to its proximity to Salt Pond, which provided access to the Atlantic Ocean, and was a major transportation route. (Most of the district is now separated from Salt Pond by US Route 6, a four-lane road.) The advent of the railroad in the 1870s shifted the town's economic and civic heart to the present center. The Old Town district is 40 acres (16 ha) in size, with 42 mainly residential buildings contributing to its significance. The oldest building in the district is the c. 1672 John Knowles House at 191 Locust Road. The town's first town hall (1851) and first schoolhouse (1869) still stand in the district; the schoolhouse is a landmark visible from Route 6.

The district was listed on the National Register of Historic Places in 2001.

== See also ==
- National Register of Historic Places listings in Barnstable County, Massachusetts
