= Northern Farm =

Northern Farm may refer to:

- Northern Farm (stud), a major Japanese horse breeding stud
- Northern Farm (book), a 1948 book by naturalist/writer Henry Beston
