= Teachers & Writers Collaborative =

New York City-based organization

- Formation: 1967; 59 years ago
- Founders: Herbert Kohl, June Jordan, Muriel Rukeyser, Grace Paley, Anne Sexton
- Type: 501(c)(3) non-profit
- Purpose: Education
- Region served: New York City and surrounding region
- Executive Director: Asari Beale
- Website: www.twc.org

Teachers & Writers Collaborative is a New York City-based organization that sends writers and other artists into schools. It was founded in 1967 by a group of writers and educators, including Herbert Kohl (the group's founding director), June Jordan, Muriel Rukeyser, Grace Paley, and Anne Sexton, who believed that writers could make a unique contribution to the teaching of writing. Teachers & Writers was initially funded by a grant from the United States Office of Education.

A non-profit organization, T&W has brought writing residencies and professional development workshops to more than 760,000 students and 26,000 teachers in the New York tri-state region; at a current rate of 10,000 students per year. Over the years, they have published over 80 books on the practice of teaching creative writing. Their quarterly magazine was published continually from 1967 to 2014. T&W also sponsors an educational radio show, free after-school programs, and literacy initiatives.

== History ==
The formation of Teachers & Writers Collaborative came out of the foment of the 1960s, and the founding writers' dissatisfaction with the rote methods of public school pedagogy. The spark for the organization came out of a series of lectures at Tufts University hosted by M.I.T. professor Jerrold R. Zacharias, an education reformer with ties to President Lyndon B. Johnson. Teachers & Writers was formed with funds from the White House's Office of Science and Technology.

T&W's first project was at Manhattan's P.S. 75, with workshops coordinated by Phillip Lopate. The project model led to similar Artists-in-the-Schools programs in all 50 states. Despite this success, T&W's programs led to pushback from public school faculty and administrators – it wasn't until 1971, through dedicated collaboration with their hosts, that Teachers & Writers became stable and accepted. In addition to Lopate and its founders, T&W's program and philosophy were shaped by writers like Rosellen Brown, Victor Hernández Cruz, Kenneth Koch, and Robert B. Silvers.

In 1979, Nancy Larson Shapiro became T&W's executive director, taking over from Steven Schrader, who had served in the position since 1969.

In the early 1980s T&W moved its headquarters from 186 West 4th Street to 5 Union Square West, and in 1985 the organization opened the "Center for Imaginative Writing", a resource library and meeting space for teachers, students, writers, and the general public. Poet Ron Padgett was editor of Teachers & Writers Magazine from 1980 to 2000; Padgett was the organization's director of publications from around 1982 to 1999.

In 2004, T&W began administering the annual Bechtel Prize, endowed by the Cerimon Fund in honor of Louise Seaman Bechtel. The winning essay appears in Teachers & Writers Magazine (now in online form), and the author receives a $1,000 honorarium. Possible topics for Bechtel Prize submissions include contemporary issues in classroom teaching, innovative approaches to teaching literary forms and genres, and the intersection between literature and imaginative writing.

In 2005, T&W hired Amy Swauger as executive director, taking over from Nancy Larson Shapiro, who had served in the position for 26 years. That same year, T&W was among 406 New York City arts and social service institutions to receive part of a $20 million grant from the Carnegie Corporation, which was made possible through a donation by New York City mayor Michael Bloomberg.

T&W moved to Manhattan's Garment District in 2006, opening a new Center for Imaginative Writing which hosted readings, book parties, and workshops. T&W moved to Brooklyn in 2019.

Other writers who have been a part of T&W over the years include Lennox Raphael, Jesús Papoleto Meléndez, Sam Swope, Matthew Sharpe, Susan Mernit, Meredith Sue Willis, and Bill Zavatsky.

Asari Beale became the organization's executive director in 2019.

== Board of directors ==
As of 2020, T&W's board of directors included Patricia Hampl, Steven Schrader, and Tiphanie Yanique. Past board members have included Herbert Kohl, Phillip Lopate, Walter Dean Myers, Ron Padgett, Emily Raboteau, and Robert B. Silvers.
