= Meredith Sue Willis =

American novelist

- Born: 1946 (age 79–80); Clarksburg, West Virginia
- Occupation: Writer

Meredith Sue Willis (born 1946 in Clarksburg, West Virginia), is a writer of short stories, novels for adults and for children, as well as non-fiction on the subject of creative writing.

== Early life ==
Willis graduated from Barnard College in 1969 and received an MFA from the Columbia University School of the Arts in 1972.

== Biography ==
A well-known speaker and writer about the teaching of writing, her own novels include A Space Apart, Higher Ground, Only Great Changes, Trespassers, Oradell at Sea, and Their Houses. Her short story collections include In the Mountains of America, Dwight's House and Other Stories, and Out of the Mountains. Her work has been praised in periodicals like The New York Times Book Review, The Nation, and The San Francisco Chronicle.

She has won major awards including literary fellowships from the National Endowment for the Arts and the New Jersey State Council on the Arts, and her fiction has won prizes like the PEN Syndicated Fiction Award and the West Virginia Library Association Award (1980), as well as the Chaffin Award for fiction.

An early writer-in-the-schools with Teachers and Writers Collaborative, she has turned many of her experiences teaching writing into three books for teachers and writers (Personal Fiction Writing, Deep Revision, and Blazing Pencils) and three novels for children (The Secret Super Powers of Marco, Marco's Monster, and Billie of Fish House Lane). She also wrote the highly praised how-to-write book Ten Strategies to Write Your Novel.

She is a past Distinguished Teaching Artist of the New Jersey State Council on the Arts.

== Works ==
=== Novels for adults ===
- A Space Apart (1979, 2005, 2013)
- Higher Ground (1981, 1998)
- Only Great Changes (1985, 1998)
- Trespassers (1997)
- Oradell at Sea (2002)
- The City Built of Starships (2005)
- Love Palace (2014)
- Oradell at Sea (2014)
- Their Houses (2018)

=== Collections of short stories ===
- In the Mountains of America (1994)
- Dwight's House and Other Stories (2004)
- Out of the Mountains (2010)
- Re-Visions: Stories from Stories (2011)

=== Novels for children and young adults ===
- The Secret Super Powers of Marco (1994, 1995, 2001)
- Marco's Monster (1996, 2001)
- Billie of Fish House Lane (2006)
- Meli's Way (2015)

=== Nonfiction about writing ===
- Personal Fiction Writing: A Guide to Writing from Real Life for Teachers, Students, and Writers (1984, 2000)
- Blazing Pencils: A Guide to Writing Fiction and Essays (1990, 2000)
- Deep Revision: A Guide for Teachers, Students, and Other Writers (1993)
- Ten Strategies to Write Your Novel (2010)
