= James Koller =

American poet

- Born: James Anthony Koller Jr. May 30, 1936 (age 90); Oak Park, Illinois
- Died: December 10, 2014; Joplin, Missouri
- Occupations: Poet, novelist
- Writing career
- Period: 1954–present
- Notable works: California Poems, 1971; Poems For The Blue Sky, 1976; The Bone Show, 1999; Like It Was, 2000; Snows Gone By, 2004
- Literary movement: Beat Generation, postmodernism

James Koller (May 30, 1936 – December 10, 2014) was an American poet. He spent his early life in northern Illinois, and the 1960s on the Pacific Coast. In the early-1970s he moved to Maine, where he lived until his death while traveling across the US. Koller is the author of more than thirty books of poetry. He has also published three novels and numerous essays. His writing has been translated into Italian, French, Spanish, German and Swedish. He began performing his work in the US in 1959, and starting in the late-1970s appeared widely in western Europe, often accompanied by others, notably the late Swiss poet and artist Franco Beltrametti, the German poet Stefan Hyner and the folk musician Governor Clay. He was publisher of Coyote Books and Coyote's Journal since 1964. Many of his Beat, Black Mountain and San Francisco contemporaries (Ed Dorn, Charles Olson, Gary Snyder, Joanne Kyger, Allen Ginsberg) have appeared in these publications.

Koller was also active in the bio-regional and ecological movements.

== Life and career ==
The son of an engraver, Koller began his involvement in the arts in the 1950s with vocational training in photography. In 1964, while living in Washington state, he became poetry editor of the Northwest Review (the University of Oregon's literary magazine) at Philip Whalen's suggestion, only to see the magazine suspended after publishing an issue featuring Fidel Castro and Antonin Artaud. Soon after, with fellow editors Ed Van Aelstyn and Will Wroth, he founded [ Coyote's Journal.

Koller's first book, Two Hands, was published in 1965 in Seattle, by James B. Smith. He moved to northern California in that year. His poetry appeared in reviews (The Floating Bear, Locus Solus, The Paris Review, The Rivoli Review), and additional books followed: from Toad Press (Eugene, Oregon), Four Seasons (San Francisco), and Black Sparrow (Los Angeles).

Koller remained in the Bay Area into the 1970s, and at times joined the Diggers in putting out their Haight-Ashbury free broadsides.

After his time in California, Koller lived for a while in Santa Fe, New Mexico, but mostly stayed on the move. After settling in Lewiston, Maine, he began working at Bookland, a bookstore, alongside Gary Lawless, a fellow poet.

In 1976 Koller was invited to England to read his work at the Cambridge Poetry Festival alongside Robert Creeley, Robert Duncan, Seamus Heaney, Jean Daive and Jacques Roubaud. Afterward, he embarked on the first of many European tours, accompanied by the late Franco Beltrametti and Harry Hoogstraten. He and Beltrametti made their first poetry tour in the US in 1977. From then on he criss-crossed both Europe and America, giving readings. From 1987 to 1989, he performed Graffiti Lyriques with Beltrametti from Bologna to Stockholm. Since the 1989 Chicago performance of The Bone Show with composer Peter Garland, Koller has regularly appeared and been recorded in the US and Europe with American musician/songwriter Governor Clay. In 2003 he toured the US with German poet Stefan Hyner. In 2005 he performed The Bone Show with Silvana Mariniello in Rome.

While editor of Coyote's Journal and Coyote Books since 1964, Koller also edited the book review Otherwise from 1994 to 1997. He taught a course on the Icelandic sagas with Stefan Hyner and Reidar Ekner in Bø i Telemark, Norway, 2001. He was also active as an artist and photographer (exhibitions in Portland, Maine; Santa Fe, New Mexico; New York City and Rome, Italy).

== Bibliography ==
=== Poetry ===
- A River I Couldn't Find (2015)
- Snows Gone By (2004)
- Ashes & Embers / Ceneri e Brace (English with Italian translation by Anna Ruchat, 2004)
- Looking For His Horses (2003)
- Crows Talk To Him (2003)
- Un Reading di Poesie, with Gary Snyder (English with uncredited Italian translations, 2002)
- Close To The Ground / Vicino Alle Origini (English with Italian translation by Eva Fuso, 2000)
- Iron Bells / Cloches de Fer (English with French translation by Jean Monod, 1999)
- The Bone Show (English with Italian translation by Etain Addey, Maurizio Castelluci and Giuseppe Moretti, 1999)
- Travaux de Voirie, selected poems in English from "Road Work" (1997)
- This Is What He Said, poems and graphics (1991)
- Roses Love Sunshine (1989)
- A Gang Of Four, poems and artwork by Franco Beltrametti, Julien Blaine, James Koller and Tom Raworth (1989)
- Graffiti Lyriques, poems and artwork by Franco Beltrametti and James Koller (1987)
- Fortune (English with Italian translations by Franco Beltrametti, 1987)
- Openings (1987)
- Give The Dog A Bone (1986)
- Great Things Are Happening / Grossartige Dinge Passieren (English with German translation by Stefan Hyner, 1984)
- One Day At A Time (1981)
- Back River (1981)
- O Didn't He Ramble / O Ware Er Nicht Umhergezogen (English with German translation by Stefan Hyner, 1981)
- Andiamo, poems by Franco Beltrametti, Harry Hoogstraten and James Koller (1978)
- Messages / Botschaften (German translation by Michael Kohler, 1977)
- Poems For The Blue Sky: Selected Poems 1959-72 (1976)
- Bureau Creek (1975)
- California Poems (1971)
- I Went To See My True Love (1967)
- The Dogs & Other Dark Woods (1966)
- Some Cows, Poems Of Civilization & Domestic Life (1966)
- Brainard & Washington Street Poems (1965)
- Two Hands, Poems 1959-61 (1965)
- My Paw, Poem

=== Fiction ===
- The Possible Movie, with Franco Beltrametti (1997)
- Shannon, Who Was Lost Before (1975)
- If You Don't Like Me You Can Leave Me Alone (1974)

=== Other works ===
- Like It Was, selected writings from and about the 60's (2000)
- The Natural Order, essay and graphics (1990)
- Working Notes 1960-82 (1985)

=== Anthologies ===
- New Writing in the USA (1967)
- The Postmoderns (1982)
