= 36 Children =

Book by Herbert Kohl

- First edition
- Author: Herbert Kohl
- Illustrator: Robert George Jackson, III
- Subject: education
- Published: 1967 New American Library
- Media type: cloth, paperback
- Pages: 224
- ISBN: 978-0452264632
- Dewey Decimal: 372.9/7471
- LC Class: LC2803.H3 K6

36 Children is the 1967 memoir of Herbert Kohl's service as a young teacher working in an impoverished New York public school. The book includes a chapter titled "Journey through Space and Time", written and illustrated by Robert George Jackson III, one of his students, age eleven. Other material written and illustrated by Jackson and other students is included in the book. First published in 1967 by the New American Library, it was republished in September 1988 by the Penguin Group. Reviewer Peter Schrag commented that the work contains "tough but (usually) sympathetic kids, callous administrators, and a collection of fearful school types spouting hate through their pieties and educational nonsense through their apathy" while "the writer-protagonist is part anthropologist fascinated by the ghetto, part muckraking journalist, and part teacher struggling manfully to work with the children placed in his care."
