= Eastham Center Historic District =

Historic district in Massachusetts, United States

- U.S. National Register of Historic Places
- U.S. Historic district
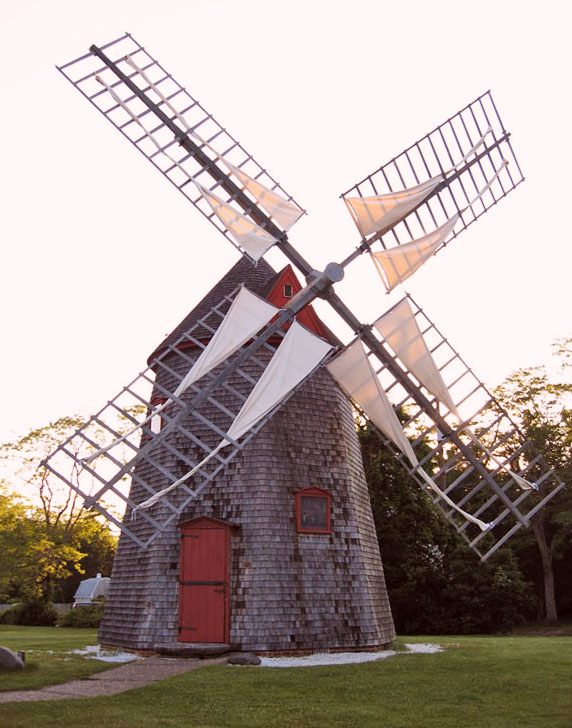
- Eastham Windmill, built in 1680

- Location within Cape Cod Location within Massachusetts Location within the United States
- Location: Eastham, Massachusetts
- Coordinates: 41°49′40″N 69°58′24″W
- Area: 31 acres (13 ha)
- Architect: Cummings, Charles K.; et al.
- Architectural style: Georgian, Late Victorian
- NRHP reference No.: 99000560
- Added to NRHP: May 12, 1999

The Eastham Center Historic District is a historic district encompassing the main village center of Eastham, Massachusetts. This village center grew around the railroad station, which was built in 1870. The arrival of the railroad resulted in a shift of economic and civic activity from the old town center, a short way to the north. Prominent buildings in the district include the Town Hall (2500 State Highway), a Colonial Revival structure built in 1912, the Library (190 Samoses Road), built in 1897, and the Universalist Chapel (220 Samoset Road), built 1889. The main focal point of the district is Windmill Park, location of the Eastham Windmill, built c. 1680 and moved to Eastham in the 1790s; it is the oldest windmill on Cape Cod. The district was added to the National Register of Historic Places in 1999.

== See also ==
- National Register of Historic Places listings in Barnstable County, Massachusetts
