= Atari Games & Recreations =

1982 book by Herb Kohl

- Author: Herb Kohl
- Genre: Game Design
- Publisher: Reston Publishing
- Publication date: 1982

Atari Games & Recreations is a book written by Herb Kohl and published by Reston Publishing in 1982.

== Contents ==
Atari Games & Recreations is a book about game design for programmers working on the Atari 400 and Atari 800 systems.

== Reception ==
Michael Cranford reviewed the book for Computer Gaming World, and stated that "I had hoped for more information and a deeper more intricate, look at the gaming functions of the Atari microcomputer. In any case, the book is very well done and should prove to be a great asset to the beginner. For those with a more advanced programming background, skim through this one before you buy it."

== Reviews ==
- The Reader's Guide To Microcomputer Books
- ANALOG Computing
- Popular Computing
- Software Merchandising
