= Herbert R. Kohl =

American educator (born 1937)

- Born: Herbert Ralph Kohl; August 22, 1937 (age 89); Bronx, New York, New York, US
- Education: Harvard College, AB, 1958; Teachers College, Columbia University, MA, 1962
- Occupations: Educator, writer
- Known for: Advocacy of alternative education
- Spouse: Judith Kohl

Herbert Ralph Kohl (born August 22, 1937) is an American educator best known for his advocacy of progressive alternative education and as the author of more than thirty books on education. He founded the 1960s Open School movement and is credited with coining the term "open classroom".

== Early life ==
Born into a Jewish household, Kohl attended the Bronx High School of Science and studied philosophy and mathematics at Harvard University from 1954 to 1958. At Harvard he was president of the Signet Society and was elected to Phi Beta Kappa, graduating with an AB degree in 1958. During the 1958–59 academic year he attended University College, Oxford on a Henry Fellowship, and in 1959–1960 he studied philosophy at Columbia University with a Woodrow Wilson Fellowship.

Deciding against an academic career, Kohl entered Teachers College, Columbia University, in 1961 and, in 1962, received an MA in teaching, while qualifying for a permanent K-8 teaching certificate in New York City public schools. In 1962 Kohl became a sixth-grade teacher in the New York City public schools, something he had dreamed of doing since childhood.

== Early career ==
Kohl has been teaching and writing for over 45 years. During that time, he has taught every grade from kindergarten through graduate school but not in that order.

His career as a teacher began in 1962 in Harlem, where he continued to work for six years. From September 1964 to June 1967, under a grant from the National Institute of Education, he ran a storefront school for junior high and high school students, taught high school psychology and writing, and worked as curriculum coordinator for the Parent Board of the I.S. 201 Community School District.

In 1967, he became the founding director of the Teachers & Writers Collaborative, a project intended to transform the teaching of writing in the schools. He is still a board member of the Collaborative.

In 1964, Kohl's first book, The Age of Complexity, about analytic and existential philosophy, was published at the same time that he was teaching sixth grade. His first writings on education, Teaching the Unteachable (New York Review of Books, New York, 1967) and The Language and Education of the Deaf (The Urban Review Press, New York, 1967), set the themes for much of his future work. They centered on advocating for the education of poor and disabled students and critiquing and demystifying the stigmatization of students who are perfectly capable of learning.

In 1967, 36 Children (New American Library, New York, 1967) was also published, and Kohl was drawn into national debates on the education of African American and other minority student and into conversations on school reform and the nature of teaching and learning. He is still engaged in them now having lived through cycles of reform and reaction, none of which succeeded in creating excellent education for the children of the poor. The problems persist, and he still believes that by hard, imaginative effort, they can be solved.

In 1968, Kohl moved to Berkeley, California, where his family lived for the next nine years. He was a Visiting Associate Professor, half time in the English Department and half in the School of Education, at the University of California, Berkeley during the spring semester of 1968. Then, he received a grant from the Carnegie Corporation of New York (September 1968 to June 1969) to work with Allan Kaprow, the "happener" who was a Professor of Art at the State University of New York, Stony Brook, on teacher education and the development of creative curriculum that crossed disciplinary and artistic boundaries. Working with Kaprow freed him to cross boundaries, work with students in theater, and experiment with interactive media. The unlikely marriage, made by Margaret Mahoney of Carnegie, had a profound influence on Kohl's teaching and thinking about learning.

An alternative high school, Other Ways emerged during that collaboration and it was supported, in 1969, by a grant from the Carnegie Corporation (September 1969 to June 1970) and then the Ford Foundation (September 1970 to June 1971). It was one of the first attempts to create a series of alternative educational options within public school systems and part of the free school movement. An assessment by the Scientific Analysis Corp. documents that during Kohl's tenure, Other Ways offered no basic skills, focusing instead on subjects such as Taoist Science, the Unconscious and Decision Making, Guerrilla Theatre, Urban Survival, Seamanship, etc. For that reason, students were simultaneously enrolled at one of the regular secondary schools, where they also took classes. In Spring 1971, Other Ways became part of the Berkeley Experimental Schools Project (BESP), leading to Kohl's resignation, due to loss of the school's independence as well as staff and student conflict. BESP was one of eight projects funded nationally by the federal Experimental Schools Program (ESP), which was launched in 1970 as part of the U.S. Office of Education. The announced federal aim of the program was to effect “comprehensive change” within local school districts. Kohl's perspective on Other Ways can be found in Half the House (Dutton, New York, 1974). One student's experience at the school, including an abusive sexual relationship with an Other Ways teacher and administrator that began during Kohl's tenure, is documented in the voluminous diary writings of Tammy Bellah that appear in Melanie Bellah's Tammy: A Biography of a Young Girl (Aten Press, 1999). Tammy Bellah was the eldest daughter of sociologist Robert N. Bellah. She committed suicide in 1973.

In 1972, Kohl became co-director of the teacher education program at the Center for Open Learning and Teaching, and he taught a combined kindergarten–first grade at a Berkeley public elementary school while he was acting as a master teacher for its teacher education students.

For ten years (1970 to 1982), he wrote a monthly column for Teacher Magazine, and he contributed many reviews and articles for publications such as The New York Times, The Times, The Nation, and The New York Review of Books. Kohl also wrote a number of books during that period including The Open Classroom, Golden Boy as Anthony Cool, Reading, How to, A Book of Puzzlements, Mathematical Puzzlements, On Teaching, Growing With Your Children, and Half the House.

Kohl's writing had significant influence on other education writers and theorists including John Holt, Jonathan Kozol, Richard Farson, Ivan Illich, Paul Goodman, George Dennison, James Herndon, Charles E. Silberman, John Taylor Gatto, Neil Postman and others.

In 1976, Herbert and Judith Kohl, his wife, wrote The View from the Oak, which won the 1978 National Book Award, Children's Literature.

In 1977, they moved to Point Arena, California, and established the Coastal Ridge Research and Education Center. Over the years, it has sponsored a summer camp, where he taught theater, and hosted a number of seminars on education and social justice. Such seminars have involved educators such as Myles Horton and Septum Clarke of the Highlander Center, Joseph and Helen Featherstone, William Ayers, Len Solo, Ira Glaser, Norm Fruchter, Asa Hilliard, Courtney Cazden, Phillip Lopate, Cynthia Brown, and Ron Jones. The Center also worked with Amnesty International developing a curriculum on conscience and human rights and with the ACLU developing a Bill of Rights curriculum.

Kohl also spent a year (1985–1986) teaching in a one-room schoolhouse in Point Arena, and he created, under a grant from the Agency for International Development and the University of Massachusetts Amherst (June 1986 – January 1986), a month-long residential session and a semester's internship in the New York City schools for the heads of teachers' colleges from Botswana sponsored by UMass Amherst.

During the 1980s, Kohl also spent time working with a number of pioneers in the computer world. He was on the Board of the Atari Education Foundation and consulted with Alan Kay's Vivarium Project of Apple Computers. His work with computers also involved being a games columnist for Recreational Computing Magazine and Publish!, spending several years (1983–1985) as Director of Software Development for Scientific American, co-authoring four books on computer programming and games for Reston Publishing Company, and editing a series of books on games and computers for them as well. Also during that period, as a member of the Executive Board of PEN, American Center, he established the PEN American Center West.

Kohl continued writing over these years and teaching occasionally as a Research Fellow at the University of San Francisco. He was the Gordon Sanders Professor of Education at Hamline University in St. Paul in 1988–1989 and then later spent more time in the Twin Cities area, as Benedict Professor of Educational Studies at Carleton College in 1995. Meanwhile, he was engaged with developing pedagogical content and structure that would take advantage of the strengths and experiences of poor and minority students.

Throughout the 1980s, Herb and Judith Kohl worked with Myles Horton on his autobiography, The Long Haul (Doubleday, New York, 1990). It won the Robert F. Kennedy Book Award in 1991.

From September 1994 to June 1997, Kohl had the opportunity to work, through a grant from the Aaron Diamond Foundation, with the Fund for New York City Public Education September. The goal of the project was to design structures for the development of small, theme-based and community-oriented schools of choice within the city's public school system. The Fund morphed into New Visions Schools and is engaged in implementing that work.

In 1997, Kohl was appointed a Senior Fellow at the Open Society Institute, the US foundation that is part of the Soros Foundation Network. From September 1997 to June 1999, he worked towards planning a funding strategy in education for the Foundation, and in the process, he managed to support a number of projects that promise effective school reform.

Kohl has found himself both teaching and writing throughout his adult life. He feels that writing is a private matter, education a public one. They play off each other, nurturing and informing each other. Both are a source of energy and give him a feeling of being of use to others. His books published from 1982 to 1999 include Basic Skills (Little Brown, Boston, 1982), Growing Minds (Harper and Row, New York, 1986), Making Theater (Teachers and Writers Collaborative, New York, 1988), I Won't Learn from You (The New Press, New York, 1994), and Should We Burn Barbar? (The New Press, New York, 1995), and The Discipline of Hope (Simon and Schuster, New York, 1998).

== Later life ==
In the spring of 2000, after his Fellowship at the Open Society Institute was completed, Kohl accepted the challenge of building a small, autonomous teacher education program centered on equity and social justice at the University of San Francisco (USF). The Center for Teaching Excellence and Social Justice opened with 25 students in the fall of 2000. The first year was supported by a special innovative grant from the President of USF (January 2000 to January 2001). The next three years were supported by a grant from the William and Flora Hewlett Foundation (September 2001 to June 2004). Under the terms of the grant, the Center also worked on reform in the Oakland and San Francisco school districts.

Meanwhile, Kohl published a book of essays, Stupidity and Tears (The New Press, New York, 2003) and She Would Not be Moved (The New Press, New York, 2005).

In 2005, he left the program at USF after five years and accepted a year's appointment as Eugene Lang Visiting Professor for Issues of Social Change at Swarthmore College during the academic year of 2005–06.

Kohl returned to his home in Point Arena in the summer of 2006. Storms and water damage during the spring destroyed his study and many of his books and resources. It took months to rebuild, and some of the work is still going on. Nevertheless, he continued to write, and his book Painting Chinese (Bloomsbury, New York, 2007) was finished in Point Arena and published in 2007. In addition, a collection of his works, The Herb Kohl Reader (The New Press, New York, 2009) was published in 2009.

He continues to work with educators across the country. In particular he's currently collaborating with Kevin Truitt, formerly principal of Mission High School and currently Associate Superintendent of the San Francisco Unified School District, on a book about the complex, demanding, and often heart breaking lives of urban high school principals. The book proposes a way of supporting principals that is a cross between psychotherapy and dramaturgy, which they tried out for three years and decided to call edutherapy.

In 2012, Kohl published a collaborative book with Tom Oppenheim and the Stella Adler Acting Studio, of which he is Director, on advocating support for the arts, as necessary components of any decent public education. In conjunction with this book, "The Muses Go to School: Inspiring Stories about the Importance of Arts in Education," he interviewed artists such as Phylicia Rashad, Rosie Perez, Philip Seymour Hoffman, Moises Kaufman, Bill T. Jones, and Whoopi Goldberg, and educators such as Maxine Greene, Frances Lucerna, Lisa Delpit, and Steve Seidel.

Kohl is also currently teaching an essay writing class in Point Arena and working on a book of personal essays.

At the center of all of his work is the belief that a quality education for all children is a pedagogical imperative and a social justice issue.

== Partial bibliography ==
- The Age of Complexity, New American Library, 1965 ISBN 978-0-451-60606-8; Greenwood, 1977 (reprint) ISBN 978-0-8371-8354-1
- The Language and Education of the Deaf, Center for Urban Education, 1966
- Teaching the "Unteachable": The Story of an Experiment in Children's Writing, A New York Review Book, 1967
- 36 Children, New American Library, 1967 ISBN 978-0-451-03684-1; 1988 (reissue) ISBN 978-0-452-26463-2
- The Open Classroom, A New York Review Book, 1969 ISBN 978-0-394-43947-1
- Math, Writing & Games in the Open Classroom, Random House, 1973, ISBN 978-0-394-70995-6
- Half the House, Dutton, 1974 ISBN 0-525-12030-0
- Reading, How to: A People's Guide to Alternatives to Learning and Testing, Bantam Books, 1978 ISBN 978-0-525-18895-7
- Atari Games & Recreations, Reston Publishing, 1982
- Basic Skills: A Plan for Your Child, A Program for All Children, Little, Brown, 1982 ISBN 978-0-316-50136-1
- On Teaching, Schocken, 1987 ISBN 0-8052-3633-3
- A Book of Puzzlements: Play and Invention with Language, Schocken, 1987 ISBN 0-8052-3786-0
- Growing Minds: On Becoming a Teacher, HarperCollins, 1989, ISBN 978-0-06-132089-7
- The Question Is College: On Finding and Doing Work You Love, Crown, 1989 ISBN 978-0-8129-1698-0
- I Won't Learn from You! The Role of Assent in Learning, Milkweed Editions: Thistle Series of Essays 1991 ISBN 0-915943-64-6
- From Archetype to Zeitgeist: Powerful Ideas for Powerful Thinking, Little, Brown, 1992 ISBN 978-0-316-50138-5
- Nurturing One's Dreams: A Review of Paulo Freire's Pedagogy of Hope, Highlander Center Working Papers Series, 1994
- "I Won't Learn from You:" and Other Thoughts on Creative Maladjustment The New Press, 1994 ISBN 978-1-56584-095-9
- Should We Burn Babar? Essays on Children's Literature and the Power of Stories, The New Press, 1996 ISBN 1-56584-259-6
- The Discipline of Hope: Learning from a Lifetime of Teaching, Simon & Schuster, 1998 ISBN 0-684-81412-9
- A Grain of Poetry: How to Read Contemporary Poems and Make Them a Part of Your Life, HarperCollins, 1999 ISBN 978-0-06-018783-5
- Judith and Herbert Kohl, The View from the Oak: The Private Worlds of Other Creatures, New Press, 2000 ISBN 978-1-56584-636-4. — winner, 1978 National Book Award for Children's Literature
- Stupidity and Tears: Teaching and Learning in Troubled Times, New Press, 2004 ISBN 978-1-56584-851-1; 2005 (paperback) ISBN 978-1-56584-982-2
- She Would Not Be Moved: How We Tell the Story of Rosa Parks and the Montgomery Bus Boycott, New Press, 2005 ISBN 978-1-59558-020-7; 2006 (paperback) ISBN 978-1-59558-127-3
- Making Theater: Developing Plays With Young People, Teachers & Writers Collaborative, 2007 ISBN 978-0-915924-17-2
- Painting Chinese: A Lifelong Teacher Gains the Wisdom of Youth, Bloomsbury USA, 2007 ISBN 978-1-59691-052-2
- The Herb Kohl Reader: Awakening the Heart of Teaching, New Press, 2009 ISBN 978-1-59558-420-5
- The Muses Go to School: Conversations About the Necessity of Arts in Education, New Press, 2012 ISBN 978-1-59558-539-4
