= Eastham Public Library =

Public library of Eastham, Massachusetts

Coordinates: 41°49′57.85″N 69°58′58.48″W

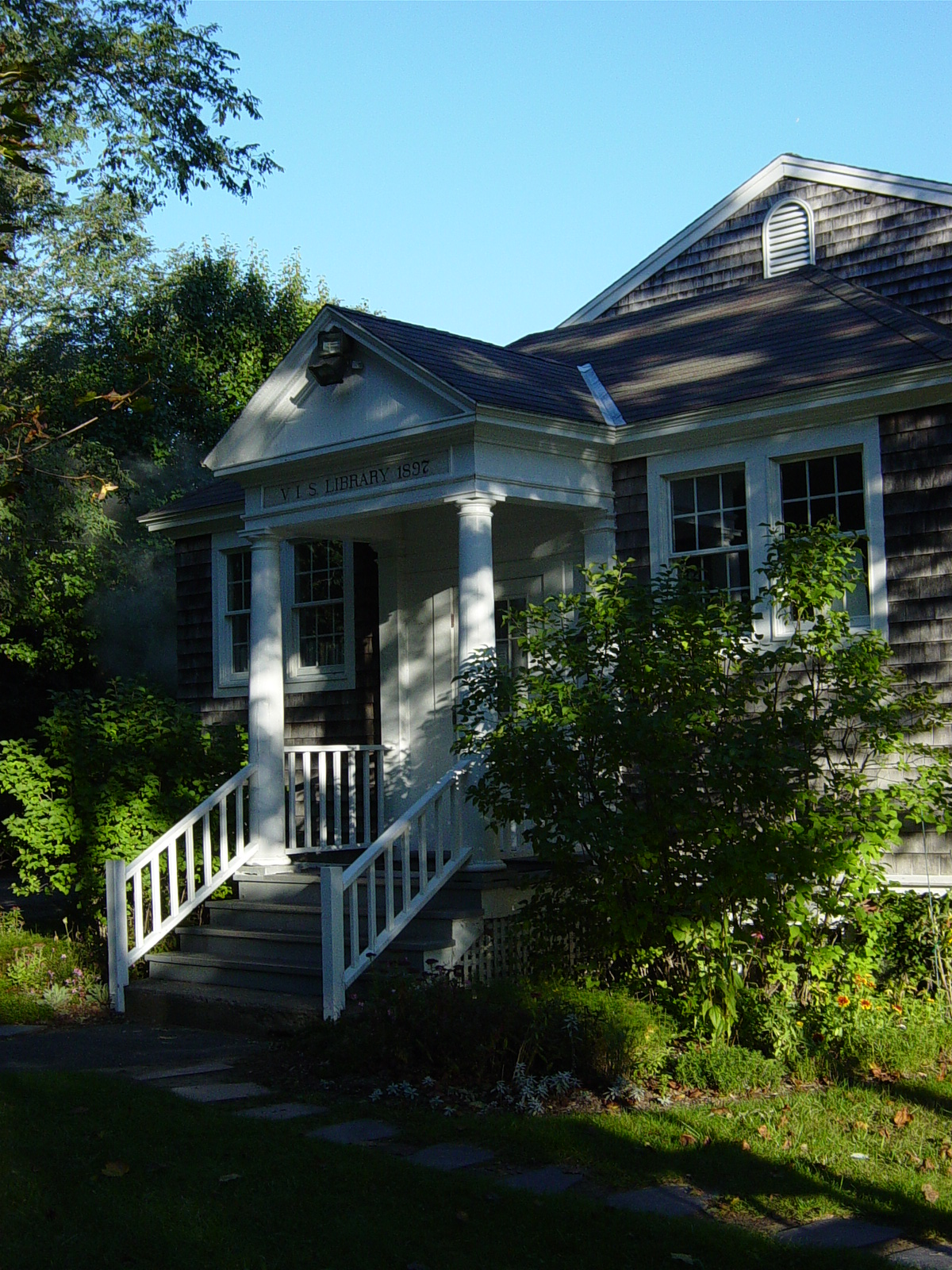

Eastham Public Library is the public library of Eastham, Massachusetts that has been serving the community for over 130 years. It provides a collection of print, non-print, and electronic resources for the community. The Eastham Public Library is a part of the Cape Libraries Automated Materials Sharing library network on Cape Cod and the Islands.

== History ==
In 1644, Eastham, Massachusetts was settled by Pilgrims who were no longer satisfied in the Plymouth Colony. The town's name was officially changed from Nauset to Eastham when the town was incorporated. Nevertheless, the official "creation" of Eastham's first library was not until February 11, 1878 when town meeting approved allotting $175 for a library.

The Eastham library was first housed in a building on Samoset Road that also contained a general store and the Post Office. William H. Nickerson gave the land that the library still resides on to the Village Improvement Society (V.I.S.) in 1887. It took several years to build the library, but the trustees opened the building to the public on January 8, 1898.

The V.I.S. eventually sold the library to the town in 1903 for one dollar. That same year, the library received $15,000 from the will of Robert C. Billings. In 1927, electricity was brought to the building and a toilet was installed in 1934. In 1961, the building was expanded to double its size in order to match the quickly growing town. Between 1961 and 1985, the year-round population of Eastham tripled and this meant that the library needed to expand as well. The library almost tripled in size and was opened to the public in July 1988.

In 1999, the part of the library that was the original library was added to the National Register of Historic Places as a part of the Eastham Center Historic District. The original library is the front room of the current library that now holds the Reference and Local History collections.

== Today ==
As of the 1988 addition, the library now has two floors. The lower level is divided into a children's room, a hall for young adults, a small multipurpose room, a staffroom, a restroom, storage, a conference room, and the Eastham Historical Society's archives. The top level holds the adult collection, which is composed of nonfiction, fiction, large print, audiovisual materials, and a magazine collection. There is a small reading room, public computers, two restrooms, and a reference/local history room as well. The local history section contains 1750 titles that reflect the town's long history and its position in history as one of the early settlements of the Mayflower pilgrims. Throughout the year, the library offers programs for adults, children, and teens. While the library is one of the lowest staffed libraries on Cape Cod, it stays open 5 days a week for a total of 38 hours.

=== Governance ===
The Board of Library Trustees is composed of three elected members who govern the library along with the library's director (an employee of the Town of Eastham)

=== Friends of the Eastham Library ===
For over 30 years, the library has received enormous support from the Friends of the Eastham Library. They provide the library with a volunteer corps of over 30 volunteers that the library heavily relies on in order to keep functioning. Most of the income of the Friends of the Eastham Library comes from membership dues and from book sales. The library received $32,000 from them in FY 2005 in order to purchase materials, furniture, books, and equipment. The money is also used to support programs for adults and children.

=== Quick Facts ===
Address: 190 Samoset Road, Eastham, MA
Wireless: Available 24/7 because it is accessible from outside the library
Archives: The Eastham Historical Society's archives are housed in the Vivian Andrist Room on the lower level and the public can access it by appointment.
Layout: Two floors- the lower level is mostly underground
Square Footage: 8,632 square feet (801.9 m^{2})

Hours

- Monday- Closed
- Tuesday- 10am to 8pm
- Wednesday- 10am to 4pm
- Thursday-10am to 8pm
- Friday- 10am to 4pm
- Saturday- 10am to 4pm
- Sunday- Closed

Circulation

- In 1898, the library contained 1,351 volumes and the circulation was 1,305
- In 1948, the library owned 7,125 volumes and circulated 4,264 items
- In 1988, the collection was 17,534 volumes because it was heavily weeded in preparation for the new addition. The circulation was still 61,658.
- In 1998, the library had 36,979 items in its collection and circulation was at 94,389.
- In 2008, the library circulated 107,897 items (it has consistently stayed over 100,000 items since 2000) and it had 48,860 items in its collection.

== The future ==
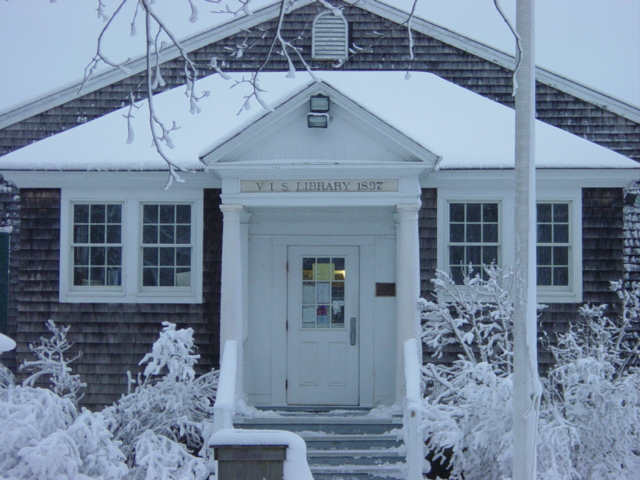

The library building is now over 20 years old and is not compliant with Americans with Disabilities Act of 1990. In 2005, the Board of Trustees and library staff began to look into expanding the library to meet the new needs of the ever-increasing Eastham community. They hope to demolish everything but the historic portion of the current library and build a 16,800-square-foot (1,560 m^{2}) building. The new building would be ADA compliant (important for Eastham's generally older population, especially) and energy efficient, with flexible spaces to provide a cultural center for the town to use as needed. The new library would also provide much needed space for new technologies and formats.
