= Cooks Brook (Newfoundland) =

Stream in Newfoundland, Canada

Cooks Brook is a stream in Newfoundland, Canada, that runs into the Humber Arm, on the west coast of the island. There is a day use park at the ocean, which is used by kayakers.

The stream was named for Captain James Cook, who surveyed the area in 1767.
