= The Outermost House =

1928 book by Henry Beston

The Outermost House: A Year of Life on the Great Beach of Cape Cod
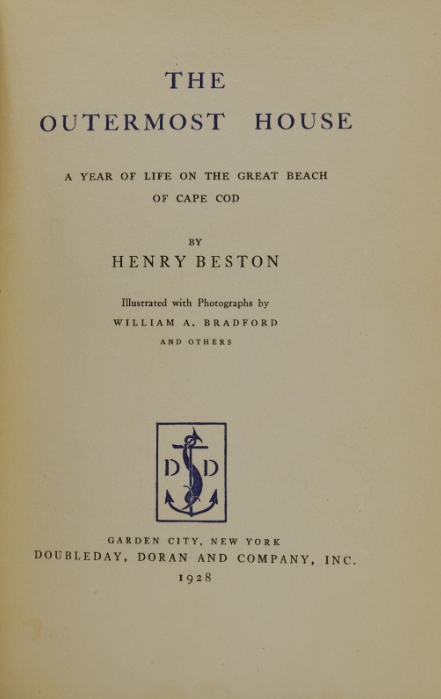
- Title page for The Outermost House: A Year of Life on the Great Beach of Cape Cod (1928)
- Author: Henry Beston
- Language: English
- Genre: Autobiography
- Publisher: Doubleday, Doran and Co.
- Publication date: 1928
- Publication place: United States
- Media type: Print
- Pages: 222
- OCLC: 2228380
- LC Class: F72.C3

The Outermost House: A Year of Life on the Great Beach of Cape Cod is a book by naturalist writer Henry Beston that chronicles a year Beston spent living on the dunes of Cape Cod. It was published in 1928 by Doubleday and Doran and later by Henry Holt and Company.

Beston's "Fo'castle," the 20x16 beach cottage which served as the setting for The Outermost House, was built in June 1925, and claimed by the sea in February 1978. Beston (born Henry Beston Sheahan in 1888; died 1968) named the cottage "the Fo'castle" because its ten windows and its commanding presence on top of a dune overlooking the open Atlantic Ocean gave him the feeling of being aboard a ship. Over time, the structure also came to be known as "The Outermost House."

== Writing and publication ==
Having spent considerable time on the Cape after completing a magazine assignment called "The Wardens of Cape Cod", about the Coast Guard officers of the Outer Cape, Beston drew up floor plans for a house on the dunes two miles south of the Nauset Coast Guard station in Eastham, Massachusetts. Carpenter Harvey Moore and his crew were the builders.

Beston intended to use the cottage as a retreat to visit whenever he could, but soon found he did not want to leave. "[A]s the year lengthened into autumn, the beauty and mystery of this earth and outer sea so possessed and held me that I could not go," he wrote in The Outermost House.

For the next couple of years, Beston would come and go from his dune refuge, keeping extensive notes on his observations of life on the beach. His meditation on surf ("The Headlong Wave"), experiences on the winter beach, and his view of life after his beach stay were molded together into one "Year of Life on the Great Beach of Cape Cod."

His observation, "We need another and a wiser and perhaps a more mystical concept of animals," is frequently quoted by wildlife and animal enthusiasts everywhere.

Beston finally left the "Fo'castle" in September 1927. He returned to his native hometown of Quincy, Massachusetts, and proposed marriage to writer Elizabeth Coatsworth. The couple had a long courtship period, but when Coatsworth saw that he had many notes but no manuscript from his stay on the beach, she said, "No book, no marriage." The manuscript was completed by April 1928, and The Outermost House was published in October 1928. Beston and Coatsworth were married in June 1929 and honeymooned at the Fo'castle for two weeks, but the couple seldom returned to the beach cottage after that.

== Later events ==
A winter storm in 1933 nearly claimed the Fo'castle, and the house had to be moved back on the dune. In 1944, the dune that the house sat on began to hollow out, forcing another move. After replacing the original fireplace with a wood stove and making a few other changes, Beston had the house moved back behind the dune, next to Nauset Marsh. The house remained there until February 1978, when the storm known as "The Blizzard of '78" sent high tides over the barrier beach and swept the Fo'castle away. The original locations of the house have since been covered by the waves of the Atlantic.

Beston donated the Fo'castle to the Massachusetts Audubon Society in 1959, shortly before the establishment of the Cape Cod National Seashore. Massachusetts Audubon rented out Beston's house to its members, as Beston had requested that it be used as "a refuge and observation station for all good naturalists."

In 1964, less than four years before Beston's death, Massachusetts First Lady Toni Peabody and Ivan Sandrof of the Worcester Telegram & Gazette put together a special dedication ceremony at Coast Guard Beach, where the "Fo'castle" was dedicated as a National Literary Landmark. Hundreds were on hand to watch Beston, now in ill health, receive recognition for his work. "Your book is one of the reasons that the Cape Cod National Seashore exists today," Massachusetts Governor Endicott Peabody declared. It was also revealed during this ceremony that the National Park Service (part of the U.S. Department of the Interior) referred to The Outermost House on several occasions in its reports that were filed when making its evaluation of the Outer Cape land for National Park status in the 1950s.
