= Governor Clay =

American songwriter

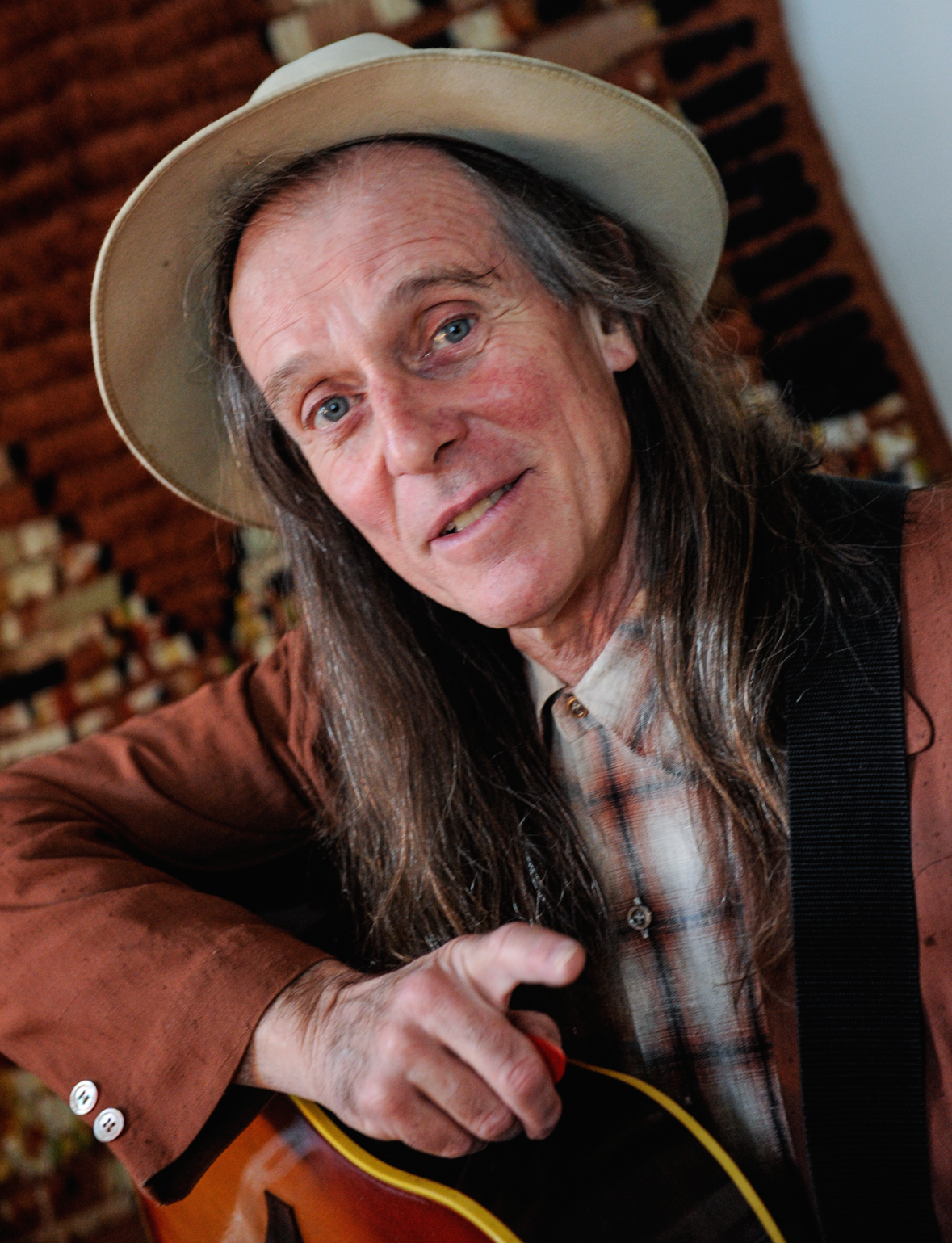

Background information
- Birth name: Karl Caulkins Bruder
- Born: July 7, 1945 (age 80)
- Origin: Tuscaloosa, Alabama
- Genres: Folk music
- Occupation(s): Songwriter, performer
- Years active: 1967 - present
- Website: www.lookslikeclay.com

Governor Clay (born 1945, as Karl Caulkins Bruder) is an American songwriter and performer. He began his career in San Francisco in 1967. He appears regularly in southern Europe and New York City. Although he works in the cowboy ballad tradition, he has collaborated with artists including the poet James Koller, saxophonist Steve Lacy, and contemporary composer Peter Garland. His albums are conceived as chapters in an ongoing historical novel. He has been published in books and journals on both sides of the Atlantic. Governor Clay currently lives in the Burgundy region of France.

== Life and career ==
Governor Clay was born on July 7, 1945, in Tuscaloosa, Alabama. His mother came from a long line of Southerners whose origins were Irish, while his father was the son of immigrants from Budapest, Hungary. The family settled in Kansas when he was five years old. He appeared in plays that his father staged, and his mother taught him to play the piano. In 1965 he worked for a month laying pipe in Fort Worth, Texas, and used his wages to settle in California.

Governor Clay stayed in San Francisco for five years. He set out to become a songwriter and got his education at the Fillmore Auditorium, in various "painted lady" houses, and in Golden Gate Park. Ramblin’ Jack Elliott, among others, had a profound effect on him. He encountered the poet James Koller, and the anarchist Samuel Quick Spencer. In 1970 he moved to Denver and spent a year working on a small stage at the Columbia Tavern, where the clientele favored country western music. It was during this time that Governor Clay began to perform his own songs. He went to Paris in 1972, having been invited to join Bruce Barthol's band. Nothing came of the project, but he did make his first recordings, working after hours at a studio in Pigalle. Governor Clay then travelled back and forth between Europe and America for twenty years, doing his show in festivals and theaters and road houses. He collaborated with Koller and Garland to conceive and perform "The Bone Show" in Chicago. Soon afterwards he moved to France, and began working with American singers who were touring in Europe, such as Wanda Jackson, Doug Kershaw and Mike Greene. He met Steve Lacy onstage in Switzerland, and they performed together in Sardinia for a City Lights Bookstore celebration. He often travelled with James Koller, bringing their show, which combined folk music and poems, to audiences in Italy and France. In 2006 he accepted an offer to play the piano in Marrakech, and stayed for three years. Governor Clay's songs have been published in poetry magazines on both sides of the Atlantic.

== Discography ==
=== Studio ===
- 2016: The South (Catalpa Publishing Company CD, CMD 01)
- 2012: Bourbon Jane (Equinox CD, Private Edition)
- 2006: The Avalon Songbook (Druid City CD, CMD 0206)
- 1991: The Cottonmouth (ESS CD, Private Edition)
- 1980: On The Beach (Northern Star LP #104087, re-issue CD EPM1, 2012)
- 1973: Blessings in Disguise (Studio Pigalle EP #1789)

=== Live ===
- 2006: Spotlight Blues (Druid City CD, CMD 0306)
- 1998: Ancestors at the Door (Cactus CD, CMD 14098)

=== With James Koller ===
- 2004: Black Corn Blues (La Forge CD, JKB 036)
- 2000: Crows Talk To Him (Druid City CD, CMD 0100)

=== With Mike Greene ===
- 2001: A Talking Tree, Souls in the Rain (Cactus CD, CMD 17401)
- 1997: Southern Wind (Cactus CD, CMD 13897)

=== With J. Kirby ===
- 2002: Highway to Your Heart (Round Stake CD, RSTK 2303)

=== Compilations ===
- 1999: Westwind (Western Magazine CD, CMD 01)
- 1996: Musiques en Court (Anim's CD, Private Edition)

=== Videos ===
- 2018: Standing in the Rain
