= Cooks Brook Beach =

Beach in Massachusetts, United States

- Beach
- Location within Cape Cod Location within Massachusetts
- Coordinates: 41°51′52″N 70°00′29″W
- Location: Steele Road; North Eastham, Massachusetts

Cooks Brook Beach is a Town of Eastham beach on the bay side of Cape Cod, in North Eastham, Massachusetts. It is located at the end of Steele Road, which is off Massasoit Road.
