= The Cat Who Went to Heaven =

1930 novel by Elizabeth Coatsworth

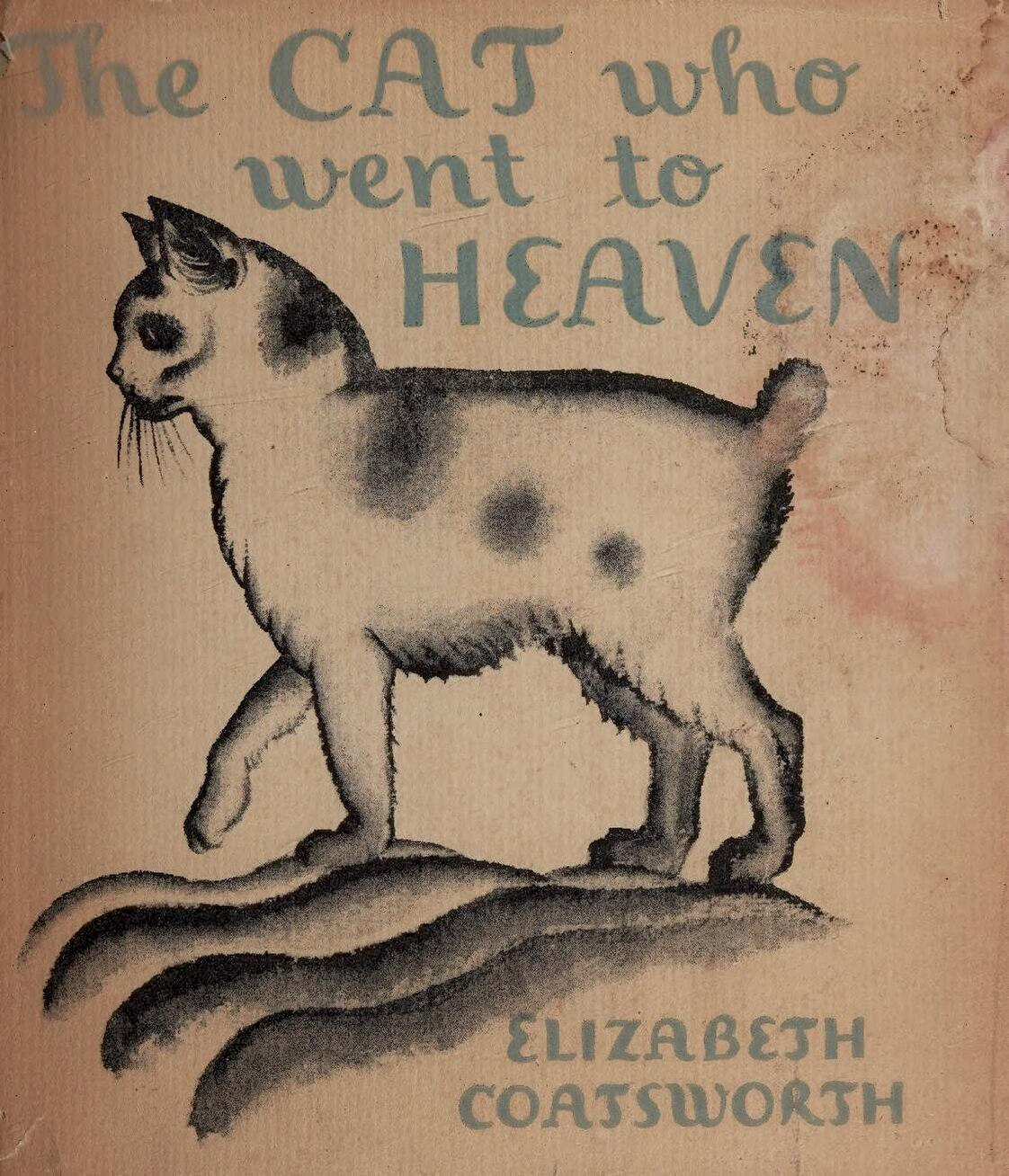
- Author: Elizabeth Coatsworth
- Illustrator: Lynd Ward
- Language: English
- Genre: Children's novel
- Publisher: Macmillan
- Publication date: 1930
- Publication place: United States
- Media type: Print (Hardback & Paperback)
- Pages: 88
- Text: The Cat Who Went to Heaven at Wikisource

The Cat Who Went to Heaven is a 1930 novel by Elizabeth Coatsworth that won the Newbery Medal for excellence in American children's literature in 1931. On January 1, 2026, the novel entered the public domain in the USA. The story is about a penniless Japanese artist and a calico cat his housekeeper brings home.

The storyline is supposedly based on an old Buddhist folk tale, and includes, as asides, a short telling of the Buddha's life, and brief accounts of some of the Buddha's previous lifetimes as animals, as in the Jataka tales.

At the end of each of the eight chapters is one of the housekeeper's songs.

== Plot ==
A poor Japanese artist sends his housekeeper out with a few small coins to buy food. Instead, she brings home a cat from the village, stating that the house is "lonely". The painter is very unhappy with this choice, as he is hungry. He remarks that he cannot even remember what rice cakes taste like, and states that cats are devils. However, he is somewhat consoled when he notices that the cat's white coat actually has three colors, which is considered lucky.

The unusually good behavior of the cat causes the painter to feel more affectionate, and he names the animal "Good Fortune". At breakfast, the painter notices that the cat appears to be paying homage to the image of the Buddha, and he reflects on his own lack of prayer because of the hard times he has lived through. Soon after, he notices the hungry cat catch, and then gently release, a small bird. The cat behaves very well, even removing itself from the room when it cannot be useful, and following proper social behavior.

Almost completely destitute, the painter is given a commission by the priests at the local temple. They hired him because of a divination; they had put slips of paper with various artists' names out in the courtyard, and his was the one left after the others had blown away. The artist has to paint a picture of the dying Buddha, surrounded by animals who came to pay homage to him. The artist is given a large sum of money as a first payment, to "put his mind at ease".

As the artist progresses with the painting, he meditates on the life of the Buddha and the Buddha's previous lives, in order to be able to paint each part of the scene sincerely.

Towards the end of the painting process, and after painting many other animals, the painter realizes that his cat, whom he now sees as a truly noble being, cannot be represented in the painting. The story says that the traditional belief in his time was that cats are supposedly cursed, because of their pride and sense of superiority, which apparently caused them to refuse to bow before the Buddha in his lifetime, and that this therefore means they are barred from achieving Nirvana. Consequently, the prevailing thought is that no cat may go to Heaven.

When the picture is completed, Good Fortune seems to notice and sadly protests the lack of any cat in the painting. Deeply touched by her grief, the artist finally paints a small white cat, aware however that this may displease the priests. Upon seeing that the artist has done this, Good Fortune dies of joy. By her grave is a peach tree with a bell hanging on it; the housekeeper sings that she can hear the bell singing "Rejoice!"

The painting is finally delivered, and is greatly praised by the chief priest until he notices the presence of a cat, at which point he rejects it completely and plans to burn it. The morning brings the news of a miracle: the painter arrives to find the picture being adored in the temple. The image has miraculously changed: the dying Buddha now extends his hand in blessing over the white cat sitting right next to him.
