= Henry Beston =

American writer (1888–1968)

Henry Beston (June 1, 1888 – April 15, 1968) is the pen name of an American writer and naturalist, best known as the author of The Outermost House, written in 1928.

== Early life and work ==
He was born Henry Beston Sheahan, in Quincy, Massachusetts and grew up there. His parents were the physician Dr. Joseph Sheahan and Marie Louise (Maurice) Beston Sheahan. His brother George became a physician.

He attended Adams Academy in Quincy before earning his B.A. (1909) and M.A. (1911) from Harvard College. While at Harvard, he lived at the historic Parson Capen House in Topsfield, Massachusetts.

In 1912, he took up teaching at the University of Lyon. In 1914, he returned to Harvard as an English department assistant. Beston joined the French army in 1915 and served as an ambulance driver. His service in le Bois le Pretre and at the Battle of Verdun was described in his first book, A Volunteer Poilu. In 1918, he became a press representative for the U.S. Navy. Highlights from this period include being the only American correspondent to travel with the British Grand Fleet and to be aboard an American destroyer during combat engagement and sinking. His second book of journalistic work, Full Speed Ahead, described these experiences.

Following the end of World War I, he began writing fairy tales under the name "Henry Beston". In 1919, The Firelight Fairy Book was published, followed by The Starlight Wonder Book in 1923. During this time, he worked as an editor of The Living Age, an offshoot of The Atlantic Monthly.

This is when he met his future wife Elizabeth Coatsworth. She also was an author of children's literature. They married in 1929 and had two daughters, Margaret and Catherine.[3]:97 The family resided at Hingham, Massachusetts, and at Chimney Farm in Nobleboro, Maine.[6]

== The Outermost House ==
The Outermost House, now considered a Cape Cod nature literary classic, was written after Beston spent what he called "a year of life on the Great Beach of Cape Cod". Spiritually shaken by his experiences in World War I, Beston retreated to the outer beach at Eastham in search of peace and solitude.

"Nature is part of our humanity, and without some awareness of that divine mystery, man ceases to be man," Beston wrote.

Beston dedicated himself to being a "writer-naturalist". He is considered one of the founders of the modern environmental movement, and The Outermost House has been called one of the motivating factors behind the establishment of the Cape Cod National Seashore. Author Rachel Carson said that Beston was the only author who ever influenced her writing.

The 20x16 house, dubbed "the Fo'castle" by Beston, was built by Eastham carpenter Harvey Moore in the late spring of 1925. Beston stayed there, on and off, for about two years, leaving the beach occasionally, but he usually was on the beach for the many severe storms that struck the Cape in the winter. His house was located two miles south of the Nauset Coast Guard Station, with the Atlantic Ocean near his front door and Nauset Marsh behind him. His only neighbors were the Coast Guardsmen, who patrolled the beach.

The Outermost House was published in 1928, and has gone through dozens of printings since then. An audiobook version was released in 2007.

== Leaving the Outermost House ==
Beston married writer Elizabeth Coatsworth in 1929, and the couple eventually bought a farmhouse called "Chimney Farm" in Nobleboro, Maine. Beston wrote several more books while living in Maine (Northern Farm and Herbs and the Earth among them), but never again approached the overall acclaim that he achieved in The Outermost House.

== Later career and life ==
In the 1940s, Beston received honorary doctorates from Bowdoin College, Dartmouth College, and University of Maine and was made honorary member of Phi Beta Kappa at Harvard. He was also made honorary editor of National Audubon Magazine. In 1949, a twentieth-anniversary edition of The Outermost House was released.

Beston edited an anthology of writings about Maine, White Pine and Blue Water (1950). Throughout the 1950s, Beston lectured regularly at Dartmouth College and wrote for publications such as The Atlantic and Christian Science Monitor. He also revised his earlier work in children's literature and published Henry Beston's Fairy Tales in 1952. He was elected a Fellow of the American Academy of Arts and Sciences (AAAS) in 1954. In 1959, he was the third recipient of the AAAS Emerson-Thoreau Medal, previously awarded to only Robert Frost and T. S. Eliot.

Beston donated the "Fo'castle" to the Massachusetts Audubon Society in 1959. One of its tenants was a woman from Sharon, Massachusetts named Nan Turner Waldron, who would spend several weeks each year there from 1961 to 1977. Her experiences are chronicled in the book Journey to Outermost House.

With his health deteriorating, Beston visited the beach in Eastham one last time on October 11, 1964, when his famous house there was dedicated as a National Literary Landmark.

Beston died on April 15, 1968, in Nobleboro, Maine, and is buried in a small cemetery at Chimney Farm. Chimney Farm was listed on the National Register of Historic Places in 2007.

== Quotes ==
His philosophical perspective in natural history is reflected in many quotes by Henry Beston being cited. An example is, The animal shall not be measured by man. In a world older and more complete than ours, they move finished and complete, gifted with extension of the senses we have lost or never attained, living by voices we shall never hear. They are not brethren; they are not underlings; they are other nations, caught with ourselves in the net of life and time, fellow prisoners of the splendor and travail of the earth.

== Bibliography ==
- A Volunteer Poilu (1916)
- Full Speed Ahead (1919)
- The Firelight Fairy Book (1919)
- The Starlight Wonder Book (1921)
- Book of Gallant Vagabonds (1925)
- The Sons of Kai (1926)
- The Living Age (1921)
- The Outermost House (1928)
- Herbs and The Earth (1935)
- American Memory (1937)
- Five Bears and Miranda (1939)
- The Tree that Ran Away (1941)
- Chimney Farm Bedtime Stories (1941)
- The St. Lawrence (1942)
- Northern Farm: A Chronicle of Maine (1948)
- White Pine and Blue Water: A State of Maine Reader (1950) (editor)
- Henry Beston's Fairy Tales (1952)
- Especially Maine: The Natural World of Henry Beston (1972)
