= Nobleboro, Maine =

- Town
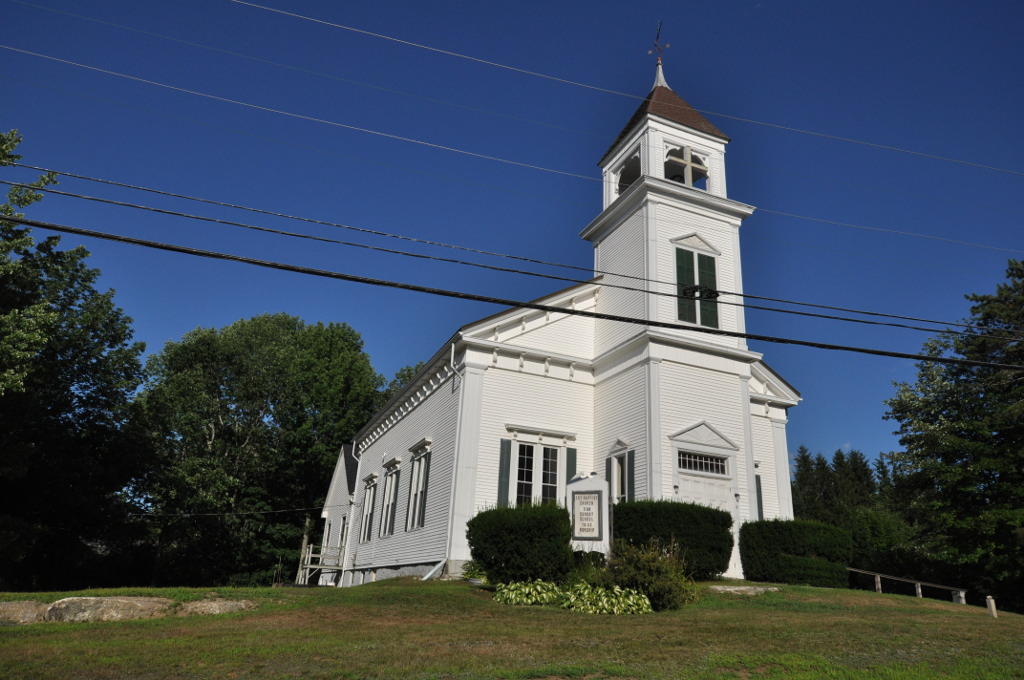
- Baptist church in Nobleboro
- Motto: The Little Town with the Big Heart
- Location in Lincoln County and the state of Maine.
- Coordinates: 44°06′56″N 69°28′47″W
- Country: United States
- State: Maine
- County: Lincoln
- Incorporated: November 20, 1788
- Named for: Arthur Noble

Area
  - Total: 23.11 sq mi (59.85 km^{2})
  - Land: 18.93 sq mi (49.03 km^{2})
  - Water: 4.18 sq mi (10.83 km^{2})
- Elevation: 62 ft (19 m)

Population (2020)
  - Total: 1,791
  - Density: 95/sq mi (36.5/km^{2})
- Time zone: UTC-5 (Eastern (EST))
  - Summer (DST): UTC-4 (EDT)
- ZIP code: 04555
- Area code: 207
- FIPS code: 23-49660
- GNIS feature ID: 582627
- Website: www.nobleboro.maine.gov

Nobleboro, founded in 1788, is a town in Lincoln County, Maine, United States. The population was 1,791 at the 2020 census. Nobleboro is named for Arthur Noble's son Arthur II. Part of Nobleboro was part of Shem Drowne's claim in the 1730s.

== History ==
On August 7, 1823, Maine's first recorded meteorite fall occurred in Nobleboro. Observers initially mistook it for musket fire. The meteorite is stored at the Buseck Center for Meteorite Studies at Arizona State University.

== Geography ==
According to the United States Census Bureau, the town has an area of 23.11 square miles (59.85 km^{2}), of which 18.93 square miles (49.03 km^{2}) is land and 4.18 square miles (10.83 km^{2}) is water. Notable lakes are Damariscotta Lake and Pemaquid Pond.

=== Climate ===
This climatic region is typified by large seasonal temperature differences, with warm to hot (and often humid) summers and cold (sometimes severely cold) winters. According to the Köppen Climate Classification system, Nobleboro has a humid continental climate, abbreviated "Dfb" on climate maps.

== Demographics ==
Historical population
Census	Pop.	Note	%±
1790	1,206		—
1800	804		−33.3%
1810	1,206		50.0%
1820	1,583		31.3%
1830	1,876		18.5%
1840	2,210		17.8%
1850	1,408		−36.3%
1860	1,438		2.1%
1870	1,150		−20.0%
1880	1,142		−0.7%
1890	947		−17.1%
1900	810		−14.5%
1910	755		−6.8%
1920	666		−11.8%
1930	599		−10.1%
1940	665		11.0%
1950	654		−1.7%
1960	679		3.8%
1970	850		25.2%
1980	1,154		35.8%
1990	1,455		26.1%
2000	1,626		11.8%
2010	1,643		1.0%
2020	1,791		9.0%
U.S. Decennial Census

=== 2010 census ===
As of the census of 2010, there were 1,643 people, 714 households, and 471 families living in the town. The population density was 86.8 inhabitants per square mile (33.5/km^{2}). There were 1,106 housing units at an average density of 58.4 per square mile (22.5/km^{2}). The racial makeup of the town was 98.4% White, 0.1% African American, 0.5% Native American, 0.4% Asian, 0.1% from other races, and 0.5% from two or more races. Hispanic or Latino of any race were 0.2% of the population.

There were 714 households, of which 27.5% had children under the age of 18 living with them, 52.9% were married couples living together, 8.8% had a female householder with no husband present, 4.2% had a male householder with no wife present, and 34.0% were non-families. 25.9% of all households were made up of individuals, and 11.5% had someone living alone who was 65 years of age or older. The average household size was 2.30 and the average family size was 2.75.

The median age in the town was 46.9 years. 20% of residents were under the age of 18; 6.4% were between the ages of 18 and 24; 20.3% were from 25 to 44; 34.3% were from 45 to 64; and 19.1% were 65 years of age or older. The gender makeup of the town was 49.5% male and 50.5% female.

=== 2000 census ===
As of the census of 2000, there were 1,626 people, 678 households, and 465 families living in the town. The population density was 85.4 inhabitants per square mile (33.0/km^{2}). There were 1,092 housing units at an average density of 57.4 per square mile (22.2/km^{2}). The racial makeup of the town was 98.59% White, 0.12% African American, 0.06% Native American, 0.43% Asian, 0.06% from other races, and 0.74% from two or more races. Hispanic or Latino of any race were 0.49% of the population.

There were 678 households, out of which 30.8% had children under the age of 18 living with them, 57.7% were married couples living together, 7.7% had a female householder with no husband present, and 31.4% were non-families. 26.0% of all households were made up of individuals, and 10.8% had someone living alone who was 65 years of age or older. The average household size was 2.39 and the average family size was 2.89.

In the town, the population was spread out, with 24.8% under the age of 18, 5.5% from 18 to 24, 25.4% from 25 to 44, 29.2% from 45 to 64, and 15.1% who were 65 years of age or older. The median age was 42 years. For every 100 females there were 91.7 males. For every 100 females aged 18 and over, there were 89.3 males.

The median income for a household in the town was $39,805, and the median income for a family was $46,838. Males had a median income of $32,104 versus $24,107 for females. The per capita income for the town was $21,373. About 5.4% of families and 7.7% of the population were below the poverty line, including 9.2% of those under aged 18 and 9.2% of those age 65 or over.

== Transportation ==
Nobleboro is served by U.S. Route 1 and the Rockland Branch Railroad passes through the town.

== Education ==
The school district is the Nobleboro School District. Nobleboro Central School is a part of the Central Lincoln County School System (Alternative Organizational Structure 93).

For high school, AOS 93 does not have a public high school. It sends high school students to Lincoln Academy, a private school, and pays tuition. Students in the AOS 93 area are free to select other high schools instead, with tuition paid there.

== Notable people ==
- Henry Beston, author and his wife Elizabeth Coatsworth, author
- Chloe Maxmin, state senator
- Linwood E. Palmer Jr., state legislator
- Val Picinich, baseball catcher
- Shoshana Zuboff, author and surveillance economics scholar
