= Elizabeth Coatsworth =

American poet

- Coatsworth
- Born: Elizabeth Jane Coatsworth; May 31, 1893; Buffalo, New York, US
- Died: August 31, 1986 (aged 93); Nobleboro, Maine, US
- Resting place: Nobleboro, Maine
- Education: Vassar College; Columbia University (M.A.)
- Occupation: Writer
- Writing career
- Genres: Children's and adult novels, picture books, poetry
- Notable works: The Cat Who Went to Heaven; Away Goes Sally
- Notable awards: Newbery Medal; 1931

Elizabeth Jane Coatsworth (May 31, 1893 – August 31, 1986) was an American writer of fiction and poetry for children and adults. She won the 1931 Newbery Medal from the American Library Association award recognizing The Cat Who Went to Heaven as the previous year's "most distinguished contribution to American literature for children." In 1968 she was a highly commended runner-up for the biennial international Hans Christian Andersen Award for children's writers.

== Life ==
Elizabeth Coatsworth was born on May 31, 1893, to Ida Reid and William T. Coatsworth, a prosperous grain merchant in Buffalo, New York. She attended Buffalo Seminary, a private girls' school, and spent summers with her family on Lake Erie's Canadian shore. She began traveling as a child, visiting the Alps and Egypt at age five. Coatsworth graduated from Vassar College in 1915 as salutatorian. In 1916 she received a Master of Arts from Columbia University. She then traveled to eastern Asia, riding horseback through the Philippines, exploring Indonesia and China, and sleeping in a Buddhist monastery. Her travels influenced her writing.

In 1929, she married writer Henry Beston, with whom she had two daughters, Margaret and Catherine. They lived in Hingham, Massachusetts, and at Chimney Farm in Nobleboro, Maine. Her daughter, Kate Barnes, also became an accomplished writer and was named the first Poet Laureate of Maine.

Coatsworth died at her home in Nobleboro on August 31, 1986. Her papers are held in the Kerlan Collection at the University of Minnesota and at Bowdoin College, with a small archive from late in her career in the de Grummond Collection at the University of Southern Mississippi. There is also a collection of her papers at the Maine Women Writers' Collection at the University of New England in Portland, Maine.

== Career ==
Coatsworth began her career publishing her poetry in magazines. Her first book was a poetry collection for adults, Fox Footprints (1912). A conversation with her friend Louise Seaman, who had just founded the United States' first children's book publishing department at Macmillan, led Coatsworth to write her first children's book, The Cat and the Captain. In 1930 she published The Cat Who Went to Heaven. The story of an artist who is painting a picture of the Buddha for a group of monks, it won the Newbery Medal for "the most distinguished contribution to American literature for children".

Nineteenth-Century Children's Writers says "Coatsworth reached her apogee in her nature writing, notably The Incredible Tales". These four books were published for adults in the 1950s. They tell the story of the Perdrys, a family living in the forests of northern Maine who may not be entirely human.

Coatsworth had a long career, publishing over 90 books from 1910 to 1976.

== Selected works ==
=== For children ===
- The Cat and the Captain, illustrated by Gertrude Alice Kay (attributed as Gertrude Kaye), Macmillan, 1927
- The Cat Who Went to Heaven, ill. Lynd Ward, Macmillan, 1930
- The Golden Horseshoe, ill. Robert Lawson, Macmillan, 1935
- Sword of the Wilderness, ill. Harve Stein, Macmillan, 1936
- Alice-All-by-Herself, ill. Marguerite de Angeli, Macmillan, 1937
- Dancing Tom, ill. Grace Paull, Macmillan, 1938
- You Shall have a Carriage, ill. Henry Clarence Pitz, Macmillan, 1941
- Runaway Home, ill. Gustaf Tenggren, Row, Peterson and Company, 1942
- Indian Mound Farm, ill. Fermin Rocker, Macmillan, 1943
- Up Hill and Down: Stories, ill. James Davis, Knopf, 1947
- Night and the Cat, ill. Foujita, Macmillan, 1950
- Dollars for Luck, ill. George and Doris Hauman, Macmillan, 1951; reissued 1972 as The Sailing Hatrack, Blackie (UK)
- Cat Stories, ill. Feodor Stepanovich Rojankovsky, Simon & Schuster, 1953
- Dog Stories, ill. Rojankovsky, Simon & Schuster, 1953
- Old Whirlwind: The Story of Davy Crockett, ill. Manning Lee, Macmillan, 1953
- Horse Stories, by Kate Barnes and Coatsworth, ill. Rojankovsky, Simon & Schuster, 1954
- The Peddler's Cart, ill. Zhenya Gay, Macmillan, 1956
- Pika and the Roses, ill. Kurt Wiese, Pantheon, 1959
- Lonely Maria, ill. Evaline Ness, Pantheon, 1960
- The Noble Doll, ill. Leo Politi, Viking, 1961
- Chimney Farm Bedtime Stories, by Henry Beston and Coatsworth, ill. Maurice Day, Holt, Rinehart and Winston, 1966
- The Lucky Ones: Five Journeys Toward a Home, ill. Janet Doyle, Macmillan, 1968
- Under the Green Willow, ill Janina Domanska, Macmillan, 1971
- The Wanderers, ill. Trina Schart Hyman, Scholastic, 1972
- Pure Magic, ill. Ingrid Fetz, Macmillan 1973; reissued 1975 as The Werefox, Collier (US), and The Fox Boy, Blackie (UK)
- Marra's World, ill. Krystyna Turska, Greenwillow, 1975

A later edition of the first Sally book

Sally series

The five historical novels featuring "Sally" were all illustrated by Helen Sewell and published by Macmillan US.

- Away Goes Sally, 1934
- Five Bushel Farm, 1938
- The Fair American,1940
- The White Horse, 1942
- The Wonderful Day, 1946

=== For adults ===
Novels

- Here I Stay, Coward McCann, 1938
- The Trunk, Macmillan, 1941

The Incredible Tales

- The Enchanted, Pantheon, 1951
- Silky: An Incredible Tale, Pantheon, 1953
- Mountain Bride: An Incredible Tale, Pantheon 1954
- The White Room, Pantheon, 1958

Poetry

- Fox Footprints, Knopf, 1923, poetry
- Country Poems, Macmillan, 1942
- The Creaking Stair, Coward McCann, 1949

Other

- The Sun's Diary: A Book of Days for Any Year, Macmillan, 1929
- Country Neighborhood, Macmillan, 1945
- Maine Ways, Macmillan, 1947
- Especially Maine: The Natural World of Henry Beston from Cape Cod to the St. Lawrence; (editor), Stephen Greene, 1970
- Personal Geography: Almost an Autobiography, Stephen Greene, 1976

== See also ==
Awards
Preceded by Rachel Field	Newbery Medal winner 1931	Succeeded by Laura Adams Armer
