= Eastham, Massachusetts =

- Town
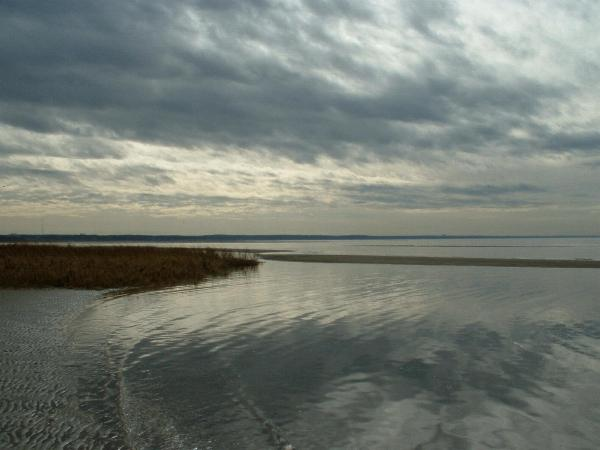
- First Encounter Beach along Cape Cod Bay in Eastham

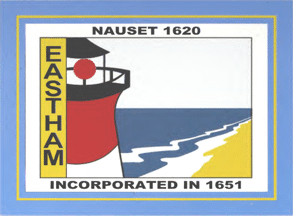
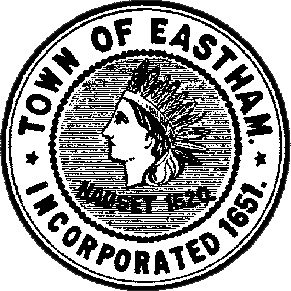
- Flag Seal

- Location in Barnstable County and the state of Massachusetts.
- Coordinates: 41°49′48″N 69°58′28″W
- Country: United States
- State: Massachusetts
- County: Barnstable
- Settled: 1644
- Incorporated: 1651
- Communities: Eastham; Campground Landing; Cooks Brook Beach; First Encounter Beach; Kingsbury Beach; North Eastham; Sunken Meadow Beach; Thumpertown Beach

Government
  - Type: Open town meeting
  - Town Administrator: Rich Bienvenue

Area
  - Total: 25.7 sq mi (66.6 km^{2})
  - Land: 14.0 sq mi (36.2 km^{2})
  - Water: 11.7 sq mi (30.4 km^{2})
- Elevation: 49 ft (15 m)

Population (2020)
  - Total: 5,752
  - Density: 410/sq mi (159/km^{2})
- Time zone: UTC−5 (Eastern)
  - Summer (DST): UTC−4 (Eastern)
- ZIP Code: 02642
- Area code: 508/774
- FIPS code: 25-19295
- GNIS feature ID: 0619414
- Website: www.eastham-ma.gov

Eastham (/ˈiːsthæm/) is a town in Barnstable County, Massachusetts. The population was 5,752 at the 2020 census.

== History ==
Originally inhabited by the Nauset tribe, Eastham was the site of the 1620 landing of a hunting party from the sailing vessel Mayflower, which had stopped in Provincetown harbor on Cape Cod Bay after a rough crossing of the Atlantic Ocean. This led to the first encounter of the Pilgrims with the local Nauset people at what became known as First Encounter Beach. The area would not be settled by Europeans, however, until 1644. The original lands included what are now the towns of Truro, Wellfleet, Eastham, Orleans and a small portion of Chatham. Eastham town was officially incorporated in 1651.

Eastham is the birthplace of Freeman Hatch, who in 1853 set the world record for a single-hull wooden sailing vessel from San Francisco around Cape Horn to Boston at the helm of the clipper ship Northern Light. Fishing and especially farming were early industries in the town, and writers and artists also came to the town. Gustavus Franklin Swift, born in Sagamore, MA, began his first meatpacking business in Eastham. It later moved to Brighton, MA, Albany, NY, and eventually started the meatpacking industry in Chicago. It was in Eastham that Henry Beston wrote The Outermost House. The town is discussed at some length in Henry David Thoreau's Cape Cod as the somewhat rugged site of one of New England's largest summer "camp-meeting" evangelistic gatherings in the mid-19th century. The gatherings were at times attended by at least "one hundred and fifty ministers (!) and five thousand hearers" at a site called Millennium Grove, in the northwest part of town. (The area is now a residential neighborhood, among the only reminders being Campground Road and Millennium Lane.)

Today, Eastham is known as the "Gateway" to the Cape Cod National Seashore, which was founded in 1961 by President John F. Kennedy to protect Cape Cod's coast from erosion and overpopulation. The town is the site of many beaches, both on the Atlantic and on Cape Cod Bay, as well as the Nauset Light, which was moved to the town in 1923 from its former location in Chatham, and the Three Sisters Lighthouses, which have since been moved away from their now-eroded perches on the coast to a field just west of Nauset Light.

== Geography ==
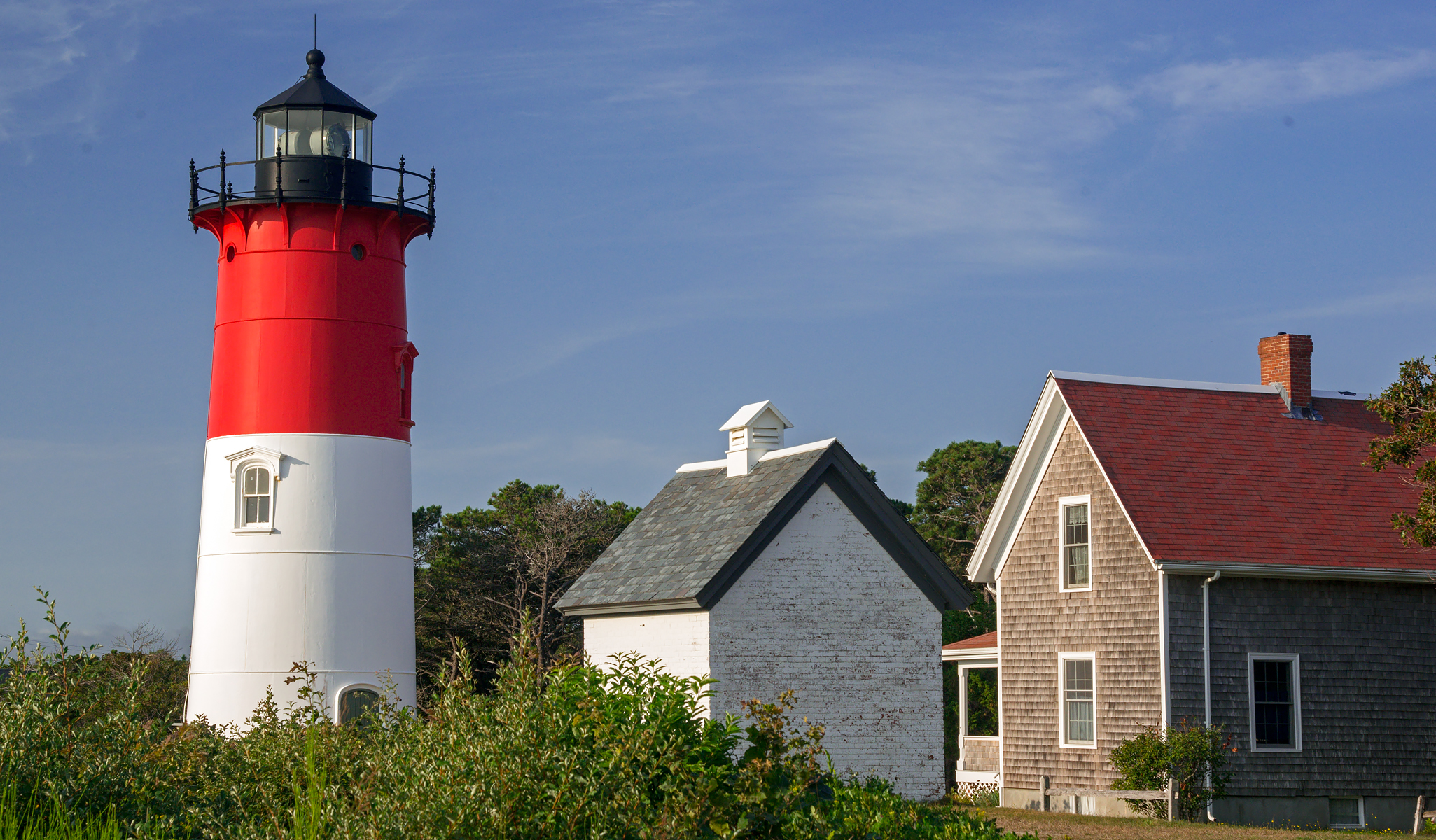
Nauset Light, oil house and lightkeeper's home on the Cape Cod National Seashore

According to the United States Census Bureau, the town has a total area of 25.7 square miles (66.6 km^{2}), of which 14.0 square miles (36.2 km^{2}) is land and 11.7 square miles (30.4 km^{2}), or 45.68%, is water. It is bordered by Cape Cod Bay and the Atlantic Ocean on its western and eastern sides, respectively. Eastham is also bordered by the towns of Wellfleet and Orleans on its northern and southern sides, respectively. Eastham is located on the "forearm" of Cape Cod, and is 23 miles (37 km) south of Provincetown, the same distance east-northeast of Barnstable, 38 miles (61 km) east of the Sagamore Bridge, and 92 miles (148 km) (by land) southeast of Boston.

Approximately one-third of the town is located within the Cape Cod National Seashore. There are several freshwater ponds near the center of town, the largest being called Great Pond, which has two public beaches. Powerboats with 50 and under horsepower motors are allowed on Great Pond after receiving an inspection and sticker from the Natural Resources Department. Water skiing is permitted only on Great Pond and only on even numbered days. On all other Eastham freshwater ponds motorboats three horsepower and under are allowed. Along the Atlantic coast, portions of the CCNS include several islands, divided by channels which lead from Nauset Bay and Salt Pond Bay to the ocean. The town also shares Town Cove with neighboring Orleans. Several creeks and the Herring River run inland from the bay side.

== Climate ==
The town of Eastham has a mild summer Humid continental climate (Dfb). The plant hardiness zone is 7a, with an average annual extreme minimum air temperature of 4.1 °F (–15.5 °C). The average seasonal (Nov-Apr) snowfall total is approximately 30 inches (76 cm). The average snowiest month is February, which corresponds to the annual peak in nor'easter activity.

Climate data for Eastham, Barnstable County, Massachusetts (1981–2010 averages).
Month	Jan	Feb	Mar	Apr	May	Jun	Jul	Aug	Sep	Oct	Nov	Dec	Year
Mean daily maximum °F (°C)	38.0 (3.3)	39.4 (4.1)	44.5 (6.9)	53.2 (11.8)	62.5 (16.9)	71.1 (21.7)	77.4 (25.2)	76.9 (24.9)	70.4 (21.3)	60.5 (15.8)	52.5 (11.4)	44.0 (6.7)	57.6 (14.2)
Daily mean °F (°C)	31.5 (−0.3)	32.7 (0.4)	37.7 (3.2)	46.2 (7.9)	55.1 (12.8)	64.0 (17.8)	70.5 (21.4)	70.1 (21.2)	63.9 (17.7)	54.2 (12.3)	46.1 (7.8)	37.3 (2.9)	50.9 (10.5)
Mean daily minimum °F (°C)	25.1 (−3.8)	25.9 (−3.4)	30.8 (−0.7)	39.1 (3.9)	47.7 (8.7)	57.0 (13.9)	63.6 (17.6)	63.4 (17.4)	57.3 (14.1)	47.8 (8.8)	39.8 (4.3)	30.6 (−0.8)	44.1 (6.7)
Average precipitation inches (mm)	3.73 (95)	3.24 (82)	4.14 (105)	4.29 (109)	3.32 (84)	3.56 (90)	2.74 (70)	3.87 (98)	3.60 (91)	4.19 (106)	4.30 (109)	3.84 (98)	44.82 (1,138)
Average relative humidity (%)	71.4	69.4	67.8	69.0	71.6	75.5	78.0	77.9	77.4	74.3	71.2	69.7	72.8
Source: PRISM Climate Group

== Transportation ==
U.S. Route 6 passes from south to north through the town. The Cape Cod Rail Trail, as well as several other bicycle routes, also pass through the town. There is no rail or air service in town; the nearest regional air service is at the Chatham Municipal Airport, though better and more regularly scheduled air service between the Cape and Boston can be found in Provincetown and Hyannis through Cape Air, and the nearest national and international air service can be found at Logan International Airport in Boston. Eastham is also served by an inexpensive regional bus service, The Flex.

== Demographics ==
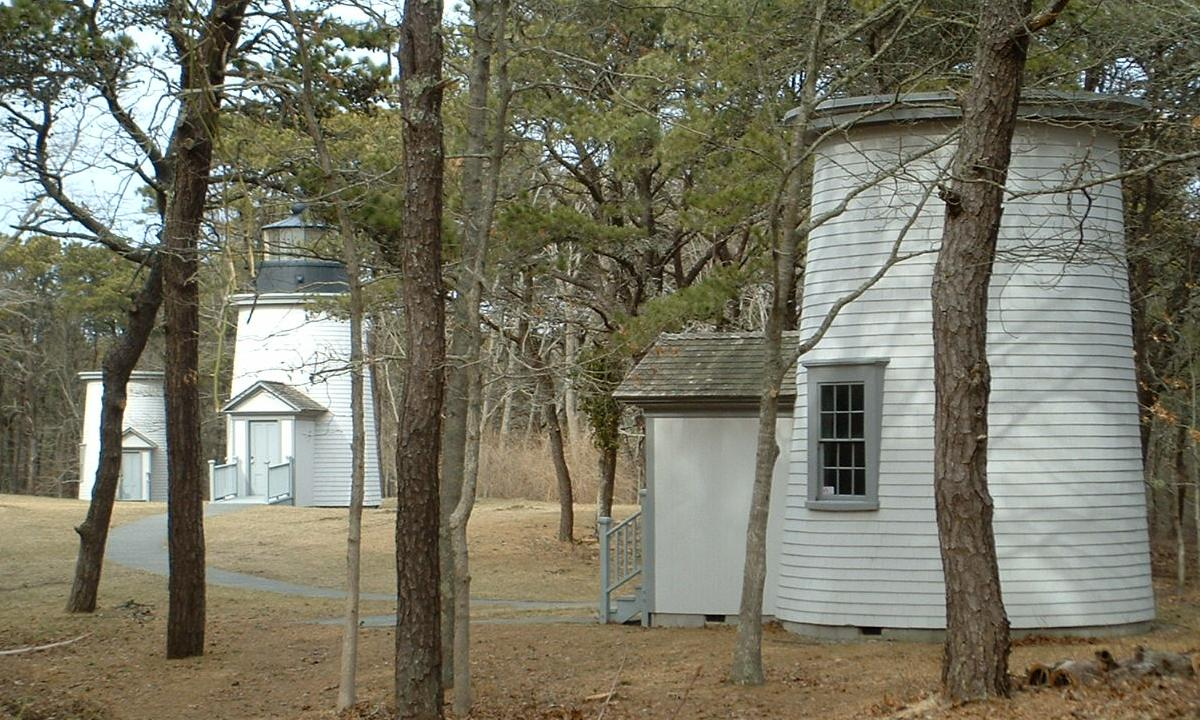
The Three Sisters Lights, North Eastham, 2005

Historical population
Year	Pop.	±%
1790	1,834	—
1850	845	−53.9%
1860	779	−7.8%
1870	668	−14.2%
1880	692	+3.6%
1890	602	−13.0%
1900	502	−16.6%
1910	518	+3.2%
1920	430	−17.0%
1930	543	+26.3%
1940	582	+7.2%
1950	860	+47.8%
1960	1,200	+39.5%
1970	2,043	+70.2%
1980	3,472	+69.9%
1990	4,462	+28.5%
2000	5,453	+22.2%
2010	4,956	−9.1%
2020	5,752	+16.1%
2023*	5,803	+0.9%
* = population estimate. Source: United States census records and Population Estimates Program data.

As of the census of 2010, there were 4,956 people, 2,396 households, and 1,634 families residing in the town. The population density was 390 inhabitants per square mile (150/km^{2}). There were 5,535 housing units at an average density of 396 per square mile (153/km^{2}). The racial makeup of the town was 96.31% White, 1.49% African American, 0.15% Native American, 0.31% Asian, 0.04% Pacific Islander, 0.29% from other races, and 1.41% from two or more races. Hispanic or Latino of any race were 0.83% of the population.

There were 2,396 households, out of which 21.9% had children under the age of 18 living with them, 55.0% were married couples living together, 9.9% had a female householder with no husband present, and 31.8% were non-families. 25.5% of all households were made up of individuals, and 12.4% had someone living alone who was 65 years of age or older. The average household size was 2.24 and the average family size was 2.66.

In the town, the population was spread out, with 17.7% under the age of 18, 5.0% from 18 to 24, 23.7% from 25 to 44, 27.6% from 45 to 64, and 26.0% who were 65 years of age or older. The median age was 48 years. For every 100 females, there were 93.6 males. For every 100 females age 18 and over, there were 89.0 males.

The median income for a household in the town was $42,618, and the median income for a family was $51,269. Males had a median income of $36,642 versus $32,109 for females. The per capita income for the town was $24,642. About 4.5% of families and 7.0% of the population were below the poverty line, including 6.5% of those under age 18 and 7.3% of those age 65 or over.

== Government ==
Eastham is represented in the Massachusetts House of Representatives as a part of the Fourth Barnstable district, which includes (with the exception of Brewster) all the towns east and north of Harwich on the Cape. The town is represented in the Massachusetts Senate as a part of the Cape and Islands District, which includes all of Cape Cod, Martha's Vineyard and Nantucket except the towns of Bourne, Falmouth, Sandwich and a portion of Barnstable. The town is patrolled by the Second (Yarmouth) Barracks of Troop D of the Massachusetts State Police.

On the national level, Eastham is a part of Massachusetts's 9th congressional district, and is currently represented by William Keating. The state's senior member of the United States Senate, elected in 2012, is Elizabeth Warren. The junior senator, elected in 2013, is Ed Markey.

Eastham is governed by the open town meeting form of government, and is led by a town administrator and a board of selectmen. The town hall, police and fire department headquarters are all located along Route 6 across from Windmill Park. The Eastham Public Library is located just west of the park, along Samoset Road (which leads from Route 6 to First Encounter Beach). There are separate post offices for Eastham and the village of North Eastham, both of which are located along Route 6 (the former being just across from the town hall, south of the park).

== Education ==
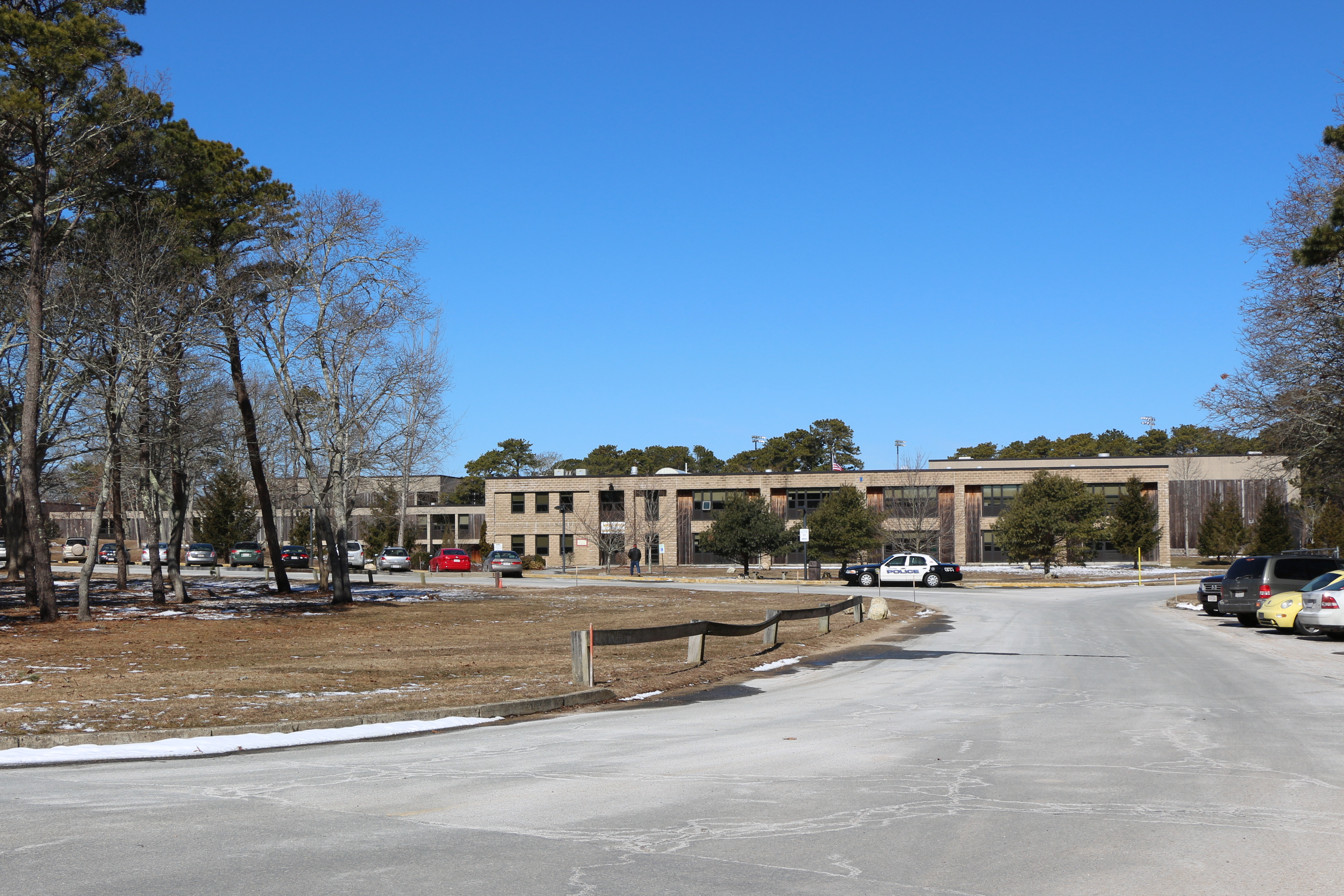
Nauset Regional High School

Eastham, along with Brewster, Orleans, Provincetown, Truro and Wellfleet, make up the Nauset Regional School District. Each town is responsible for operating its own elementary schools, with the middle and high school students attending regional schools. Eastham Elementary School serves students from kindergarten through fifth grade, and is located near the CCNS Visitor Center and the Schoolhouse Museum. Middle school students attend the Nauset Regional Middle School in Orleans, and the Nauset Regional High School is located in North Eastham, on the edge of the Cape Cod National Seashore. The school's teams are known as the Warriors, and their colors are black and gold. High school students also have the option of attending Cape Cod Regional Technical High School in Harwich free of charge. There are no private schools in Eastham; the nearest are in Brewster.

== Landmarks ==
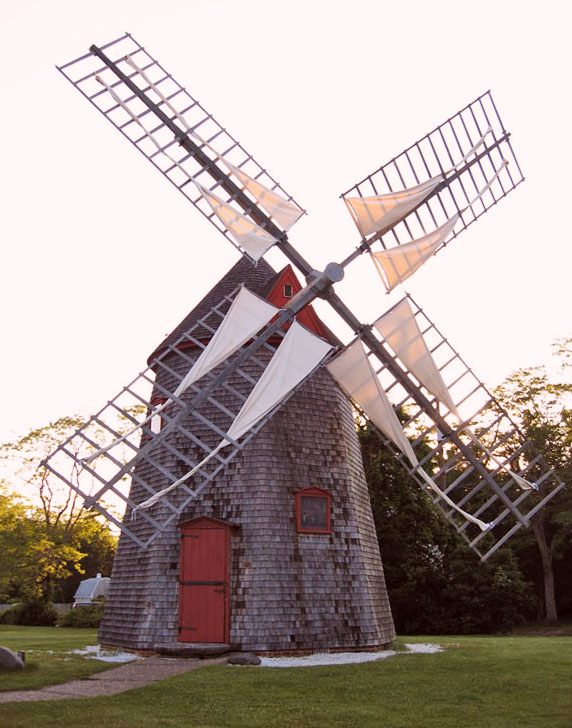
The Eastham Windmill 2006

Eastham is home to a number of sites that are listed on the National Register of Historic Places. The Eastham Center Historic District, located near Town Hall, is the site of the Eastham Windmill, the oldest windmill on Cape Cod. Another registered historic place, Nauset Light, is located on the grounds of the Cape Cod National Seashore. The Edward Penniman House and barn, a retired whaling captain's home, is located near Fort Hill.

Eastham is the home to four museums maintained by the Eastham Historical Society: the 1869 Schoolhouse Museum, located on Route 6 opposite the National Seashore Center, the 1741 Swift-Daley House, the Antique Tool Museum and the Dill Beach Shack, all on Route 6 adjacent to the Eastham Post Office. The museums are open in July and August.

== See also ==
- National Register of Historic Places listings in Barnstable County, Massachusetts
