= Long Point (Cape Cod) =

Extreme tip of Cape Cod, Massachusetts and former human settlement

- Village
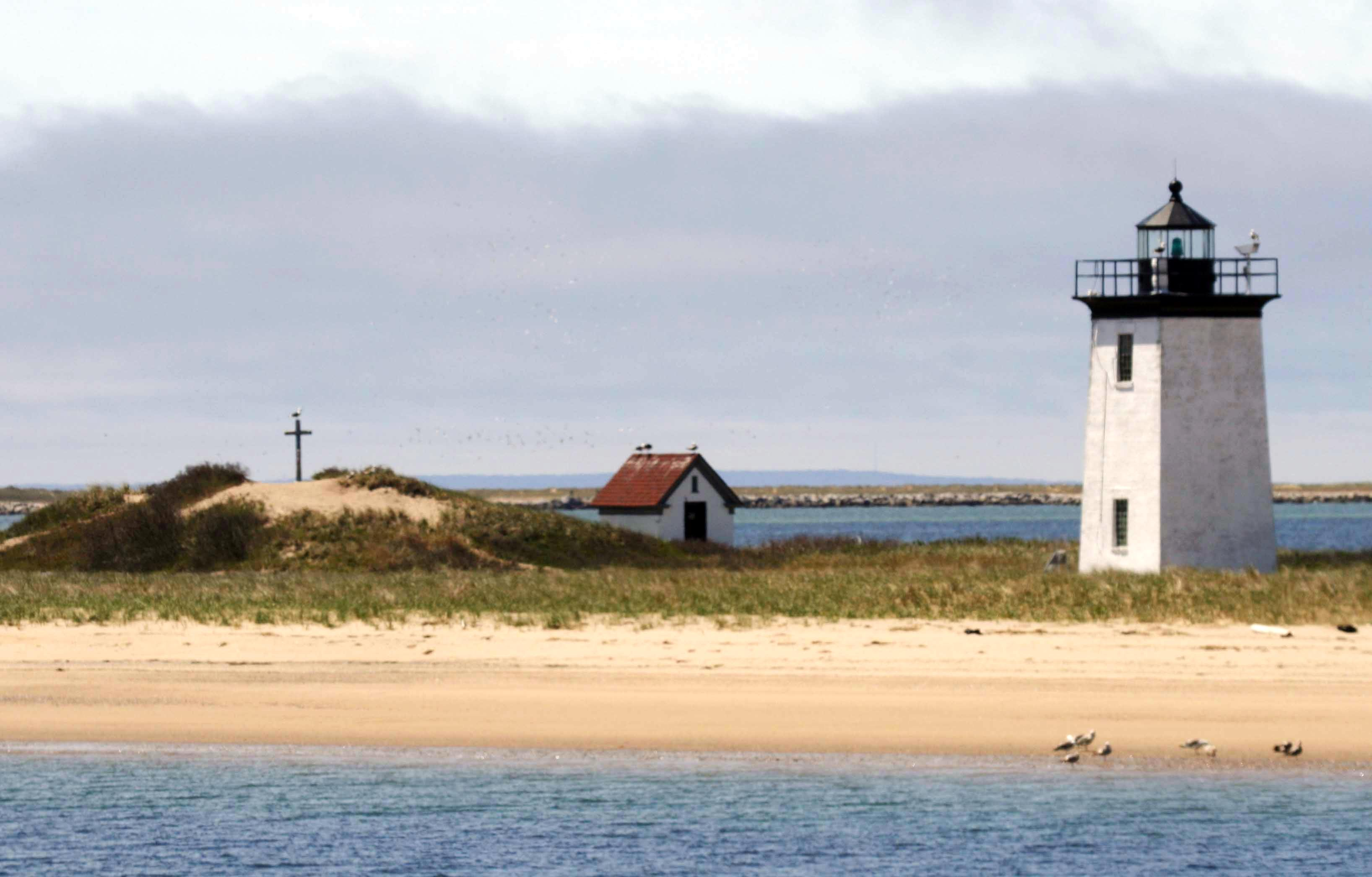
- Long Point Light and remains of a Civil War artillery battery. Also shown is the Darby cross erected by the Beachcombers club.

- Long Point, the tip of Cape Cod, Massachusetts
- Coordinates: 42.027°N 70.172°W
- Country: United States
- State: Massachusetts
- County: Barnstable
- Town: Provincetown
- Village settled: 1818
- Lighthouse built: 1827
- Village disbanded: circa 1857–1863
- Battery built: 1863
- Battery abandoned: 1872

Area (roughly 150 acres)
  - Total: 0.23 sq mi (0.6 km^{2})
- Highest elevation: 24 ft (7.3 m)
- Lowest elevation: 0 ft (0 m)

Population (1850)
  - Total: 260
  - Density: 1,100/sq mi (430/km^{2})
  - Current pop.: 0
- Time zone: UTC-5 (Eastern (EST))
  - Summer (DST): UTC-4 (E. Daylight (EDT))
- GNIS feature ID: 616615

Long Point is a spit of land located in Provincetown, Massachusetts, at the extreme tip of Cape Cod, where the peninsula curls back in on itself to form Provincetown Harbor. The Long Point Light was built on this point in 1827. This lighthouse was adjacent to a fishing community that came to be known as Long Point, Massachusetts. This Provincetown village grew and thrived from 1818 until the late 1850s. When the settlers decided to leave Long Point, they took most of their houses with them – about 30 structures in all – by floating them across the harbor.

During the Civil War, the military established a defensive coastal artillery post and garrison at this location. The Long Point Battery came to be known among the local residents as "Fort Useless" and "Fort Ridiculous".

Today, nothing remains of the village of Long Point, except for the lighthouse and an earthen mound, the last remnant of the military post.

== Early history ==
A fisherman named John Atwood built the first house on Long Point in 1818. He was followed by Prince Freeman, and next by Eldridge Smith. Others soon followed in increasing numbers, and in 1822, Prince Freeman Jr. became the first child born on "The Point", as it was called by the locals.

The initial lure that attracted so many fishermen to this area was its proximity to prime fishing grounds, and the amount of fish that could be caught from the shore. Using sweep seines (that were hand-knit by their wives), fishermen caught an abundance of mackerel, shad and bass from shore. There are reports of up to seventy-five 200-pound (91 kg) barrels of white shad caught in one haul, fetching $16 per barrel – accounting for inflation, that single haul netted roughly $43,000 in today's dollars.

By an act of Congress on May 18, 1826, the government earmarked $2,500 (roughly $71,000 today) to acquire four acres at the extreme tip of the point, and to construct a lighthouse, which was completed in 1827. By 1830, the lighthouse became the site of Long Point's first school, starting with only three children. The Long Point community continued to grow, and by 1846, the Town of Provincetown voted to build a schoolhouse on Long Point. By then, the village was home to 38 fishing families, with nearly 200 adults and 60 children. In describing the experience of living on Long Point in the early 1800s, one author wrote:

It was an exciting neighborhood to live in. Children who might have been afraid of dogs elsewhere, here ran from the sharks.

— Josef Berger, Cape Cod Pilot (1937)

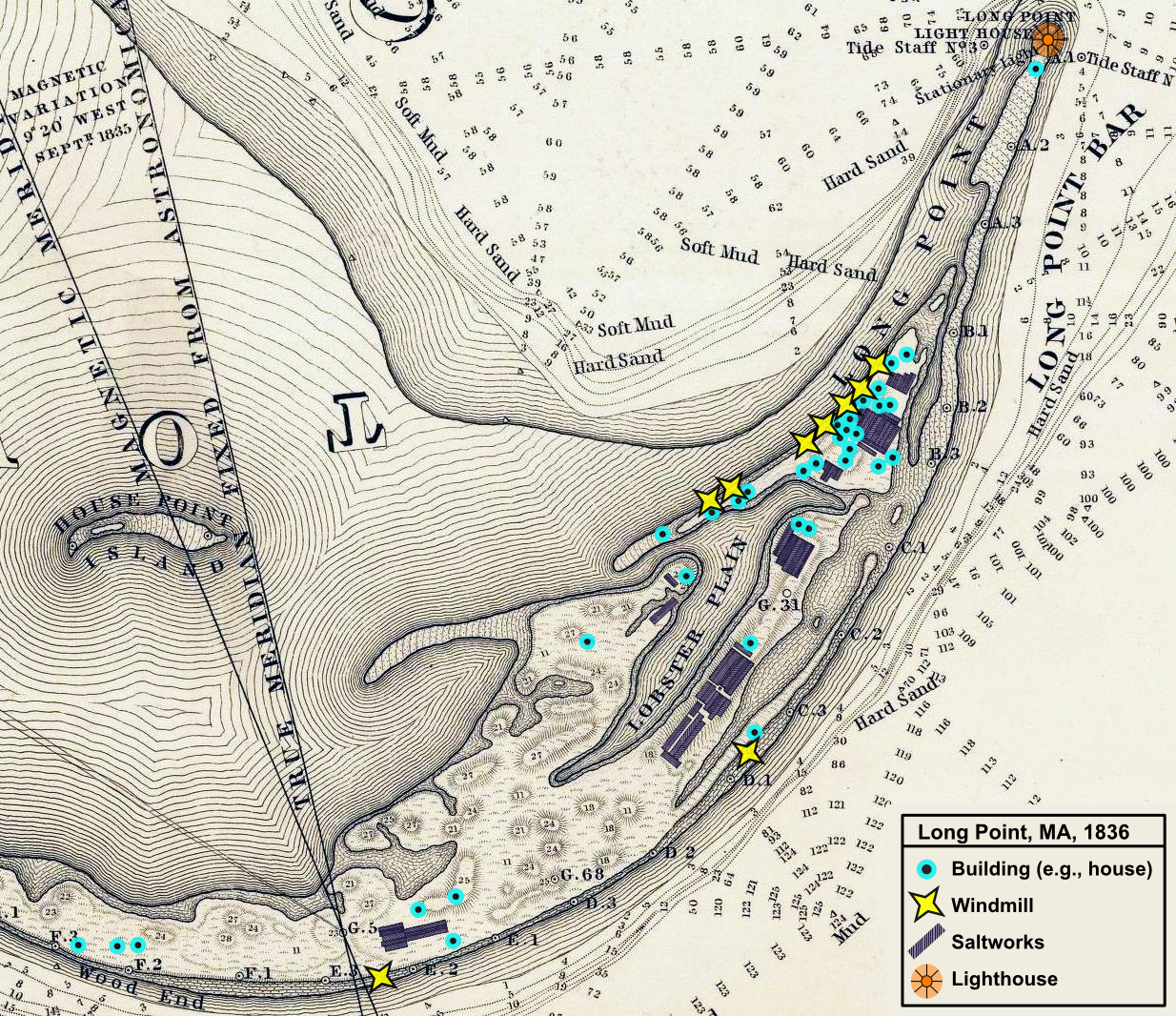
By 1836, Long Point had 34 buildings, plus 9 windmills powering several saltworks

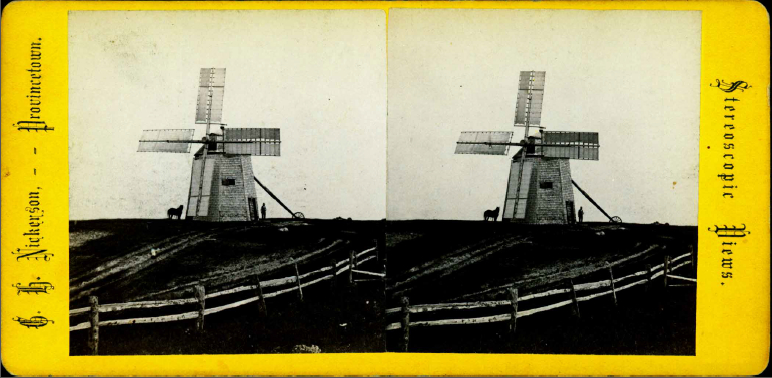
Stereoscopic view of a 19th-century windmill, just one of the dozens that once dotted Provincetown's shoreline

The village had its own post office, a bakery, boat landings for 20 cod-fishing vessels, breakwaters, and several saltworks with nine windmills that were used to pump seawater into about 7,000 or 8,000 feet (2,100 or 2,400 m) of drying pans. With low costs and an endless supply of raw materials, the collection of sea salt was extremely profitable in the first part of the 19th century. Not only was salt shipped out for domestic consumption, but it was also used to supply the fishing industry, which dried and salted the catch to preserve the fish for shipment. The annual output of the saltworks on Long Point reached "five to six hundred hogsheads", or 280,000–336,000 pounds (127–152 metric tons), "of extra quality salt." That represented just under 10% of Provincetown's total annual salt production of 3.4 million pounds (1,500 metric tons).

== Challenges ==
Production of salt did not retain its lucrative luster for long, however, for downward price pressures had hit that industry from several angles. For one, the completion of the Erie Canal in 1830 meant a sharp increase in competition from companies that were mining massive salt deposits in Syracuse, New York. Local competition had increased as well – by 1837, Provincetown had 78 saltworks, and the selling price had fallen from a high of eight dollars per bushel at the turn of the nineteenth century, down to only one dollar. Around that same time, demand for salt-cured fish began to decline, yielding to a growing consumer preference for ice harvesting and storage. John Atwood Jr., the son of Long Point's founder, boasted that "In 1848 I brought the first mackerel ever received on ice to Boston. It was August. I took them in the sloop smack American Eagle." He later pioneered the use of a jib topsail to shorten his time-to-market, so as to meet the growing appetite for fresh-caught fish.

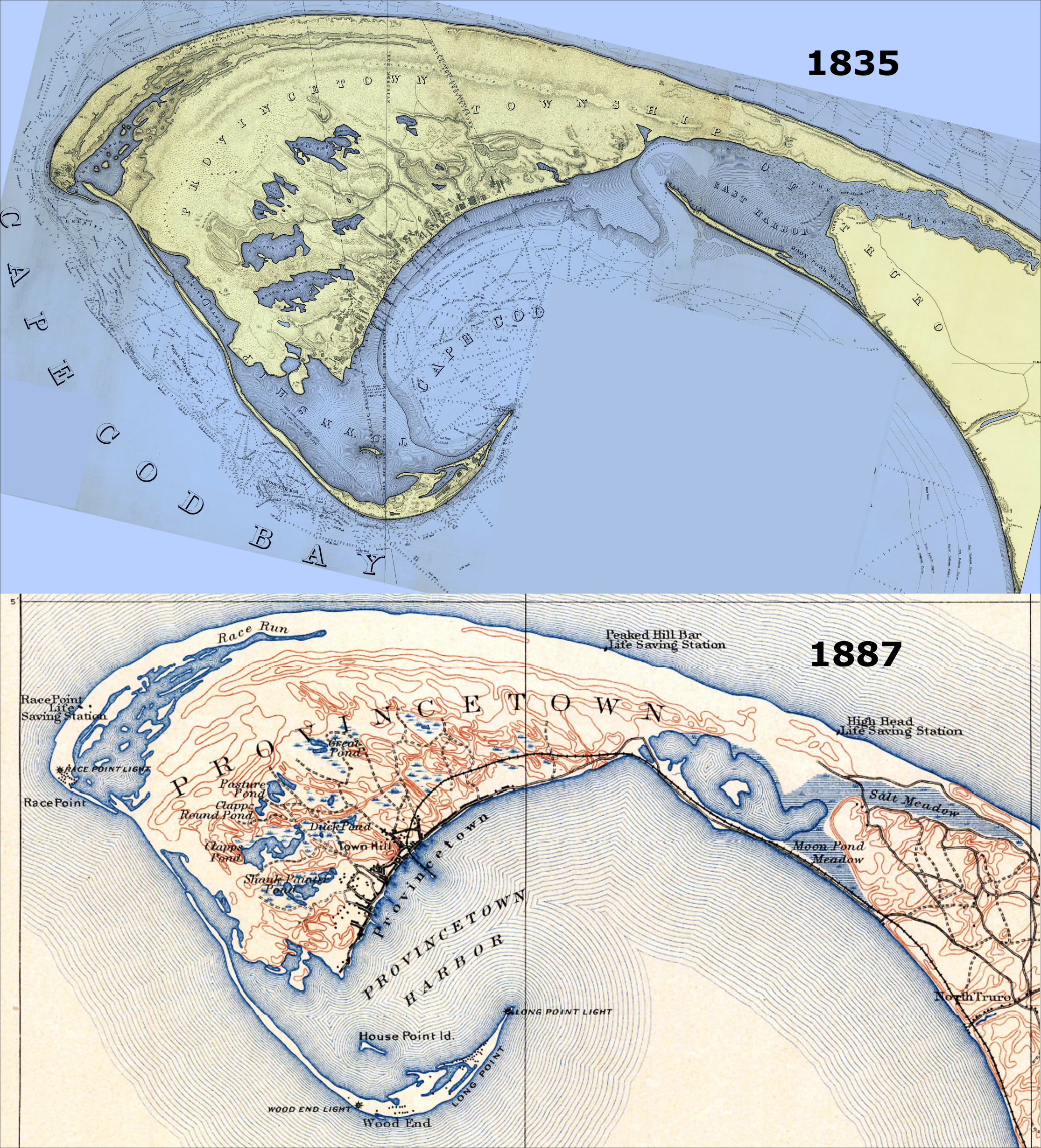
The East Harbor isolated Provincetown from other towns (top), until the railroad arrived in 1873

Living on Long Point presented its own share of challenges as well. The geography of Provincetown as a whole made for an isolating existence throughout most of its history, as the town was essentially cut off, not just from the mainland, but in many ways, even from neighboring towns on Cape Cod. The town was surrounded by water in every direction:

- Atlantic Ocean, to the north
- Massachusetts Bay to the northwest
- Cape Cod Bay to the west and southwest
- Provincetown Harbor to the south and southeast
- East Harbor and a salt marsh to the east

Until late in the 19th century, there was not a single road leading in or out of Provincetown – the only way to travel by land to the rest of Cape Cod was to first head north, traversing a series of tall, rolling sand dunes, and to then follow the thin strip of beach along the northern shore line, known as the "backshore". A wooden bridge was erected over the East Harbor in 1854, only to be destroyed by a winter storm and ice two years later. Although the bridge was replaced the following year, a traveler using it still had to traverse several miles over a sand route, which, together with the backshore route, would occasionally be washed out by storms. Prior to the railroad's arrival in 1873, Provincetown was like an island, in that it relied almost entirely upon the sea for its communication, travel, and commerce needs. All of this was doubly true of Long Point, being isolated from its own nearest neighbor, the rest of the town of Provincetown. To reach the closest edge of town from Long Point by land, one had to make a difficult trek across a 3-mile (4.8 km) beach route past Wood End to Herring Cove, and then another mile (1.6 km) over continuously shifting sand dunes. To complicate matters, portions of that route were underwater twice each day with the high tide.

Although salt was plentiful, there was no source of fresh water on Long Point. Plank cisterns were built throughout the village to collect and store rain water for daily use. During periods of drought, barrels of water had to be filled up in Provincetown, and then transported over to the point.

Beyond the challenges imposed by the occasional drought, however, the residents of Long Point came to recognize the potential for a much greater natural force – one that threatened to impact them with little advance warning. While Long Point provides a natural barrier to protect Provincetown and its harbor from many storm hazards, the point bears the brunt of such a storm when it does so:

This sickle of sand which encloses one of the finest harbors on the North Atlantic was so narrow that encroaching storms played havoc with it and threatened at one time to sweep the narrow point away. It was too valuable a harbor to be destroyed and the government took it over.

— Mary Heaton Vorse, Time and the town: a Provincetown chronicle (1942)

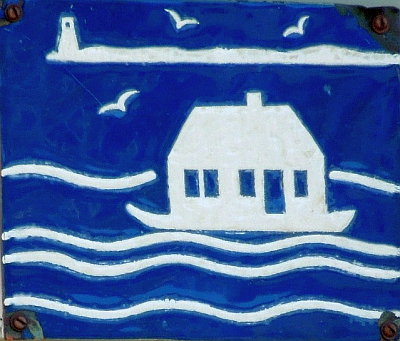
Plaque that identifies "floater houses", those that were floated across the harbor

== Moving ==
Sources differ and remain unclear as to the specific reasons for leaving Long Point; it is also unclear whether there was a triggering event which caused a wholesale departure, or whether there was instead a more orderly migration. Sources all agree, however, that beginning in the 1850s, families began to leave Long Point and return to the main town. Most of the families took their houses with them when they left Long Point – the local Deacon's specialty was moving buildings, and the houses, about 30 in all, were placed on rafts and floated across Provincetown Harbor to the town's West End. "They say that so gently were these houses eased off that the moving didn't interfere with the housewife cooking her dinner," wrote Mary Heaton Vorse. By the time of the American Civil War (1861–1865), only two houses were left on Long Point.

A 1942 article in the Cape Cod Standard Times tells the following variation of the story:

Perhaps the inhabitants grew tired of sharks sunning themselves on their front lawns, perhaps sea creatures carried off their pet dogs and cats; whatever the reason the citizens of Long Point scheduled a colossal moving day. The women packed the household possessions in dories, while the men floated the houses and public buildings across a mile of water on casks. And that was the end of the community of Long Point.

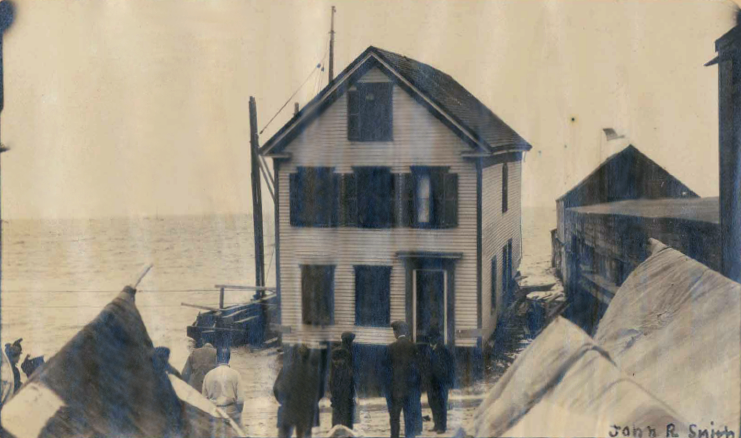
This house floated from Long Point to the West End in the 1850s; shown here in 1890 moving yet again, to the East End.

Many of those historic "floater homes", as they came to be called, are still standing in Provincetown's West End, and can be identified by a distinctive blue and white plaque that indicates the home's historic journey. The schoolhouse was among the last buildings to leave Long Point; it was moved to Commercial Street in the center of town.

== Long Point Battery ==
During the War of 1812, the British navy had controlled Provincetown Harbor. Seeking to correct the lack of fortifications, the U.S. Army surveyed the harbor from 1833 to 1835, and noted that "the point had a large civilian population". The Army returned to build the planned Long Point Battery during the American Civil War. Army documents state that:

the point ... was deserted by the time construction of two earthwork [artillery] batteries began in early 1863. Construction was completed in December of 1863. The outer battery consisted of three 32-pound [15 kg] guns and a built-in powder magazine. The inner battery, connected to the outer battery by a 1,650-foot [500 m] wooden walkway, consisted of six 32-pound [15 kg] guns and two built-in magazines. A barracks for quartering a company of soldiers, an officer's quarters, and stables were constructed south of the inner battery.

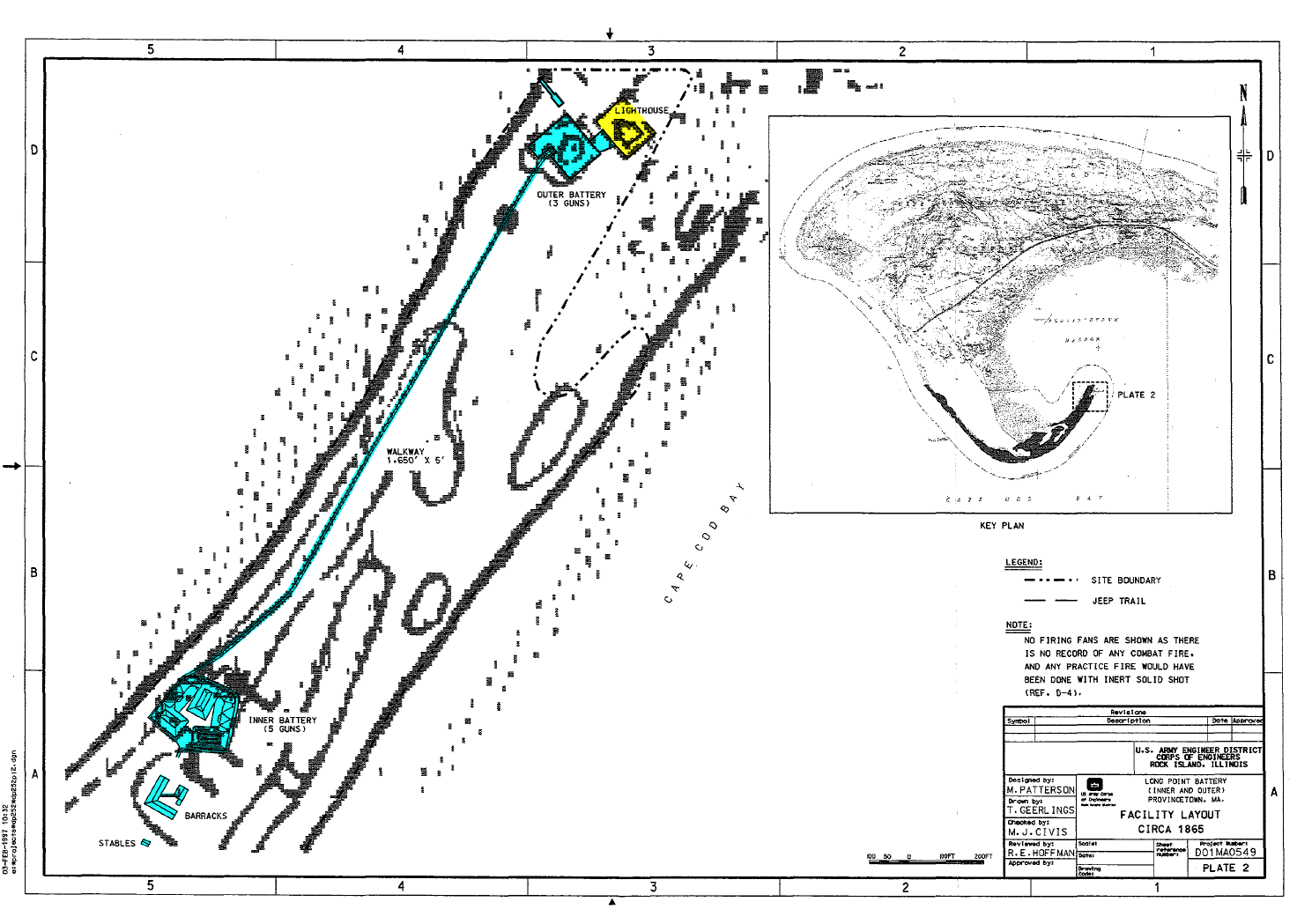
Long Point Battery, circa 1865. US Army Corps of Engineers.

The batteries were designed by and built under the supervision of Major Charles E. Blunt of the United States Army Corps of Engineers. The Army, however, did not actually "construct" the officer's quarters – instead, the company's three officers were headquartered in the last remaining house from the earlier village. On March 5, 1864, the Commonwealth of Massachusetts ceded "an indefinite area (approximately 150 acres)" of Long Point to the United States Government. The new barracks housed a company of 98 enlisted soldiers from the Unattached Companies of Massachusetts Volunteer Militia. The 12th Unattached Company, which had been detached from an existing regiment of the Massachusetts Militia, at first served a 90-day tour of duty at the post from May through August 1864. Most of the men reenlisted for another 100-day tour, this time as the 21st Unattached Company from August through November. In November 1864, they enlisted once again for a full year, but they were mustered out at the end of June 1865, as the war had come to an end. The enlisted barracks was floated across the harbor postwar, and still exists as 473 Commercial Street in Provincetown.

The batteries on Long Point remained operational until the post was abandoned in 1872, but they were never used in combat. In the years following the war, the people of Provincetown, aware that they were protected against an enemy that would never materialize, soon labelled the batteries "Fort Useless" and "Fort Ridiculous". The earthworks of the batteries remain, eroded down to sand dunes.

== Late 19th century to present ==
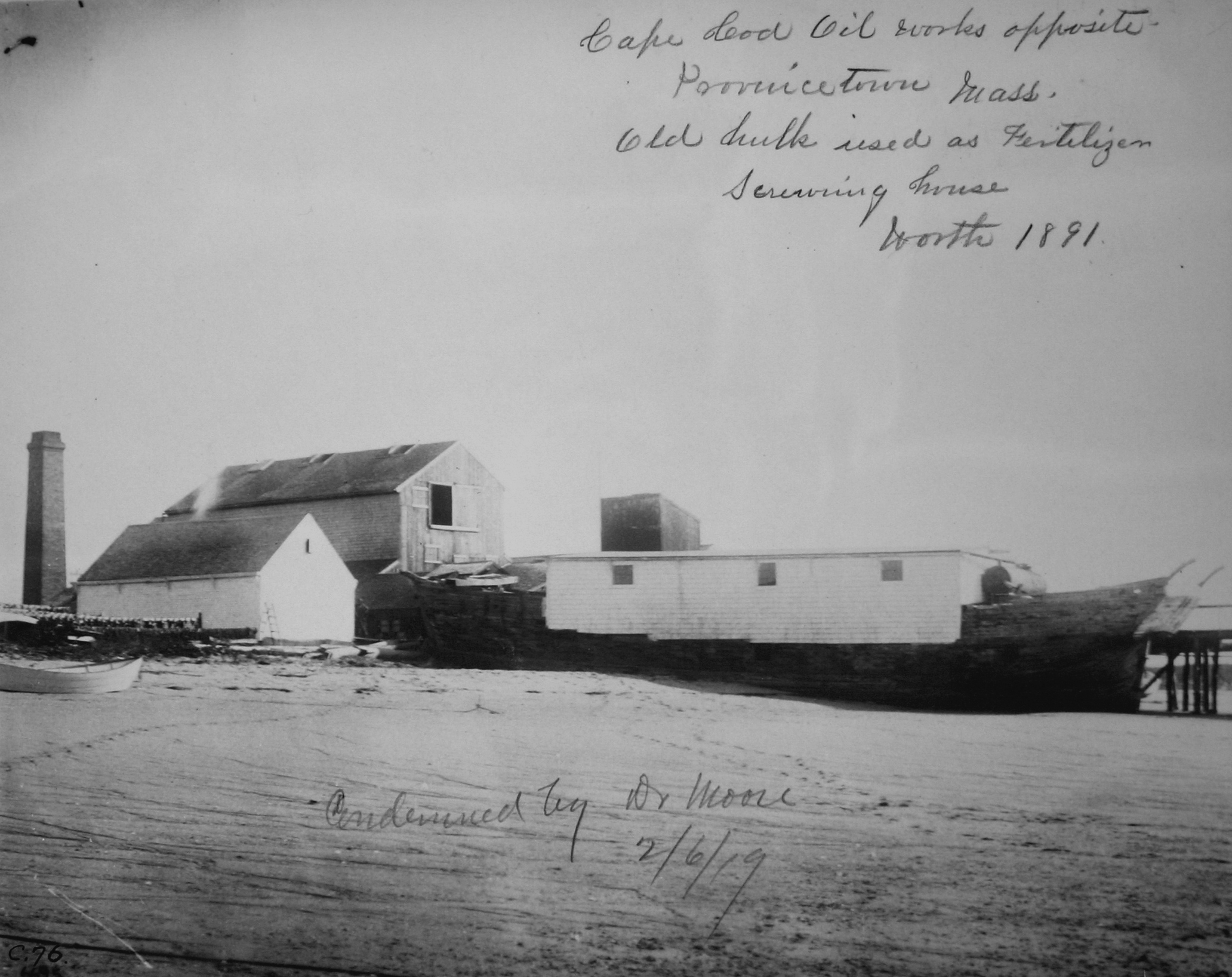
Cape Cod Oil Works, 1891. An old ship hull was the fertilizer screening room.

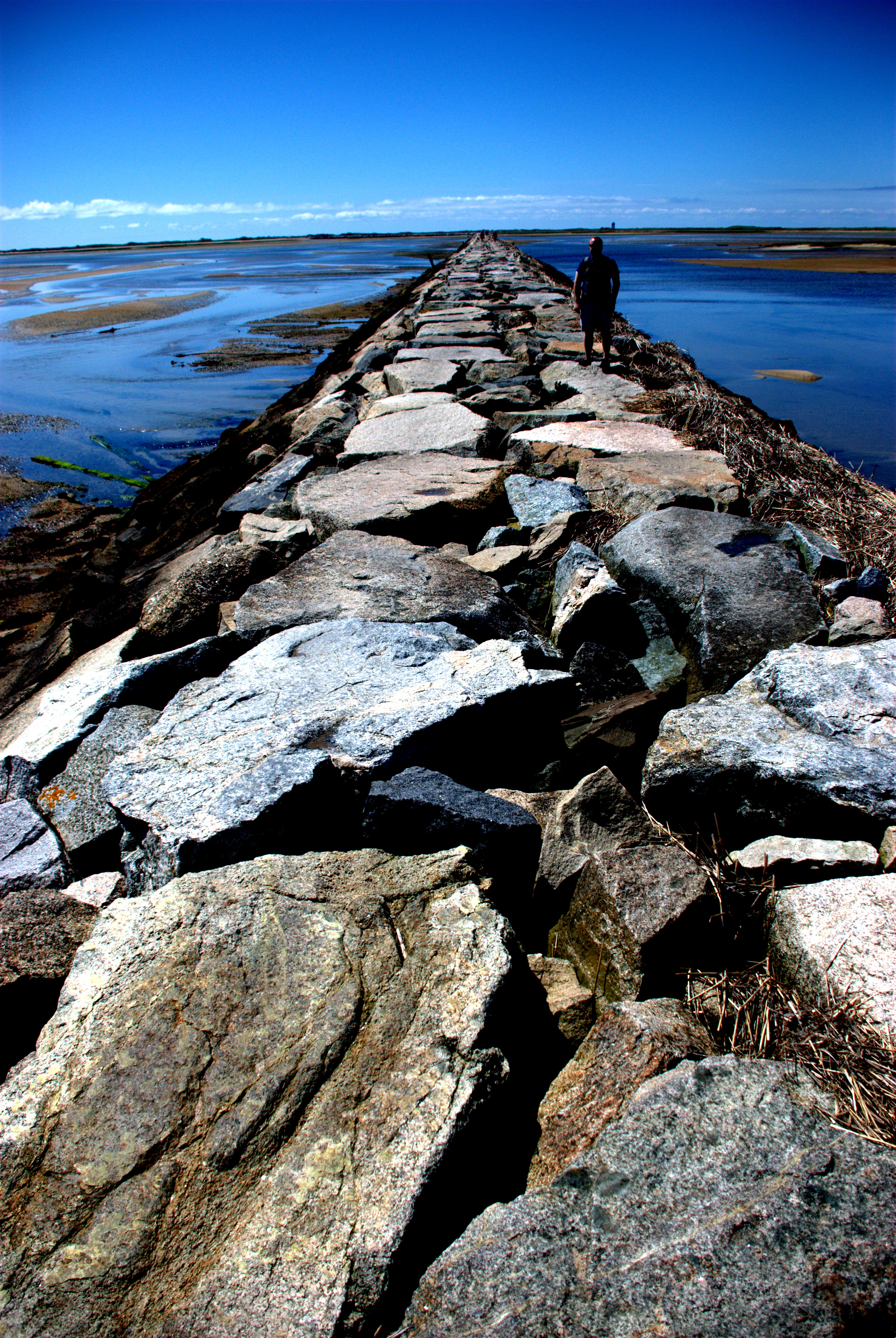
The Long Point Dike, a permeable breakwater, built in 1911. Wood End Light on horizon (above man's head); Long Point Light is 1.5 miles (2.4 km) to the left (not shown)

In 1873, a lighthouse inspection revealed that the original wooden light – whose unique architectural design came to be known as a "Cape Cod style lighthouse" – had deteriorated to such a poor condition that it might be destroyed by a strong storm. In 1875, that light was replaced with the brick tower that stands today.

Even though the Army had moved out, they retained title to the land. Nevertheless, at around the same time that the lighthouse was rebuilt, the Cape Cod Oil Works built a cod fish oil and whale oil factory in the area that had been the barracks. As the land was still a military reservation, the Army tried to have the factory removed a number of times in the ensuing years. Records from this period are scarce, but Army archives indicate that the factory was still operating in the middle of 1883 – another source from 1890 states that "John Atwood built a wharf on the north side of the point, which is standing to-day, used by the Cape Cod Oil Works, the only buildings now left excepting the lighthouse." The exact date of the factory's closing is unknown, but official Army correspondence in 1917 makes no mention of it. The only known photograph of the factory, taken in 1891 and retrieved from the National Archives and Records Administration is inscribed with the words "Condemned ... 1919".

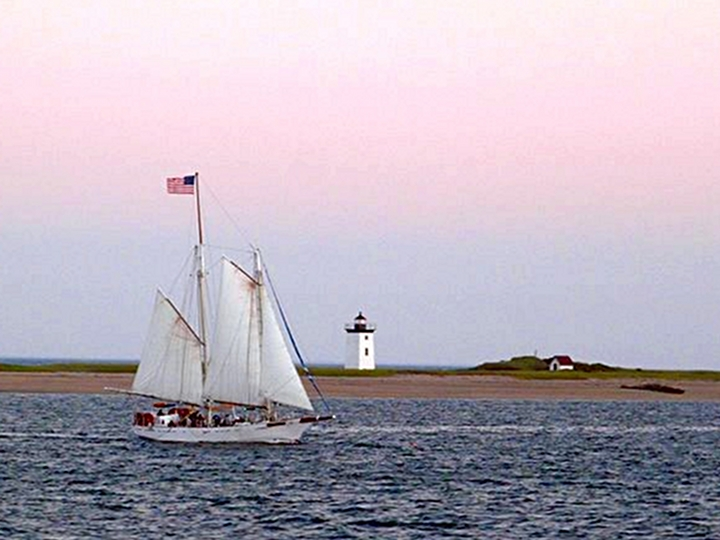
Long Point, as viewed from downtown, 2012

An oil house was built in 1904, in order to properly store the flammable materials used to illuminate the light. Aside from the lighthouse and the oil house, no other structure has survived to the present day. The mound of earth that formed the foundation of the outer battery appears as none other than a sand dune – no other hint of the early settlement, the military post, nor the oil factory can be found on Long Point today.

One cultural artifact that is now visible atop the earthworks of the outer battery is a cross that honors the memory of Staff Sgt. Charles Darby – "an unsung soldier who loved the dunes". Darby was killed in action over the Netherlands in 1944.

== Village detail, 1857 ==
The image below shows the layout of the houses, stores and saltworks on Long Point as they existed in 1857. Clicking the image will lead not only to a larger image, but also to a legend key to the numbers. That list, which includes the names of each home/store owner, gives one a good sense of the extent of the community at that time.

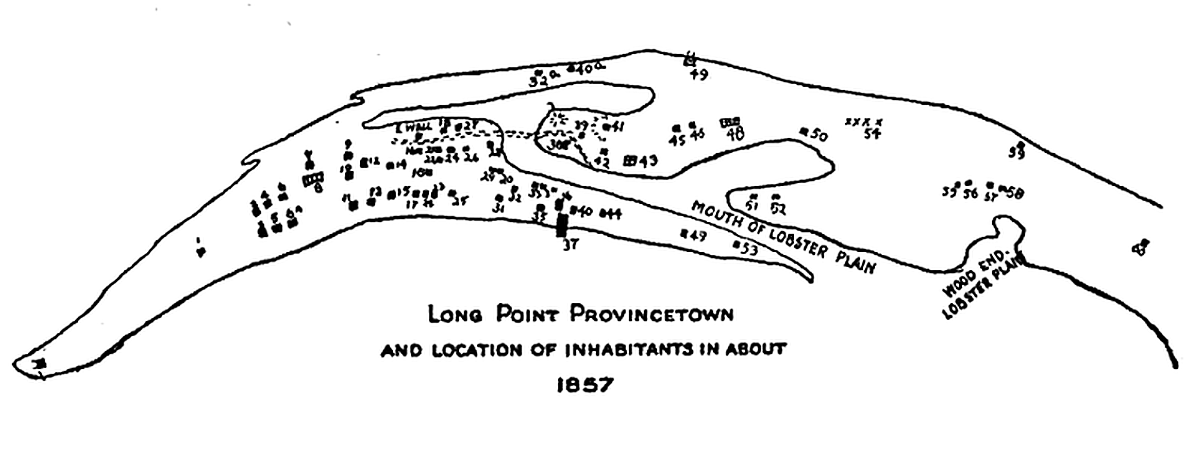
The layout of Long Point in 1857. Click the image for larger view, plus a detailed key to the numbers.

== Gallery ==
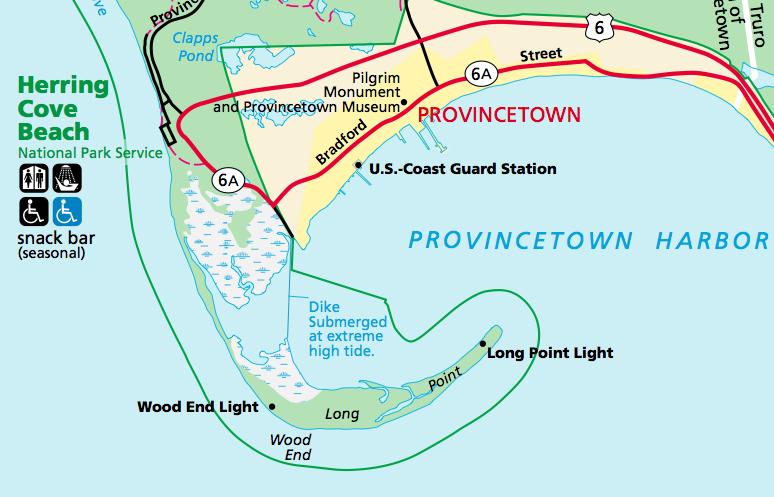
Present-day map of Long Point, from the National Park Service.

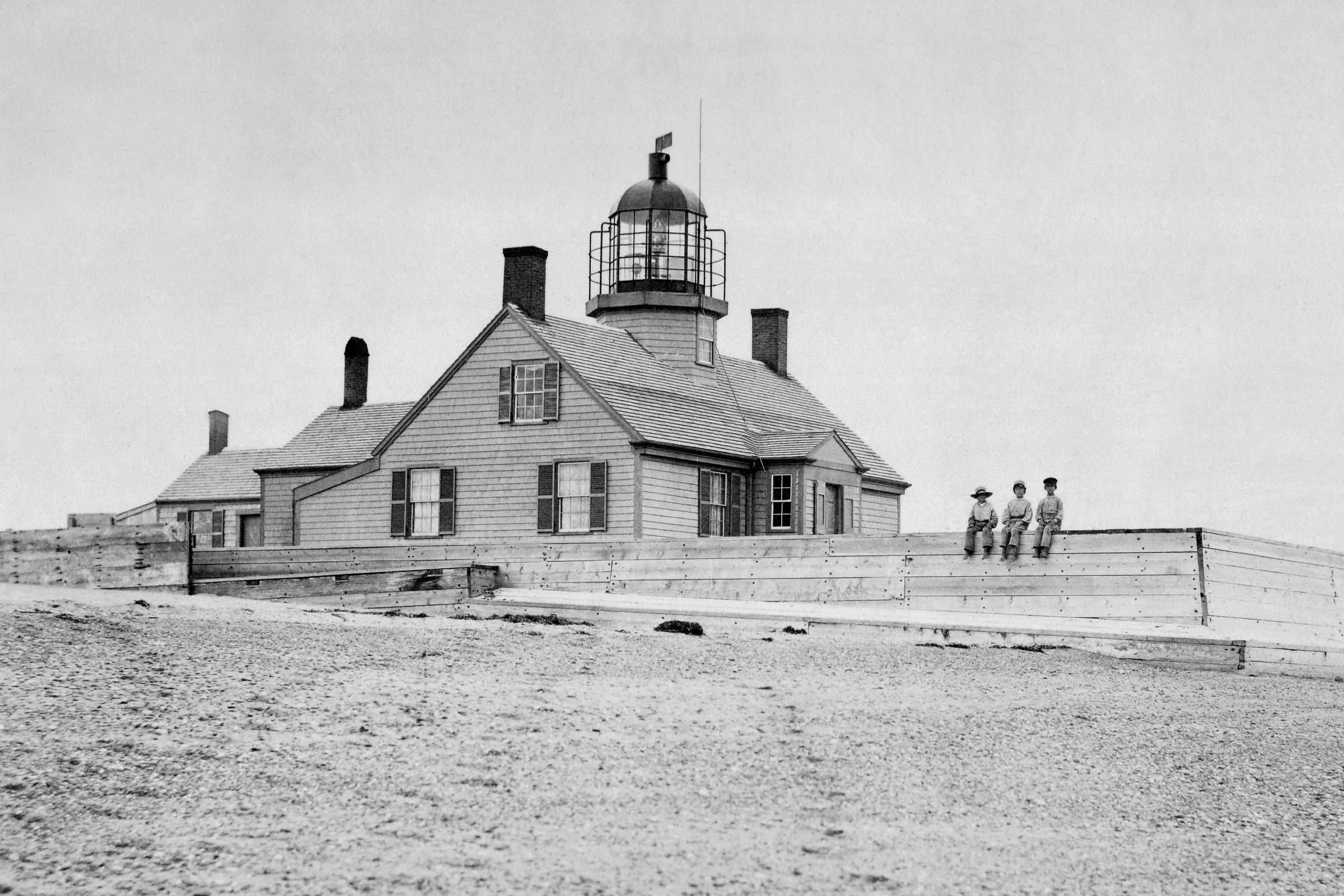
The original lighthouse and keeper's house. Note the three small children seated in front.

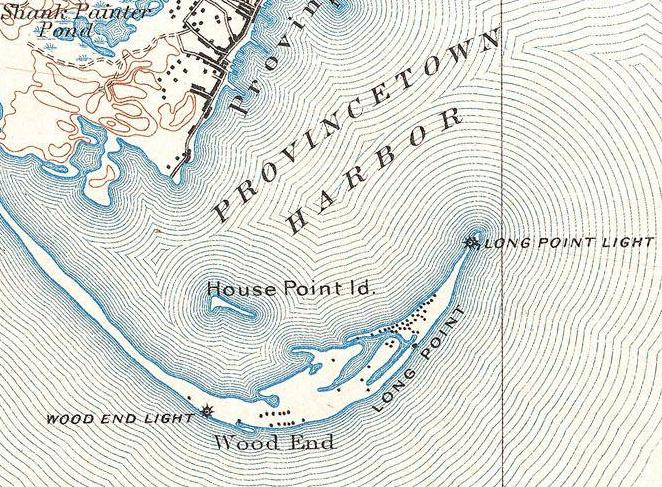
1889 map shows buildings at Long Point and Wood End, despite being replaced by Long Point Battery in 1864.

== See also ==
- List of military installations in Massachusetts
