= Alcatraz Island Lighthouse =

Lighthouse in the San Francisco Bay, California

Alcatraz Island Light
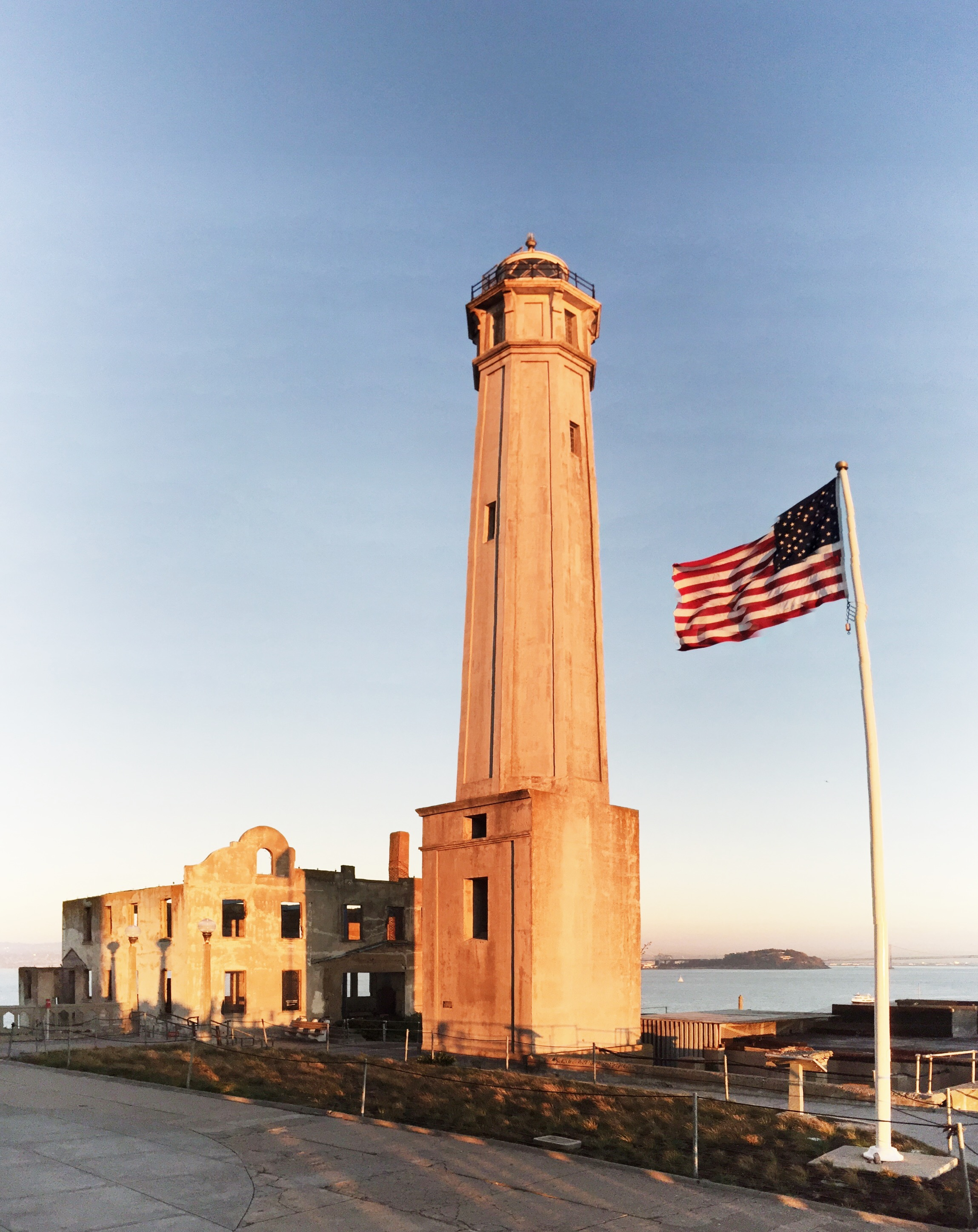
- Alcatraz Island Lighthouse
- Location: Alcatraz Island, San Francisco Bay, California, United States
- Coordinates: 37°49′34.5″N 122°25′19.8″W

Tower
- Constructed: 1854 (first)
- Foundation: Masonry basement
- Construction: Reinforced concrete
- Automated: 1963
- Height: 84 feet (26 m)
- Shape: Tapered octagonal tower with balcony and lantern
- Markings: Unpainted tower, black lantern
- Operator: Golden Gate National Recreation Area
- Heritage: National Register of Historic Places contributing property

Light
- First lit: 1909 (current)
- Focal height: 214 feet (65 m)
- Lens: Third order Fresnel lens (removed), DCB-24 aerobeacon (current)
- Range: 22 nautical miles (41 km; 25 mi)
- Characteristic: Fl W 5s.
- Alcatraz Island Lighthouse
- U.S. Historic district – Contributing property
- Part of: Alcatraz (ID76000209)
- Designated CP: June 23, 1976

Alcatraz Island Lighthouse is a lighthouse—the first one built on the U.S. West Coast—located on Alcatraz Island in California's San Francisco Bay. It is located at the southern end of the island near the entrance to the prison. The first light house on the island was completed in 1854, and served the bay during its time as a Citadel and military prison. It was replaced by a taller (95 feet (29 m) above mean sea level) concrete tower built in 1909 to the south of the original one which was demolished after it was damaged due to earthquake in 1906. The automation of the lighthouse with a modern beacon took place in 1963, the year Alcatraz closed as the Alcatraz Federal Penitentiary. It is the oldest light station on the island with a modern beacon and is part of the museum on the island. Although when viewed from afar it easily looks the tallest structure on Alcatraz, it is actually shorter than the Alcatraz Water Tower, but as it lies on higher ground it looks much taller.

== History ==
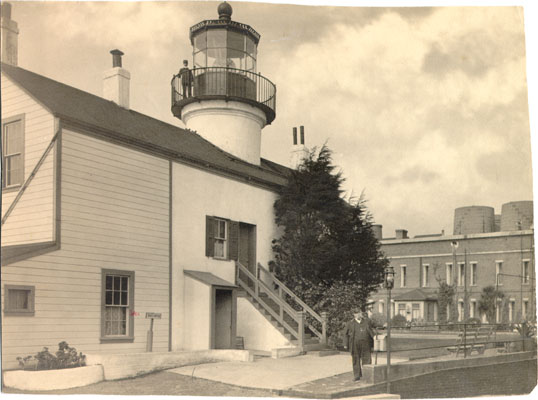
Original lighthouse

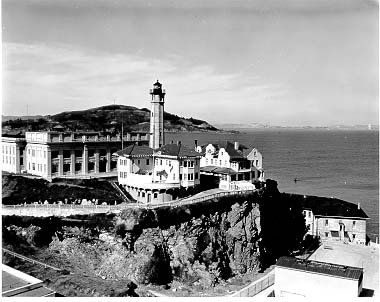
Alcatraz Lighthouse, 1909, U.S. Coast Guard Archive

Even though the Native Indians of the San Francisco area are stated to be the original settlers on the island (they collected eggs from the large flock of birds that regularly gathered there), Alcatraz got its name during Spanish rule in 1775 when naval officer and explorer Juan de Ayala surveyed the harbor and the San Francisco Bay. Since he observed pelicans in large numbers on the island he named the island as "Isla de los Alcatraces" meaning the "Island of Pelicans". The island is separated from the main land by more than 1 mile (1.6 km).

The gold rush and the inherent risk of the choppy waters of the west coast prompted the urgent need for establishing lighthouses. Congress recognized the need and passed suitable acts in the years 1851 and 1852 to build seven lighthouses on the West Coast to guide navigation. The Baltimore firm of Gibbons and Kelly was awarded the contract to build seven lighthouses in California, at Alcatraz Island, Fort Point, Point Pinos, Point Loma, Farallon Island, and Humboldt Bay, and one at Cape Disappointment in Washington state. Equipment were shipped on Oriole, reached San Francisco on January 29, 1853. The Alcatraz Lighthouse was the first to be completed in July 1853, making it the oldest major navigational light on the West Coast. However, the foundation for building the light house had begun much before the equipment reached San Francisco.

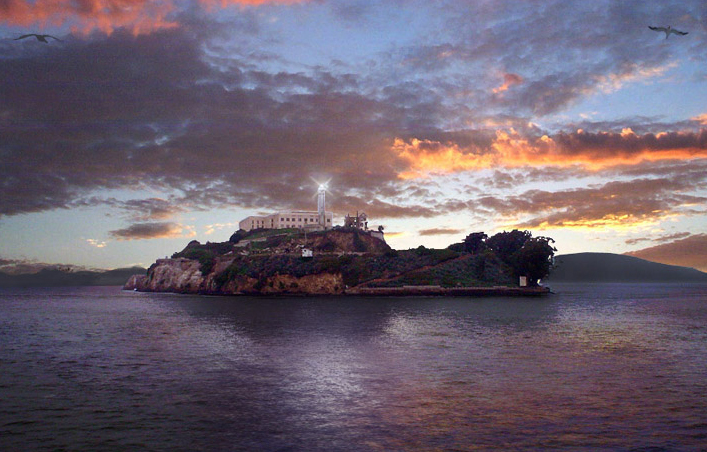
Alcatraz Light at sunset

In the original order placed for supply of the equipment Argand lamps and parabolic reflectors had been specified as the Fresnel lens, created by Augustin Fresnel of France in 1822 was considered very costly at that time. However, the Lighthouse Board which replaced the Fifth Auditor of the Treasury's control, decided to install Fresnel lenses in all lighthouses considering its established better performance, even though the cost was high. The Baltimore firm was informed of this change before the equipment was shipped. The shipping involved a long sea voyage of 12,000 miles (19,000 km) from the East Coast going round the cape of South America. It was lit on June 1, 1854, from a fixed, third-order Fresnel lens. In 1902, it was transferred to the Cape St. Elias Lighthouse in Alaska and replaced by a revolving fourth-order Fresnel lens, producing a white flash every five seconds.

In 1909–12, the present cell house of Alcatraz was built. Since the new structure would interfere with the operation of the lighthouse, a taller 25.6 metres (84 ft), concrete tower was built south of the original lighthouse. The original lighthouse had been damaged during the great San Francisco earthquake of 1906 and was eventually torn down. In 1963, the Alcatraz Lighthouse was automated by the United States Coast Guard. In 1970 a fire destroyed the warden's house, the keepers' quarters and other buildings on the island. The only remaining building is the tall cement tower equipped with a modern beacon. The lighthouse has been a museum since 2000 and can be visited. In over 50 years, the lighthouse has not been seriously damaged despite many prison escapes, the Battle of Alcatraz and fires.

== Structural details ==
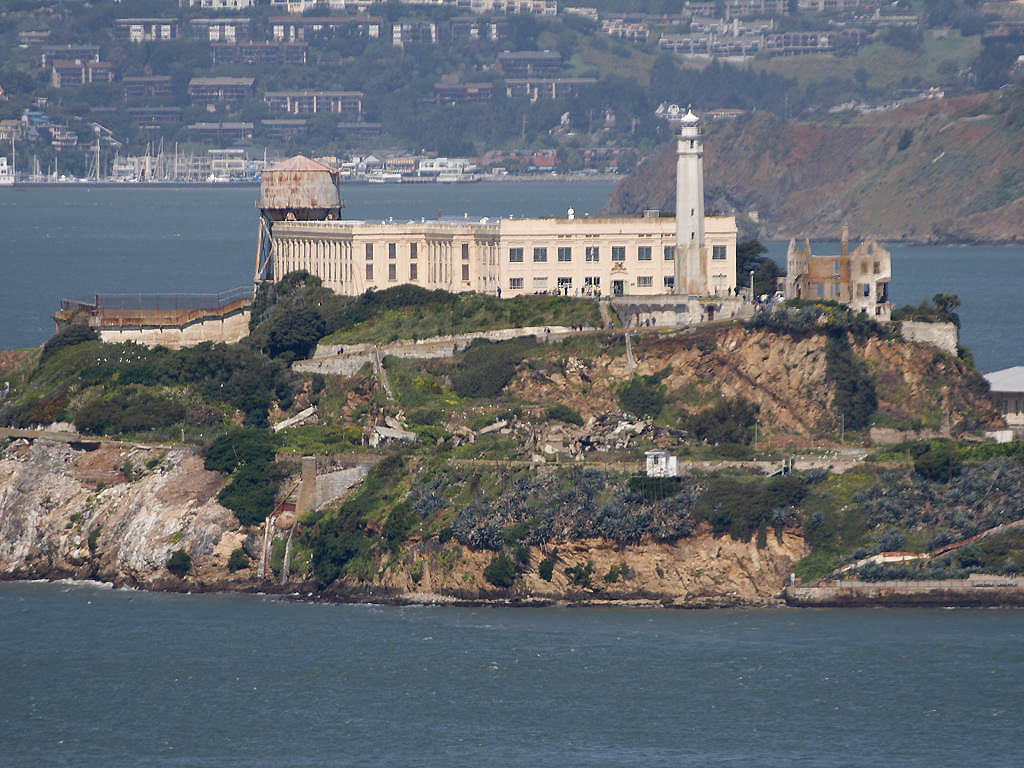

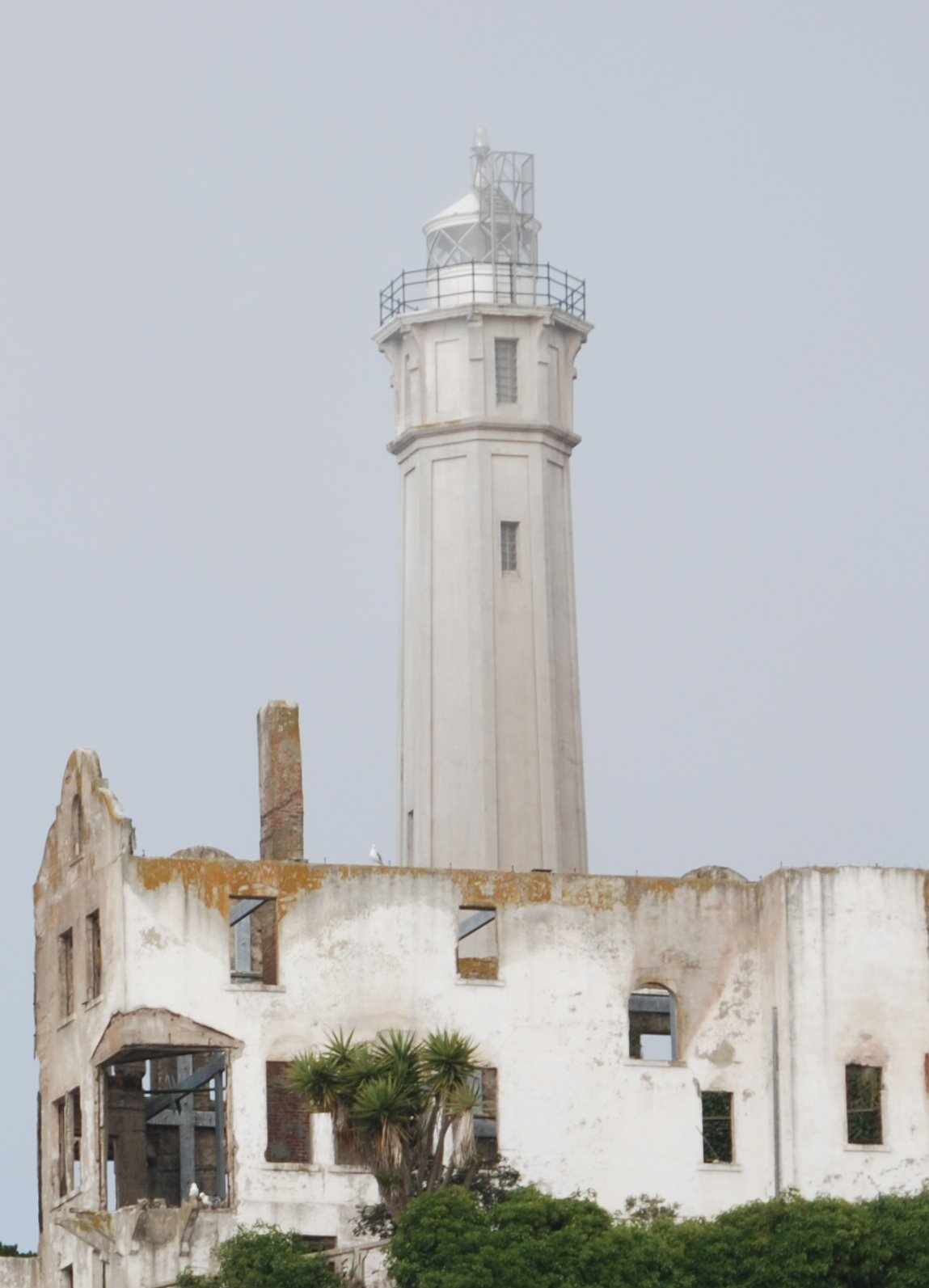
Alcatraz Lighthouse, 2007

The first lighthouse was 50 feet (15 m) in height, and was based on a design that was typical of early "Cape Cod style" lighthouses, in which the light tower was an integral part of the keeper's house, and was centered atop the dwelling's roof. Construction of the foundation started in 1852, and the one-and-a-half-storied keeper's house and light were completed in 1853. The lens arrived in October 1853 and Michael Cassin lit it on June 1, 1854, thus setting a "milestone" of sorts for this lighthouse, as the first lighthouse on the Pacific Coast. The old lighthouse was damaged in the earthquake which occurred on Wednesday the April 18, 1906. A new lighthouse was built to the south east of the old one. The old lighthouse existed alongside the new structure for a while and used as a storehouse, but was eventually demolished between 1912 and 1913.

The existing lighthouse is built to a height of 84 feet (26 m), 214 feet (65 m) above sea level, to the south of the original lighthouse. Its foundation is made of masonry while the octagonal pyramidal shaped tower is made of concrete. Initially, a third order Fresnel reflector was installed in 1854, and was replaced by a fourth order reflector in 1903. The foghorn bell was replaced by electronic Klaxon. Near the base of the tower was family accommodation also built to house three keepers and their families. Similar "Cape-cod style" lighthouses, encircling the thick light brick tower, were built at Point Loma in San Diego, Point Pinos near Monterey and also on the Southeast Farallon Island about 30 miles (48 km) west of the San Francisco Strait.

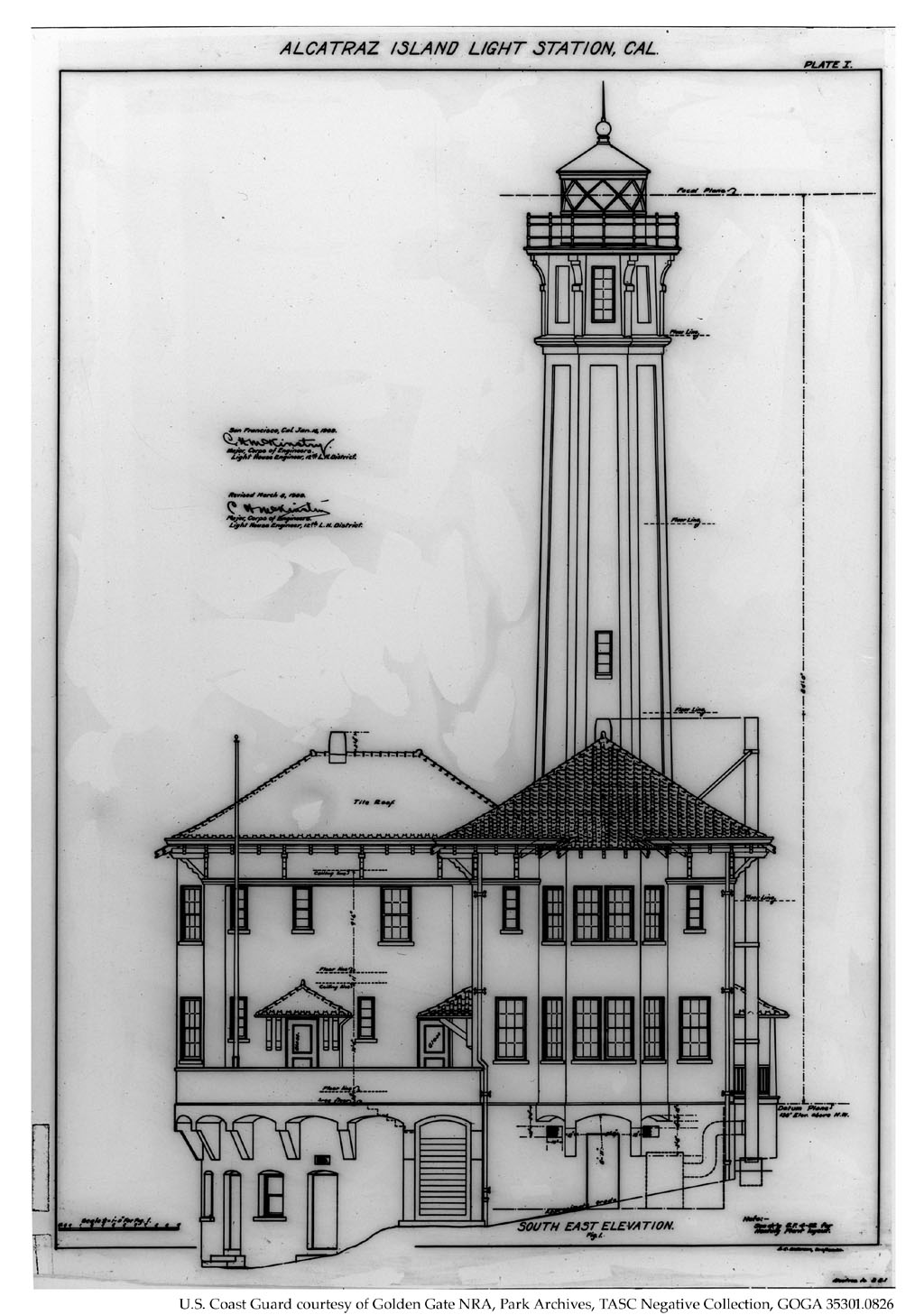
Coastguard building blueprint

There was also a telephone installed, in the 1930s, in the keepers quarters (moved to the hall later) known to and accessed only by the keepers. When the Federal Penitentiary was established on the island more telephones were installed and was made accessible to others also.

The lighthouse was operated and maintained by the keepers whose responsibility included operation of fog signals found located on the northern and southern tips of the island. The prison guards facilitated the keepers to blow the fog horns as they were in advantageous position stationed on the elevated watch towers; the guards who were in position to see "a bank of fog started to roll through the Golden Gate", would notify the keepers so that the fog horns could be activated.

=== Navigation aids ===
The leading marks which guide the ships while entering the island are the lime point which is 2.5 miles (4.0 km) east and the black point which is lime 1 mile (1.6 km) north. The island itself is interspersed with several buildings and military towers. The highest point of the island is where the light house is located. Northwestern and southeastern tips of the island have small buildings which housed the fog signals (the electric horns were installed in small buildings known as "mid twentieth century foghorn shacks".). The white light is shown by a grey tower flashes white that lasts for 0.5 seconds and eclipses' for 4.5 seconds and forming with the Fort Point light House a range for crossing the bar for the main ship. Fog signals are electric sirens, one on the southeast end sounding two blasts of 4 seconds duration, every 30 seconds while the one on the northwest end gives a single blast every 20 seconds of 5 seconds duration.

== Keepers ==
The three lighthouse keepers, known as "wickies", were dressed in prescribed formal uniforms which consisted of a "navy blue hat, sack coat, vest and trousers". Decorative buttons and insignia patches adorned their uniforms. The keepers worked on an eight-hour shift with the beacon lighted all through the year; during day time the lens was covered and protected from sun rays.

The island's head lighthouse keepers included:

- Michael Cassin (1853–1855)
- John Sloan (1855–1856)
- Underwhill Van Wagner (1856–1862)
- Hartford Joy (1862–1872)
- Amasa Bushnell (1872–1874)
- William W. Scott (1874–1875)
- John A. F. McFarland (1875–1878, 1882–1888)
- John T. Huie (1878–1882)
- Benjamin F. Leeds (1888–1905)
- Henry W. Young (1905–1909)
- James Anderson (1909 – at least 1912)
- Frederick Arthur Harrington (1919–1938) was the keeper of both the light houses and remained as keeper till his death in 1938.
- Harry Davis (1938 – at least 1940)
- Edward H. Schneider (1950 – 1959)
- Norman Fornachon (at least 1962 – 1963)

== Gallery ==
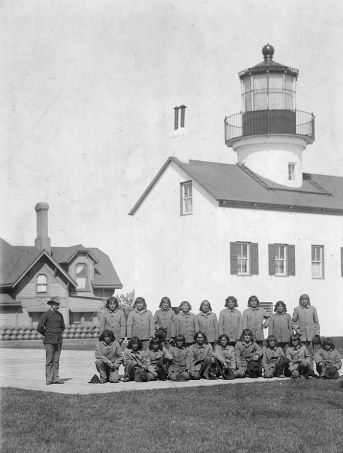
Hopi inmates and original light

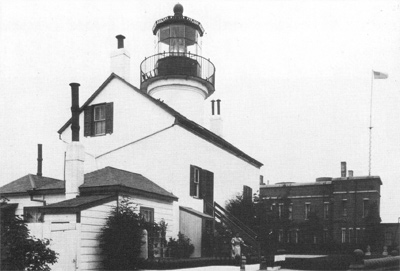
Original lighthouse, c.1894

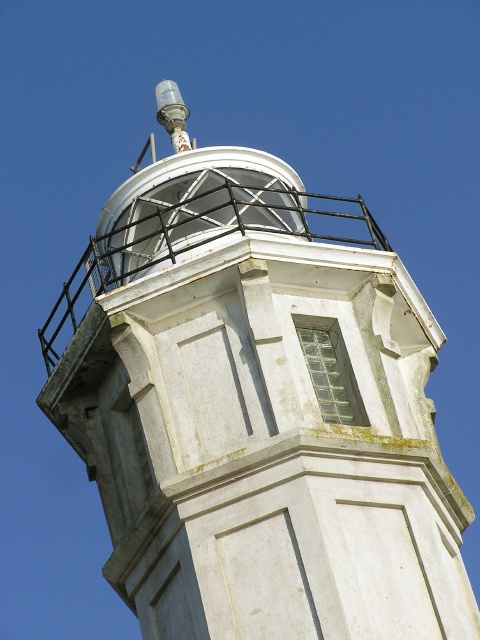
Top of light

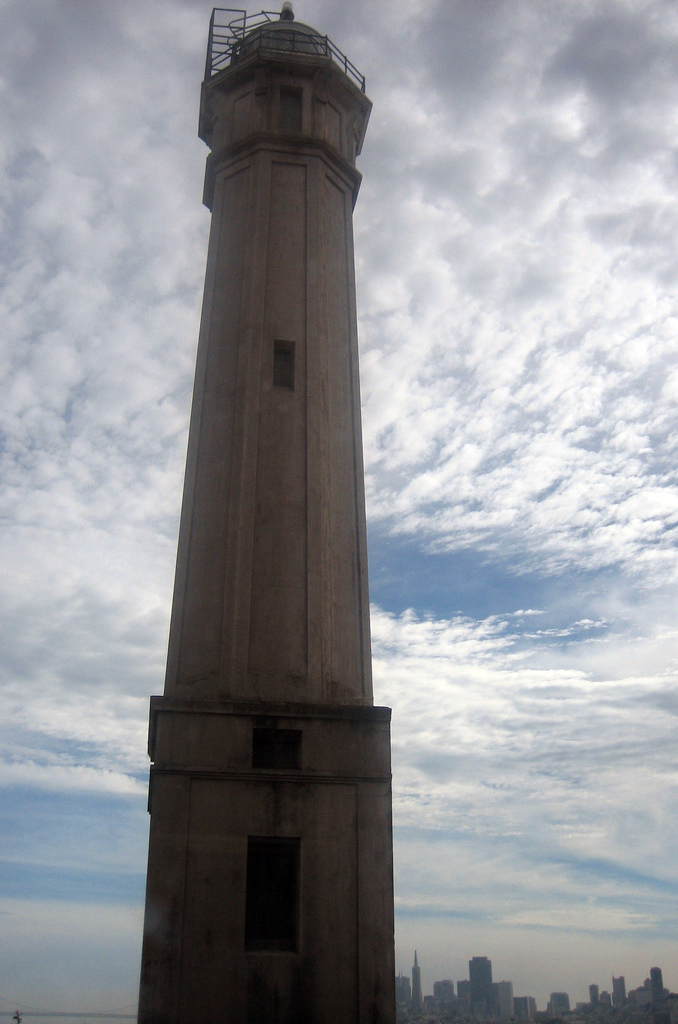
Viewed from inland

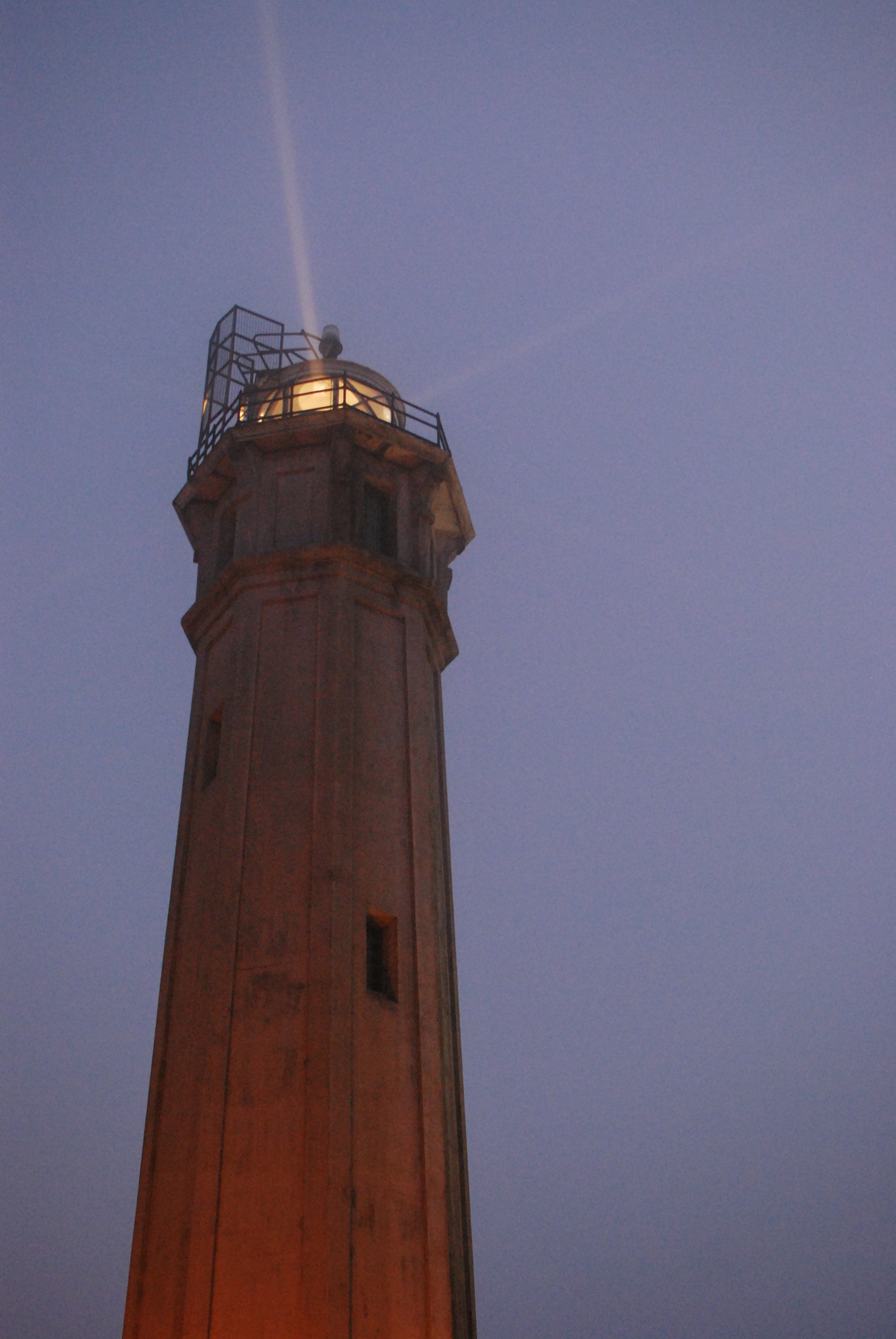
Light on

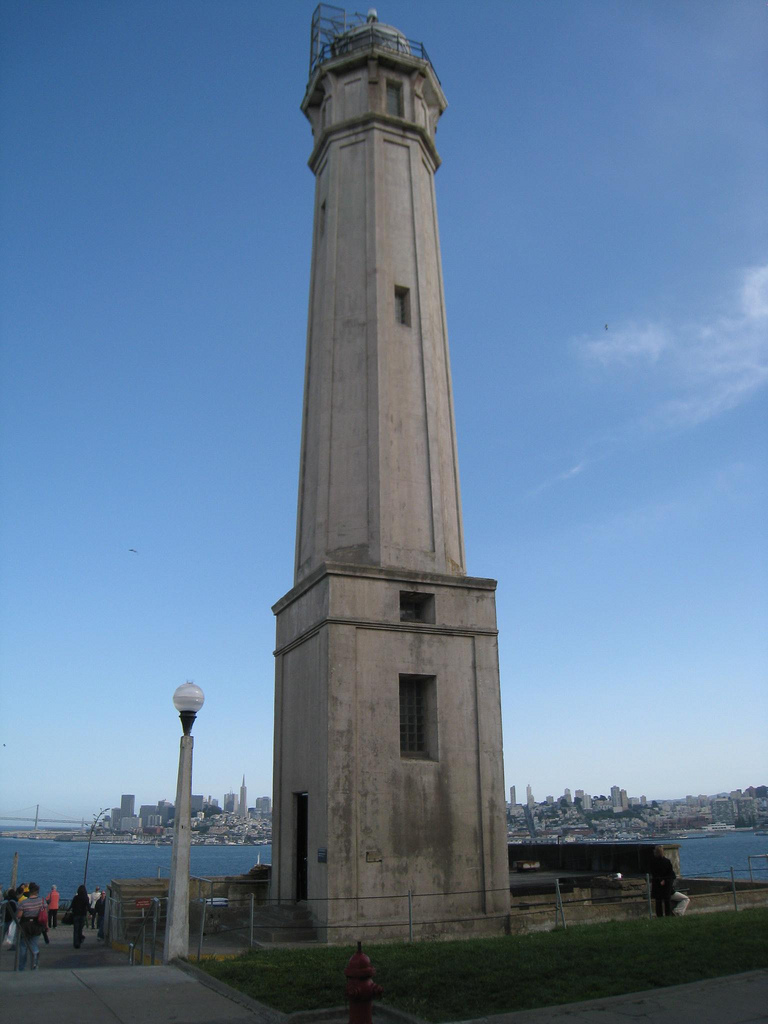
Viewed from inland

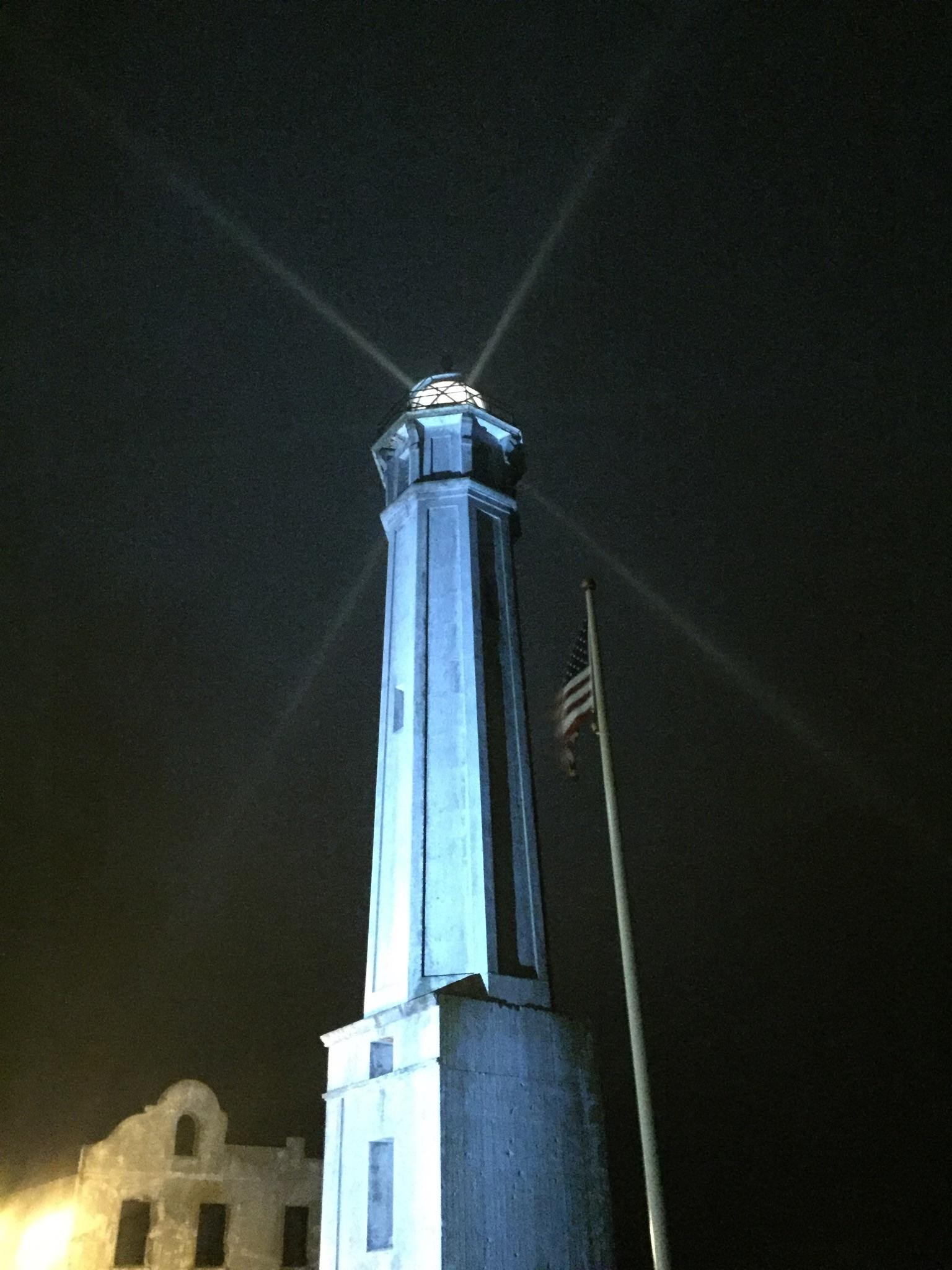
Sunrise view of Lighthouse

== See also ==
- List of lighthouses in the United States
