= Cape Cod style =

Style of lighthouse architecture

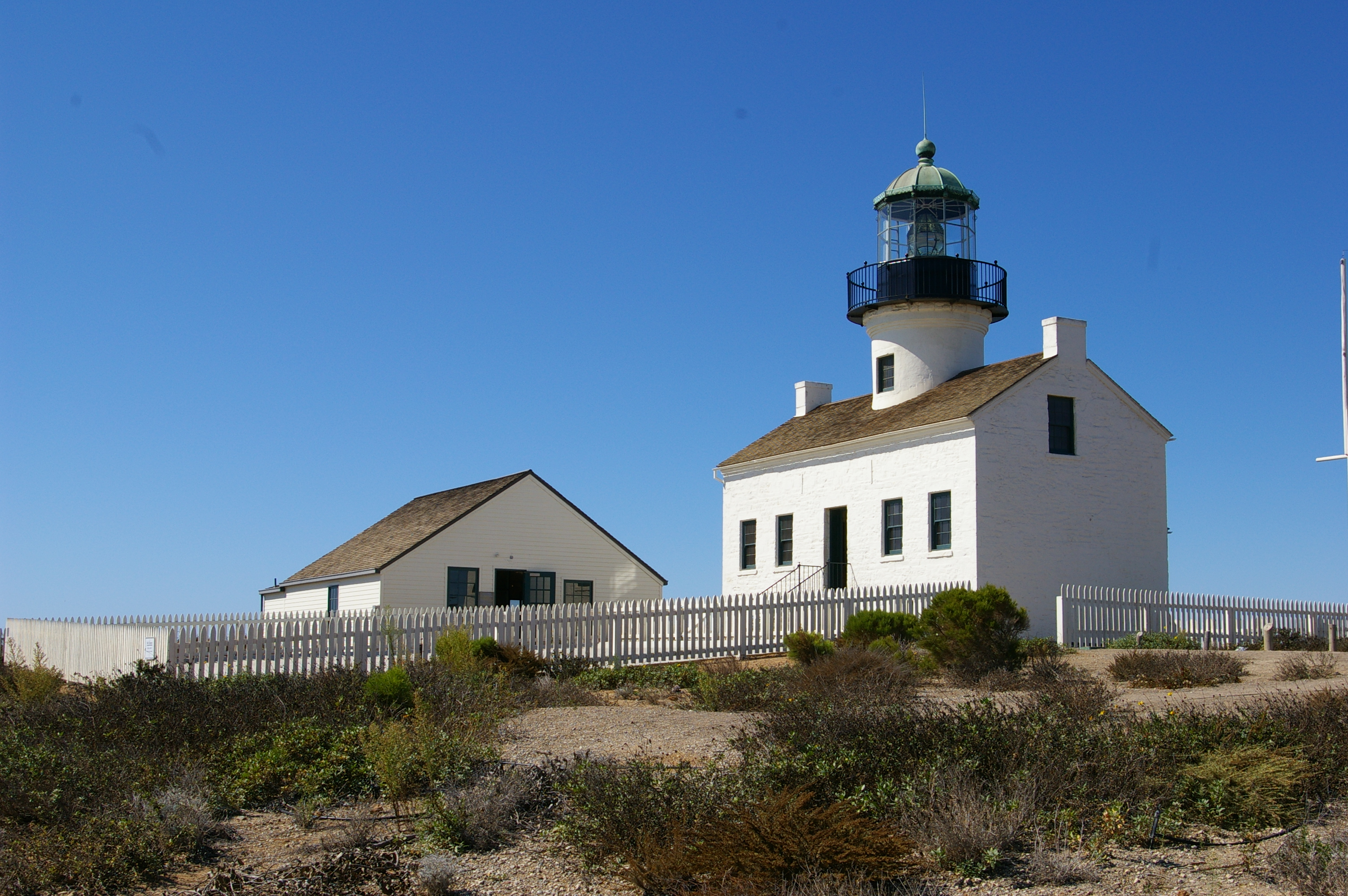
Old Point Loma lighthouse

Cape Cod style was a style of lighthouse architecture that originated on Cape Cod in Massachusetts during the early 1800s, and which became predominant to the West Coast, where numerous well-preserved examples still exist. In such lighthouses, the light tower was attached directly to the keeper's dwelling, and centered on the roof; entry was achieved through a stairway in the top floor of the dwelling.

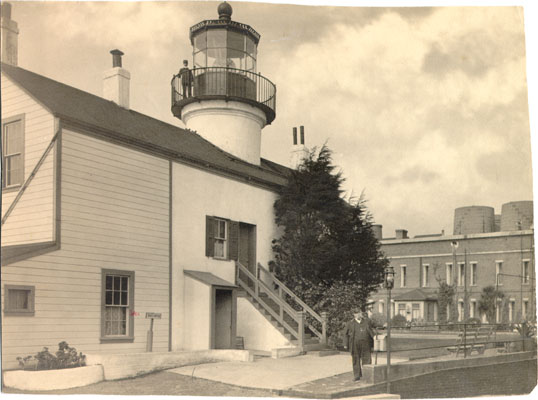
Alcatraz Island Light in the 1890s

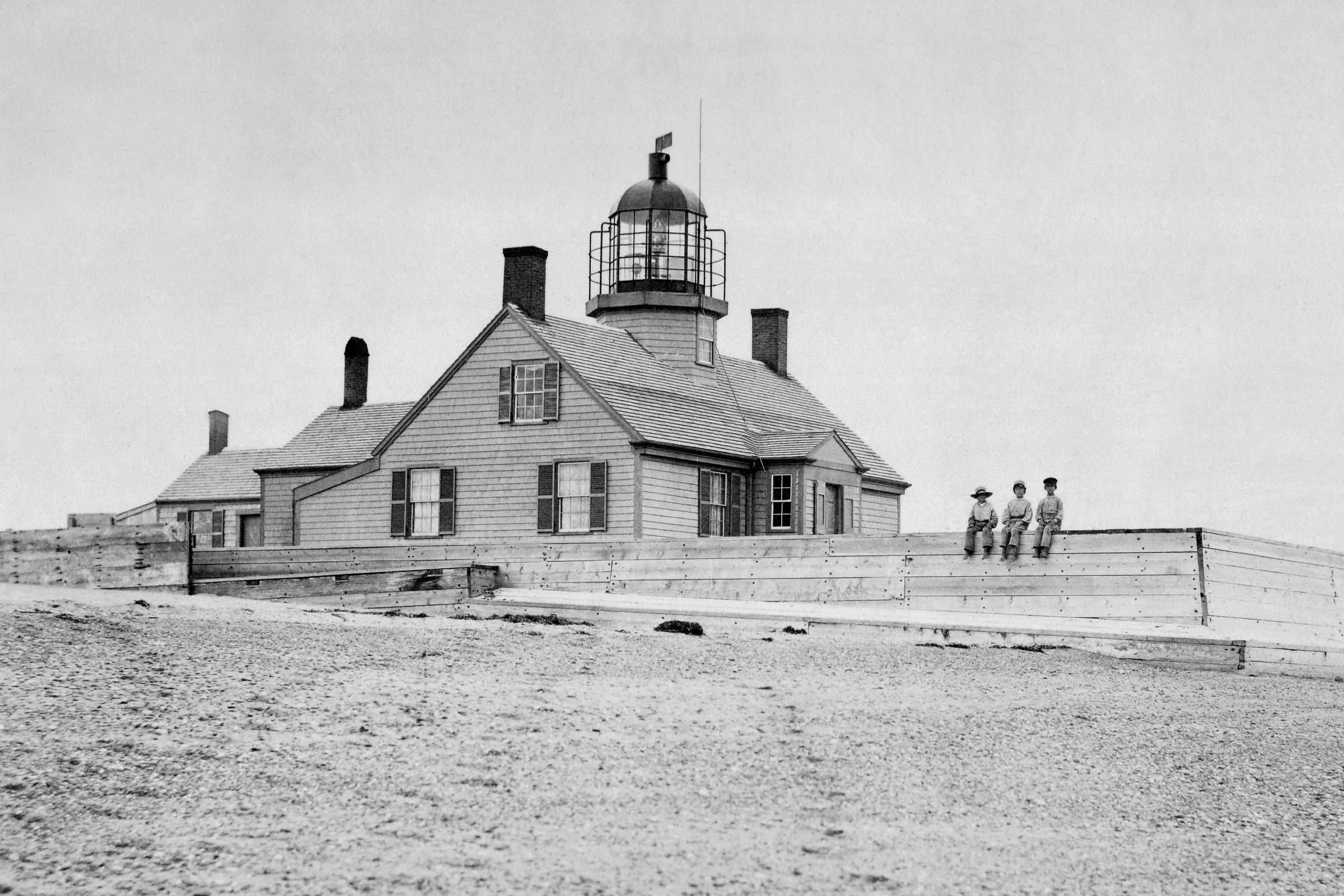
Long Point Light in Provincetown, circa 1830, doubled as the first schoolhouse for Long Point, now a ghost village

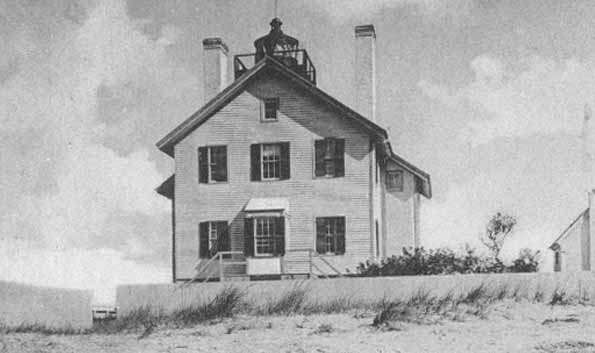
West Dennis Light on Cape Cod

No lighthouses built in the Cape Cod style exist today on the East Coast. The original Alcatraz Island Light, the first lighthouse to be built on the West Coast, was built using this style.

== See also ==
- Cape Cod (house)
