= Long Point Light =

Lighthouse in Massachusetts, United States

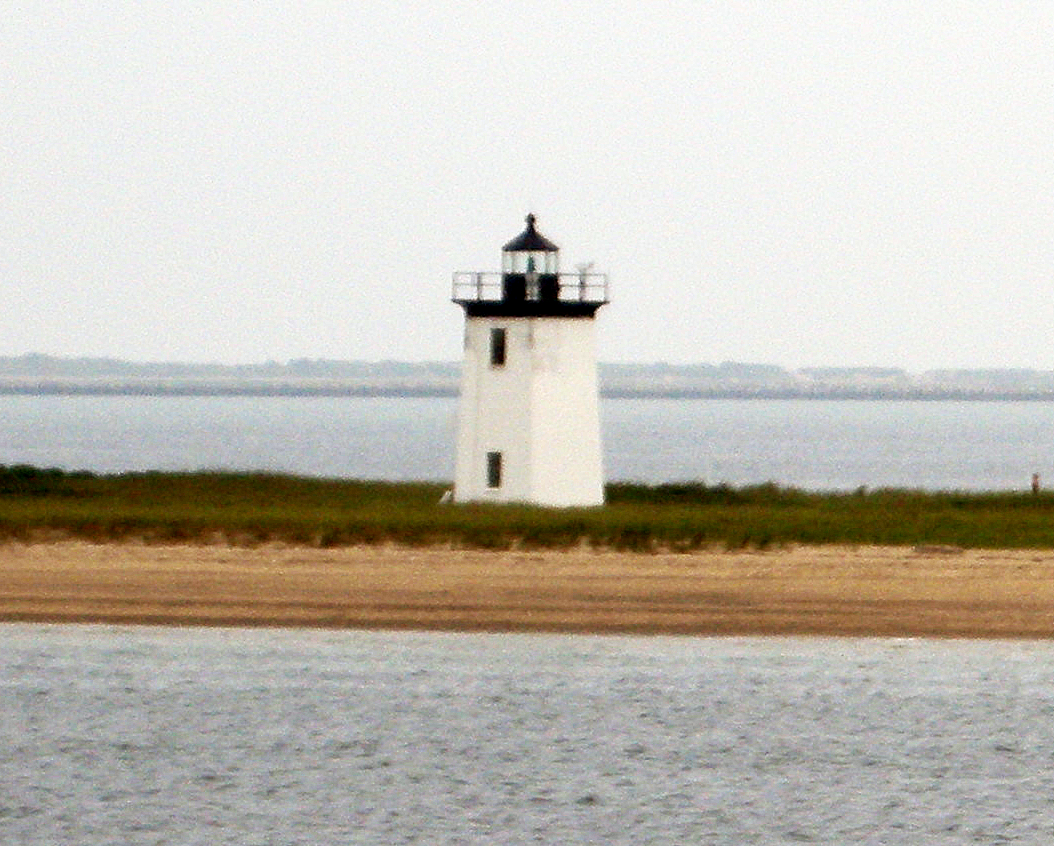
- Long Point Light in 2010
- Location: Long Point, Provincetown, Massachusetts
- Coordinates: 42°01′59″N 70°10′07″W

Tower
- Constructed: 1827
- Foundation: Natural, emplaced
- Construction: Brick
- Automated: 1952
- Height: 38 feet (12 m)
- Shape: Square tower
- Markings: White with black lantern
- Heritage: National Register of Historic Places listed place
- Fog signal: HORN: one 2-sec blast every 15 secs (Note: Fog signal is radio activated, during times of reduced visibility, turn marine VHF-FM radio to channel 83A/157.175Mhz. Key microphone 5 times consecutively, to activate fog signal for 45 minutes.); Previous (1875): 1,200 lb (540 kg) fog bell

Light
- First lit: 1875 (re-built light)
- Focal height: 35.5 feet (10.8 m) above mean sea level
- Lens: Oil Lamp (1826); Sixth-order fresnel (1856); Fifth-order fresnel (1875; Solar-powered 300 mm lantern (1982)
- Range: 8 nautical miles (15 km; 9.2 mi)
- Characteristic: Oc G 4s (Green, occulting every 4 seconds)
- Long Point Light Station
- U.S. National Register of Historic Places
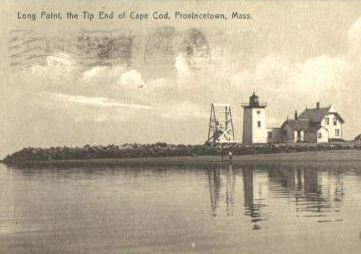
- 1909 postcard Long Point Light
- MPS: Lighthouses of Massachusetts TR
- NRHP reference No.: 87002039
- Added to NRHP: September 28, 1987

Long Point Light Station is a historic lighthouse at the northeast tip of Long Point in Provincetown, Massachusetts. As a navigational aid, it marks the southwest edge of the entrance to Provincetown Harbor. The United States Coast Guard Light List describes it simply as a "white square tower". The light it casts is green, occulting every 4 seconds, and, at a focal height of 35.5 feet (10.8 m) above mean sea level, has a visible range of 8 nautical miles (15 km; 9.2 mi). When the weather affords low-visibility, one can hear the station's fog horn – sounding a single blast for two seconds, and repeating every 15 seconds – as it seems to call out for (and answer calls from) its nearly-identical closest neighbor, the Wood End Light.

== History ==
By an act of Congress on May 18, 1826, the United States Government earmarked $2,500 to acquire 4 acres (0.016 km^{2}) at the extreme tip of Long Point, and to establish a lighthouse to guide mariners into the busy fishing port of Provincetown Harbor. In comparing the relative share of the gross domestic product (GDP), or "nominal GDP", that's the equivalent of today's Congress allocating $48 million in 2013 dollars.

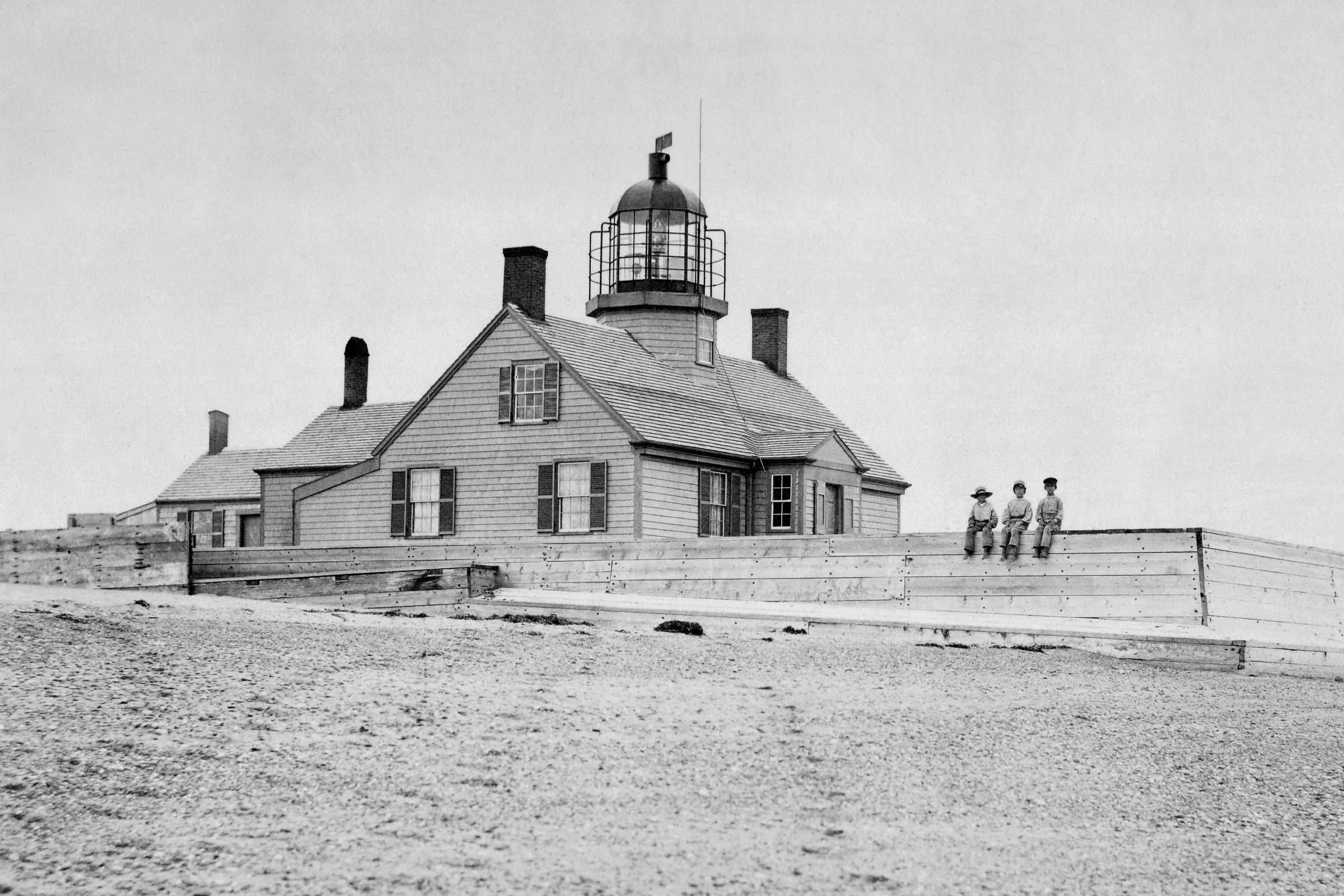
The original "Cape Cod style" light and keeper's house, c. 1830

Completed in 1827, the original Long Point Light was not a tower structure, but rather consisted of an octagonal lantern centered on the peak of the roof of the wooden keeper's house. Access to the lantern was by a spiral stair from the top floor of the house. That architectural style, common to several of Cape Cod's early 19th century lighthouses, came to be known as the "Cape Cod style" – today, however, "classic" examples of that style can only be found along the Pacific Coast.

The lantern was lit by a sixth-order Fresnel lens in 1856. By 1873, a lighthouse inspector's report noted substantial erosion, exposed wooden pilings, and poor overall condition of the light station, expressing concern that a strong storm could carry it away. Shortly thereafter, the Lighthouse Board decided to replace the entire structure. The present-day 38-foot (12 m) tall, square brick lighthouse and a one-and-one-half-story keeper's dwelling to its south were completed in 1875. The lighthouse included a larger, fifth-order Fresnel lens, and a 1,200-pound (540 kg) fog bell was installed to the north of the tower. In 1904, the station received an oil house for properly storing flammable materials used for illumination. In 1927, the intensity of the light was reduced to 29,000 candlepower.

Long Point Light underwent automation in 1952, and a modern optic replaced the Fresnel lens. In 1982, Long Point Light became the second lighthouse in Massachusetts to be equipped with solar panels to power the light and fog signal equipment. The abandoned keeper's dwelling and fog signal building were demolished around the same time.

The Long Point Light Station was added to the National Historic Register in 1987. The light and its 1904 oil house are the only structures left on Long Point, which is now part of the Cape Cod National Seashore.

=== The village of Long Point ===
From its inception in 1827 until the late 1850s, the lighthouse shared the peninsula with a thriving village of Long Point. By 1830, the lighthouse became the site of Long Point's first school, starting with only three children. The village grew to include the homes of 38 fishing families, a schoolhouse with up to 60 children, a post office, bakery, boat landings, breakwaters, and several saltworks which utilized windmills to pump seawater.

For various reasons, the settlement was ultimately disbanded. Most of the families took their houses with them when they left — the houses were placed on rafts and floated across the harbor to Provincetown's West End. Several of those historic "floater" homes are still standing, and can be identified by looking for the distinctive blue and white plaques.

=== The Long Point Battery ===
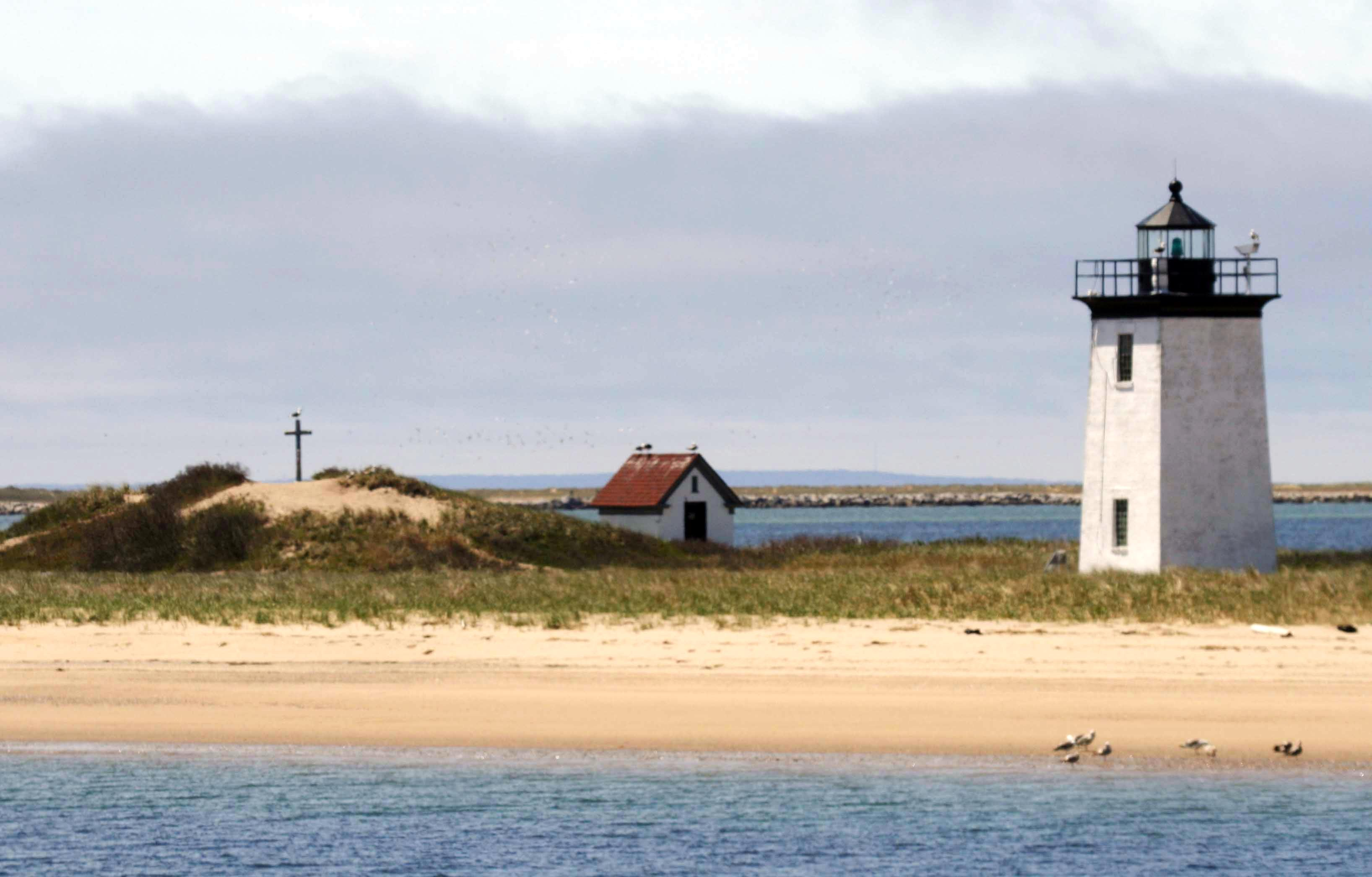
View from the East (2009). The mound is what remains of the Long Point Battery.

Around the middle of the American Civil War, in 1863, the Union Army constructed fortifications called the Long Point Battery. It consisted of two earthwork artillery batteries, with a total of nine 32-pound (15 kg) guns between them, plus a barracks to house a company of 98 soldiers, an officer's quarters, and stables.

The base was operational until 1872, but never saw any combat action – as a result, local residents took to calling the batteries "Fort Useless" and "Fort Ridiculous".

== Present day ==
Currently the U.S. Coast Guard owns and controls Provincetown's three lighthouses (Long Point Light, Wood End Light, and Race Point Light). It is leased to and maintained by the Cape Cod Chapter of the American Lighthouse Foundation. The grounds are open to the public, and the lighthouse tower is closed.

In December 2009, preservationists proposed to rebuild the keeper's house as a bed and breakfast similar to the operation at Race Point. The Coast Guard's lease is due to expire in 2015, and local officials speculate that the property could be turned over to the National Park Service, which maintains and operates the National Seashore.

The secluded beach by the lighthouse can be reached by renting a small boat at Land's End or using the Long Point Beach Ferry, a 20-minute shuttle from MacMillian Pier or from the Boatyard dock in the West End. It is also possible to hike out, along the Provincetown Causeway and then along the beach, a three-mile distance each way.

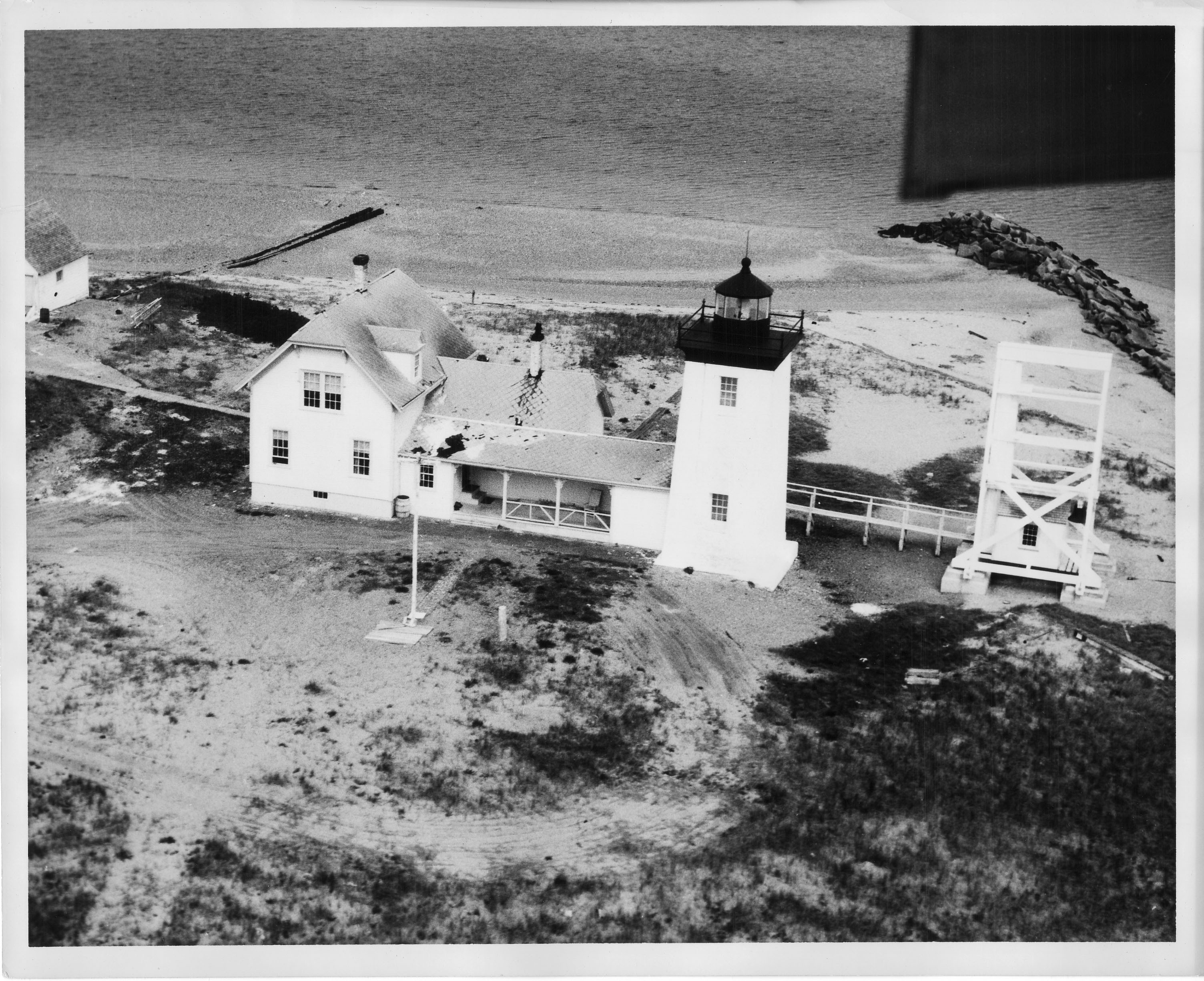
The second light, built 1875 (still in use) and keeper's house (since removed)

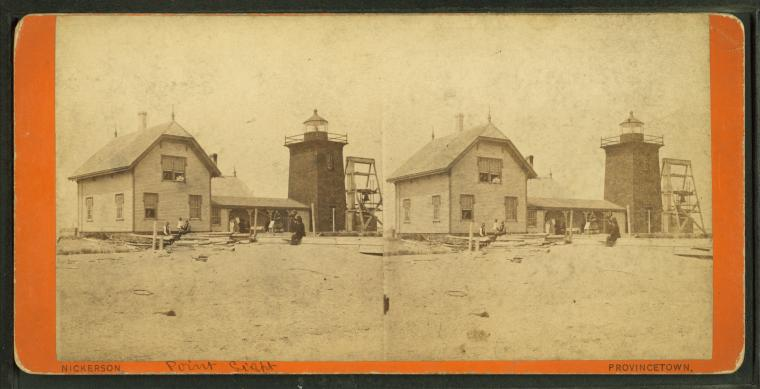
Stereoscopic photo of the 2nd light, shortly after it was built (note the dark brick)

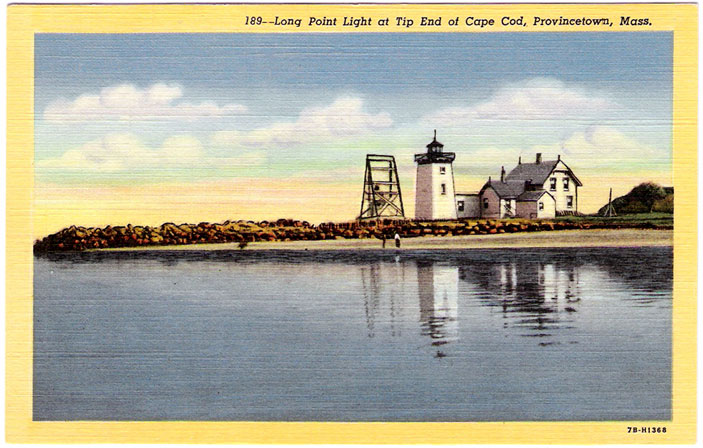
1947 colorized postcard, a reprint of the 1909 version (also on this page).

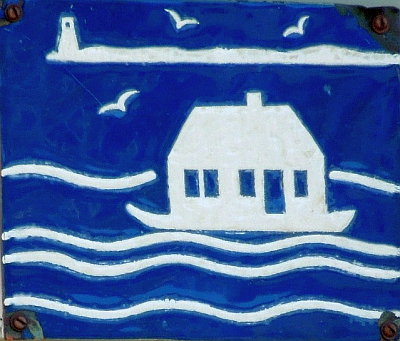
Houses bearing this plaque were in the Long Point settlement, and were floated across the harbor

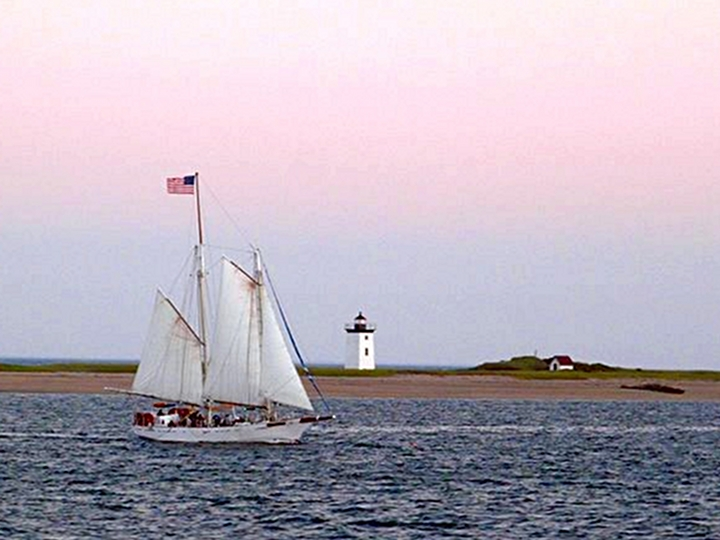
View of Long Point from downtown, 2012

View of Longpoint from Provincetown Harbor, 2026
