= Wood End Light =

Lighthouse in Massachusetts, United States

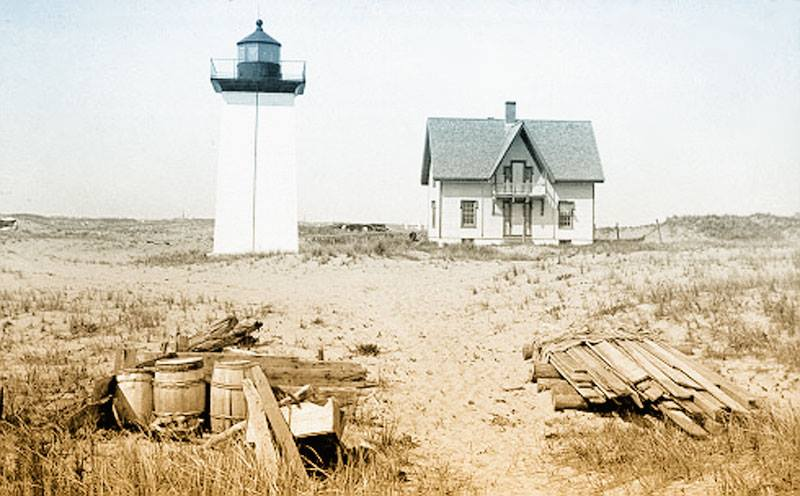
- US Coast Guard photo, not dated.
- Location: Provincetown, Massachusetts
- Coordinates: 42°1′16.4″N 70°11′36.6″W

Tower
- Constructed: 1864 (lookout station); 1872 (lighthouse built)
- Foundation: Concrete
- Construction: Brick
- Automated: 1961
- Height: 39 feet (12 m)
- Shape: Square, pyramidal
- Markings: White with black lantern (originally painted brown)
- Heritage: National Register of Historic Places listed place
- Fog signal: Horn:one 3-second blast every 30 seconds (Note: Fog signal is radio activated, during times of reduced visibility, turn marine VHF-FM radio to channel 83A/157.175Mhz. Key microphone 5 times consecutively, to activate fog signal for 45 minutes.); Previous (1902): 1,000 lb (450 kg) fog bell

Light
- First lit: 1872
- Focal height: 45 feet (14 m) above mean sea level
- Lens: Fifth-order Fresnel lens (original), VRB-25 (current)
- Range: 13 nautical miles (24 km; 15 mi)
- Characteristic: Fl Red 10s (Red flash every 10 seconds)
- Wood End Light Lookout Station
- U.S. National Register of Historic Places
- MPS: Lighthouses of Massachusetts TR
- NRHP reference No.: 87001504
- Added to NRHP: June 15, 1987

Wood End Light Lookout Station is a historic lighthouse, located at the southwest end of Long Point in Provincetown, Massachusetts. It is located at Wood End, near the southernmost extent of the Provincetown Spit, and acts as a navigational aid to vessels on their approach to Provincetown Harbor. The Long Point Light Station, further down the peninsula at the tip of Long Point is an identical design and completed in 1875, three years after Wood End Light.

The light was first illuminated on November 20, 1872, and added to the National Register of Historic Places in 1987. In 1981, Wood End Light became the first Massachusetts lighthouse to be converted to use solar energy to power the light and fog signal equipment.

In 1896 a wooden keeper's house was built, as well as a storage shed and oil house. With the changing times and no need to man the light station, it was decided in 1961 to raze the buildings leaving just the tower and oil house.

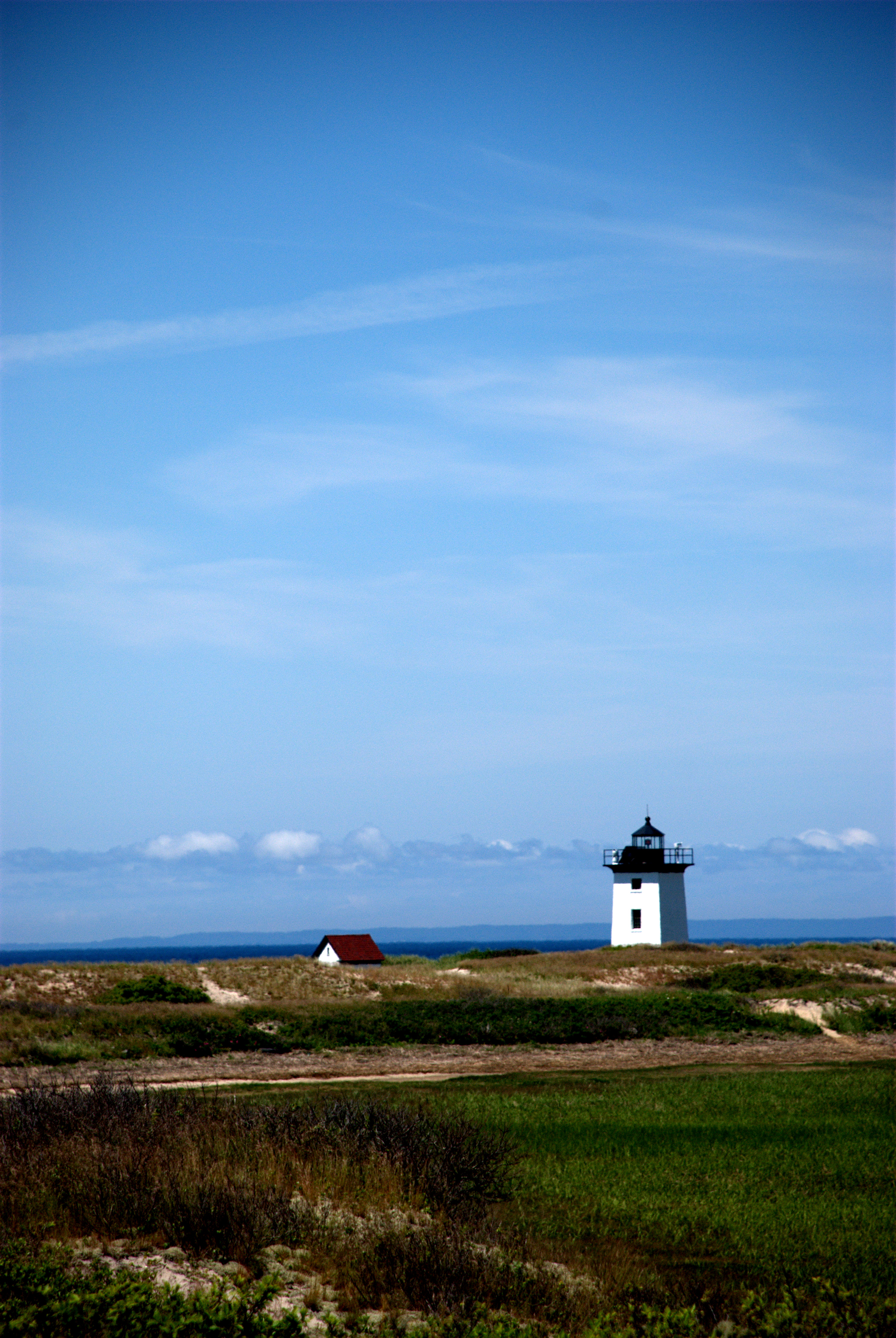
Wood End Light, 2009
