= East Harbor =

Lake in North Truro, Massachusetts

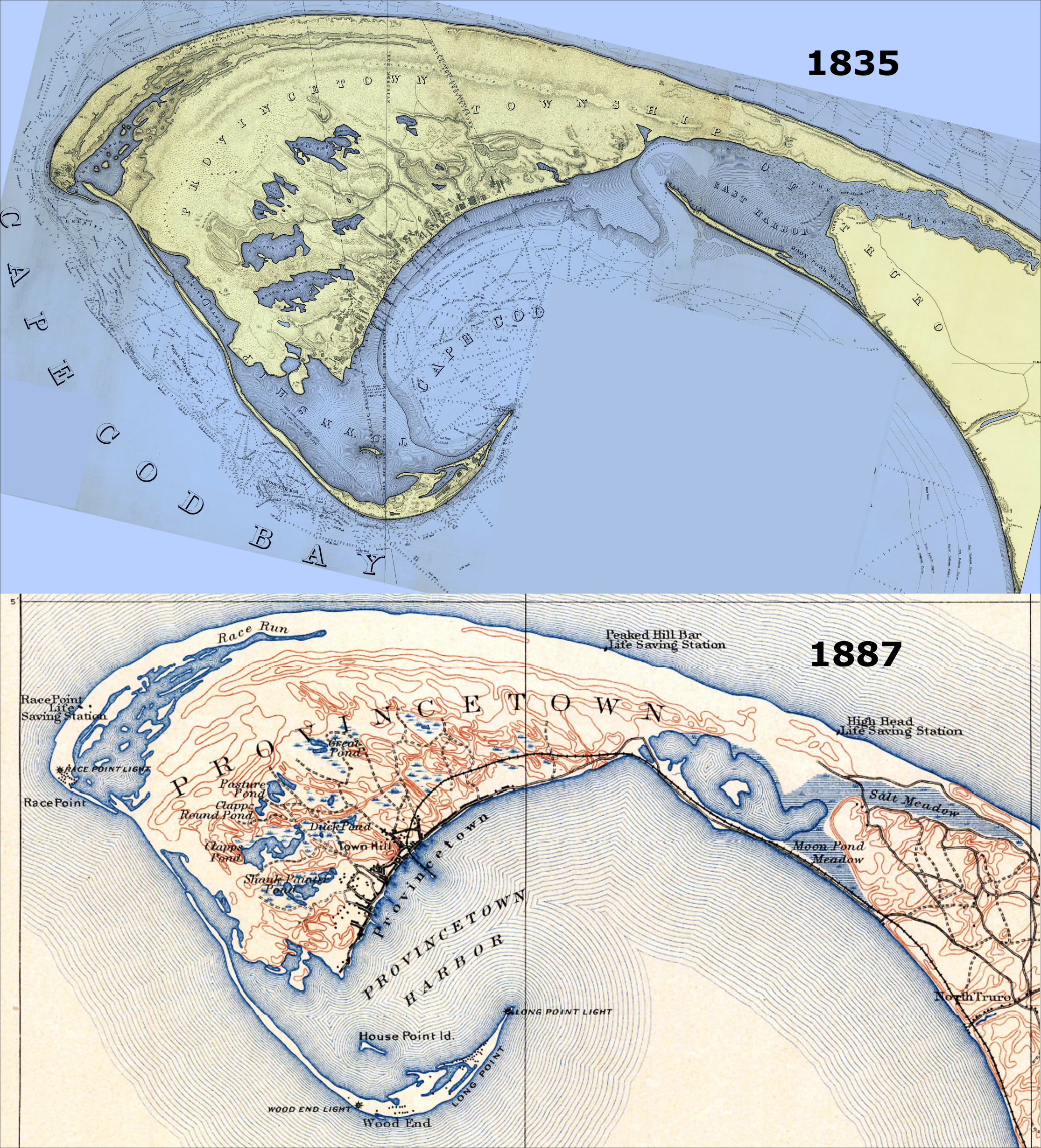
- The East Harbor in 1835 and closed off in 1887, before it was renamed Pilgrim Lake
- Interactive map of East Harbor
- Location in Cape Cod

Location
- Country: United States
- Location: North Truro, Massachusetts
- Coordinates: 42.0589°N 70.1295°W

Details
- Size: 720 acres (1.13 sq mi; 2.9 km^{2})

East Harbor is a tidal estuary in Truro, Massachusetts that was originally a natural harbor until it was cut off from Cape Cod Bay to form a salt marsh lagoon, later renamed Pilgrim Lake. It is now within the Cape Cod National Seashore.

== Original Harbor ==
Until the latter half of the nineteenth century, the East Harbor was a natural embayment deep enough to shelter Provincetown's fishing fleet during the winter, and was connected to Cape Cod Bay through a 1,000-foot-wide (300 m) inlet. This effectively isolated neighboring Provincetown from Truro and other towns on Cape Cod.

Until late in the 19th century, there were no roads leading in or out of Provincetown – the only way to travel by land to the rest of Cape Cod was to first walk north, traversing a series of tall, rolling sand dunes, and to then follow the thin strip of beach along the northern shore line, known as the "backshore". A wooden bridge was erected over the East Harbor in 1854, though still requiring a trek through a sand route, only to be destroyed by a winter storm and ice two years later. Although the bridge was replaced the following year, a traveler using it still had to traverse several miles over a sand route, which, together with the backshore route, would occasionally be washed out by storms. Prior to the railroad's arrival in 1873, Provincetown was like an island, in that it relied almost entirely upon the sea for its communication, travel, and commerce needs.

== Back Barrier Lagoon – Pilgrim Lake ==
The harbor was artificially separated from Cape Cod Bay and cut off from tidal flow in 1868, when a dike was constructed across the inlet to facilitate the laying of track for the arrival of the railroad. The wooden bridge and sand road were finally replaced by a formal roadway in 1877.

The exclusion of tides changed the harbor into a back barrier salt marsh lagoon. In the early 1900s, a real-estate developer named this lagoon "Pilgrim Lake", and the U.S. Geological Survey officially adopted that name in February 1910.

But it also caused salinity to decline from natural levels of ~25-30 parts per thousand to nearly freshwater by the time of the first documented fish survey in 1911. By this time the native estuarine fauna were largely extinguished.

Over time, the blockage of tides had caused further ecological problems. The lack of tidal flushing deprived the system of salty, nutrient-poor, oxygen-rich Cape Cod Bay water and it became a stagnant freshwater pond. These conditions resulted in midge outbreaks, fish kills, and a proliferation of exotic species.

After almost 140 years of impoundment, no native salt marsh vegetation was left in or around Pilgrim Lake. Instead, the floodplain was taken over by a non-native cattail species and some highly invasive plants like purple loosestrife and common reed.

== Restoration ==
After an oxygen depletion and fish kill in 2001, the town of Truro and the National Park Service began to explore options to restore the estuary. They focused on a drainage pipe connecting Pilgrim Lake to Cape Cod Bay. This ~700-foot-long (210 m), 4 feet (1.2 m) diameter culvert had been fitted with clapper valves to allow freshwater to drain out of Pilgrim Lake, but prevented marine tides from flowing back into the system.

To restore partial tidal exchange and to improve water quality, they opened the clapper valves, which have remained open continuously since November 2002. Despite limits on tidal exchange imposed by the pipe's small diameter, and the distance that it travels underground, they have observed a substantial response in the recovery of salinity and estuarine biota.

Though not able to return to use as a ship-accessible harbor, in June 2008, Pilgrim Lake was officially renamed back to its original moniker, East Harbor.

The 720-acre East Harbor system includes Moon Meadow, Salt Meadow and the East Harbor lagoon.
