= Little Beach Hill =

Mountain in Barnstable County, Massachusetts

- Location within Massachusetts Location within the United States

Highest point
- Elevation: 3 ft (0.91 m)
- Coordinates: 41°54′04″N 70°04′17″W

Geography
- Location: Cape Cod, Massachusetts
- Topo map: USGS Wellfleet

Little Beach Hill is a mountain in Barnstable County, Massachusetts. It is located 3.2 miles (5.1 km) southwest of Wellfleet in the Town of Wellfleet. Great Beach Hill is located northeast of Little Beach Hill.
