= The Louis Comfort Tiffany Foundation =

American charitable foundation

The Louis Comfort Tiffany Foundation was founded in 1918 by Louis Comfort Tiffany to operate his estate, Laurelton Hall, in Cold Spring Harbor, Long Island. It was designed to be a summer retreat for artists and craftspeople. In 1946 the estate closed and the foundation changed its purpose from a retreat to the bestowing of grants to artists.

The first director of the foundation was Sarah Eileen Hanley.

In closing down her father's residence after his death, George Frederick Kunz' daughter, Ruby Zinsser, donated two paintings by Louis C. Tiffany to the Tiffany Foundation. "In 1935, the family of George F. Kunz donated two Tiffany paintings to the picture gallery." In this, she was following her father's inclination, since he had previously donated a Syrian bracelet and mineral collection to the Foundation in 1928.

== Notable fellowship award recipients ==
- Guy Anderson, American painter from the Northwest School
- Marco Brambilla, Italian-born Canadian contemporary artist and film director
- Nicole Cherubini, American visual artist and ceramicist
- Mario Cooper, American watercolor painter and sculptor 1949
- Marsha Cottrell, American artist
- Alfred Crimi, American muralist and painter
- Moyra Davey, New York–based artist specializing in photography, video and writing
- Arthur Deshaies, American artist and printmaker
- Janet Doub Erickson, for textile design in 1955, blockprinter, founder of the Blockhouse of Boston, and author
- Herbert Ferber (1930), New York City–based Abstract Expressionism sculptor
- Teresita Fernández, New York City–based artist
- Ann Gardner, American glass artist, mosaicist, and installation artist
- Adam Helms, American artist based in Brooklyn, New York
- Evan Holloway, artist based in Los Angeles.
- Steve Hurd, 2005 award recipient, Los Angeles based visual artist.
- Luise Clayborn Kaish, American artist known for her work in sculpture, painting, and collage
- Karen LaMonte, artist.
- Ciel Bergman, then known as Cheryl Bowers, an American painter.
- Dante Marioni, American glass artist, work featured in the National Museum of Art, Renwick Gallery
- Josiah McElheny, artist/sculptor, award winner of the Foundation's 1995 Biennial Competition
- Paul Meltsner, WPA-era painter and muralist
- George Joseph Mess, 1931 award recipient, was an American painter, printmaker, commercial artist, and art educator based in Indianapolis, Indiana
- Wardell Milan, New York–based artist
- Marilyn Minter, painter and photographer
- Eric Norstad, Northern California ceramicist and architect
- Rinaldo Paluzzi, American and Spanish painter and sculptor
- Elizabeth Shannon Phillips, 1931 award recipient, American painter and muralist
- Mavis Pusey, American abstract painter
- Francis J. Quirk, American painter, 1932
- Andrew Raftery, American engraver and painter. Recipient of Louis Comfort Tiffany Award in 2003.
- Edna Reindel, American painter, illustrator, sculptor, and muralist. Recipient of Fellowship in 1926 and 1932
- Noel Rockmore, American painter from New York City and New Orleans. Recipient of Fellowship in 1956 and 1963
- Beatriz Santiago Muñoz, Puerto Rican multi media artist. Recipient of Louis Comfort Tiffany Award in 2017.
- Concetta Scaravaglione, sculptor in New York. Recipient of Fellowship in 1928
- Larry Sultan, American photographer
- Marc Trujillo, North American artist/painter
- Anne Wilson, Chicago-based interdisciplinary artist
