= Chequesset Inn =

Hotel in Wellfleet, Massachusetts, US

Coordinates: 41.9300°N 70.0439°W

The Chequesset Inn was a 62-room hotel in Wellfleet, Massachusetts. It is credited with beginning the development of the town's tourism industry.

== History ==
The Chequesset Inn was built in 1902 on Mercantile Wharf, which stood on the banks of Wellfleet Harbor on what is currently Mayo Beach. L.D. Baker commissioned the construction of the inn after the collapse of the town's fishing industry. Before the inn was built, the town was home to a few Boston residents during the summer, but not many. The decline of the town's population was reversed after construction and tourism grew for years, giving rise to many businesses.

The Great Depression hit Wellfleet's economy hard in the 1930s, and the inn didn't survive to see it through. In 1934, a particularly cold winter caused ice chunks to form in the harbor, heavily damaging the pier's pilings and causing a partial collapse of the inn. The entire structure was torn down shortly after.

== Today ==
A marker currently sits where the wharf met the road. At low tide, the harbor's water recedes several hundred yards and the rotted stumps of the pilings of Mercantile Wharf are visible.
