= Clifton Field =

Airfield in Wellfleet, Massachusetts, US

- IATA: none; ICAO: none

Summary
- Operator: Public
- Location: Wellfleet, Massachusetts
- Built: Unknown
- In use: Before 1960-Around 1962
- Occupants: Public
- Elevation AMSL: 43 ft / 13 m
- Coordinates: 41°53′2.32″N 69°58′15.3″W
- Interactive map of Clifton Field

Clifton Field was an airfield operational in the early-20th century in Wellfleet, Massachusetts.
