= Paluzzi =

Paluzzi is a surname. Notable people with the surname include:

- Gaspare Paluzzi degli Albertoni (1566–1614), Italian Roman Catholic Bishop, and Apostolic Collector to Portugal
- Paluzzo Paluzzi Altieri degli Albertoni (1623–1698), Italian Catholic Cardinal and Cardinal-Nephew to Pope Clement X
- Luciana Paluzzi (born 1937), Italian-American actress
- Rinaldo Paluzzi (1927–2013), American-Spanish painter and sculptor
