= Merrick Island =

Island in Massachusetts, United States

- Location within Massachusetts Location within the United States

Geography
- Coordinates: 41°57′00″N 70°03′28″W
- Highest elevation: 79 ft (24.1 m)

Administration
- United States
- State: Massachusetts
- Location: Cape Cod

Merrick Island is an island in Barnstable County, Massachusetts. It is located 1.5 miles (2.4 km) northwest of Wellfleet in the Town of Wellfleet. Great Beach Hill is located south-southwest of Merrick Island. It is notable for its relatively large and pure oak forests.
