= Sarah Hanley =

Sarah Hanley may refer to:

- Sarah Eileen Hanley (1883–1958), painter
- Sarah Bond Hanley (1865–1959), American politician in Illinois
