= Totem (Paluzzi) =

- Artist: Rinaldo Paluzzi
- Year: 1982
- Type: Stainless Steel
- Dimensions: 980 cm × 150 cm × 150 cm (384 in × 60 in × 60 in)
- Location: Indianapolis, Indiana, United States; 39°46′04″N 86°10′17″W
- Owner: White River State Park

Totem, is a public artwork by American-Spanish artist Rinaldo Paluzzi, located on the grounds of White River State Park, which is in Indianapolis, Indiana, United States. The sculpture is made of stainless steel and is a triangular shaped vertical "tube" with triangular and trapezoidal cut-outs in the steel. The piece sits centered atop a concrete circle, 40 feet in diameter, with a sundial face. The piece was constructed in 1982 and dedicated November 9, 1982. It is copyrighted 1983. The sculpture was the first public art piece in Indianapolis fully funded by individuals, businesses and institutions.

== Description ==
The sculpture also has a bronze plaque placed just south of it. The plaque reads: TOTEM/BY RINALDO PALUZZI (AMERICAN B. 1927)/FABRICATED BY MITCHUM-SHAEFER, INC./OF INDIANAPOLIS AND DONATED TO THE WHITE RIVER STATE PARK ON NOV. 9, 1982/INDIVIDUAL CONTRIBUTORS (33 names listed) INSTITUTIONAL CONTRIBUTORS (30 names listed).

== Information ==
White River State Park owns the piece, which was fabricated by Mitchum-Shaefer, Inc. based out of Indianapolis. Over 60 individuals and institutions contributed the $95,000 to install the piece making it the first art piece in Indianapolis in which funds were crowdsourced for a public artwork. The piece cost $91,500 total to complete and install. Donors included Allstate, Allison Transmission, Eli Lilly and Company, and RCA. A series of limited edition lithographs of the sculpture were created by Paluzzi and sold for $250 each. The sculpture was dedicated on November 9, 1982, and was copyrighted in 1983. The Scecina High School marching band performed at the dedication ceremony. Then mayor William H. Hudnut spoke at the ceremony and presented Paluzzi with the keys to the city.
