= George Joseph Mess =

American painter

- Born: June 30, 1898; Cincinnati, Ohio, US
- Died: June 24, 1962 (aged 63); Indianapolis, Indiana, US
- Resting place: Crown Hill Cemetery and Arboretum, Section 39, Lot 109; Indianapolis
- Known for: Painting and aquatint printmaking

George Joseph Mess (June 30, 1898 – June 24, 1962) was an American painter, printmaker, commercial artist, and art educator. The Cincinnati, Ohio, native began his career as a commercial artist and teacher; however, he became nationally known for his work as an etcher, printmaker, and painter. Along his wife, Evelynne Mess Daily, he became a prominent member of the Indianapolis and Brown County, Indiana, arts communities. Mess produced mostly Impressionist-style landscapes as a painter, but he was especially known for his aquatint etchings and prints of rural scenes in the modern styles of the 1930s and 1940s. Mess was also a founder of the Circle Art Academy, a commercial art school in Indianapolis, Indiana, that operated from 1927 to 1932, and founded a local engraving company. Mess was the recipient of several prizes and awards for his art from the Hoosier Salon, the Herron Art Institute (a forerunner of the Herron School of Art and Design and the Indianapolis Museum of Art), the Indiana State Fair, and various state and local arts clubs. His work is represented in the permanent collections of the Smithsonian American Art Museum, the Metropolitan Museum of Art, the Indianapolis Museum of Art, the Indiana Historical Society, and Minnetrista, among others. His illustrations also appeared in several print publications.

== Early life and education ==
George Joseph Mess was born in Cincinnati, Ohio, on June 30, 1898, to Anna Gleis Mess (1875–1960) and Joseph J. Mess (1871–1933). Mess's father was of German heritage; his mother's family was of German and Dutch ancestry. The Mess family moved to Indianapolis, Indiana, in 1899, when Joseph Mess took a job as a foreman of the photoengraving department at the Indianapolis News, one of the city's major daily newspapers.

George Mess, second of the family's three sons, became interested in art and wanted to become an artist at an early age. At the age of thirteen he received a scholarship to attend Saturday-morning art classes for children at the John Herron Art Institute, a forerunner to the Indianapolis Museum of Art. Mess also attended Indianapolis's public schools, graduating from Emmerich Manual High School in 1916. His two brothers, Arthur and Gordon, also became artists.

After Mess graduated from high school he worked as a technician for Western Electric in Indianapolis before joining the U.S. Army in 1918. Although he served during World War I, Mess was never sent overseas. After receiving an honorable discharge from the military, Mess enrolled at Butler University and joined Delta Tau Delta fraternity. While attending Butler he earned extra money by working at a local lumberyard. Mess left Butler after a year and spent a semester at Teachers College, Columbia University, studying art under Arthur Wesley Dow. Mess returned to Indianapolis in 1921.

== Marriage and family ==
Mess met artist Evelynne Bernloehr while attending one of William Forsyth's evening art classes at the Herron Art Institute. Within months of their first meeting, Mess and Bernloehr were married on April 28, 1925, at her family's home in Indianapolis. The couple set up an art studio in the living room of their home in suburban Broad Ripple. In 1941 they also bought a 40-acre (16-hectare) farm outside Nashville in Brown County, Indiana, to use as a weekend retreat from the city. Evelynne and George Mess had no children. Seven years after Mess's death in 1962, his widow married Edward Daily. Evelynne Mess Daily died on January 9, 2003, at the age of 100.

== Career ==
Mess began his artistic career in 1921 as an artist in Indianapolis, where he established a commercial art business with his younger brother, Gordon, and continued his art training in the evening at the Herron Art Institute. In 1927 Mess founded the Circle Art Academy with his wife, Evelynne, and his brother, Gordon. The Mess brothers served as directors and art instructors at the academy. Evelynne Mess taught at the academy during its first year of operation before focusing fulltime on etching and printmaking. After the trio closed the school in 1932, the brothers organized the Circle Engraving Company, where George worked as the head of its commercial art department for the next five years.

During the summer of 1929 George and Evelynne Mess took a break from their work in Indianapolis to study art at the École des Beaux-Arts at Fontainebleau, France. At the end of the summer they spent additional time traveling and sketching in France, Switzerland, and Italy. After their return the United States, Mess resumed his work at the Circle Art Academy and continued to paint on weekends and in the evenings. Mess's wife, a master etcher, introduced him to the medium of etching and taught him the fundamentals. She later assisted him with the technical aspects of his etching and printing work due to his busy schedule as an art teacher and commercial artist. In 1931 he was awarded a fellowship from The Louis Comfort Tiffany Foundation to study in New York.

Mess exhibited his art at international exhibitions in Stockholm, Paris, and Rome, as well as at national shows at venue such as the Hoosier Salon, the Herron Art Institute, the Indiana State Fair, the Indiana Artists Club, the Indiana Society of Printmakers, the Society of American Etchers, the Carnegie Museums of Pittsburgh, the Art Institute of Chicago, the Dayton Art Institute, the Metropolitan Museum of Art, and the Pennsylvania Academy of Fine Arts, among others. Mess's Winter in Indianapolis was part of an international exhibition at the Carnegie Institute in Pittsburgh, Pennsylvania, in 1930. (Mess was one of only forty-eight American painters whose work was included in the exhibition.) Metamora won a prize in 1931 at the Indiana Art Association's annual exhibition, the same year that Indianapolis in Snow and Brookside Bridge were exhibited at the Cincinnati Art Museum's 38th Annual Exhibition of American Art. In 1933 Mess and nineteen other Indiana artists exhibited their art at the Century of Progress International Exhibition in Chicago, Illinois. The following year he had a solo exhibition at the Herron Art Institute.

In 1937 Mess and his wife moved to Chicago, where he took a job supervising the reproduction of artwork for several magazines that included Esquire, Coronet, and Apparel Arts. The Messes returned to Indianapolis in 1940, a year after he was diagnosed with cancer.

Despite his ill health, Mess and his wife continued to make their living teaching and selling their art. In addition to establishing a weekend retreat on a farm they purchased in Brown County, Indiana, in 1941, the couple spent three months during the summer of 1944 teaching printing to students attending the Old Mill Art School, a school that their friends and fellow artists, Margaret and Wayman Elbridge Adams, had established on their property in the Adirondack Mountains near Elizabethtown, New York.

Due to his ongoing ill health, Mess occasionally taught at the Indianapolis Art League and at the Herron Art Institute. In 1949 he became a part-time instructor of art at Indiana University's campus in Indianapolis (the present-day Indiana University – Purdue University Indianapolis), a position he retained until his death in 1962.

== Death and legacy ==
George Mess died in Indianapolis on June 24, 1962, after suffering nearly two decades of ill health.

Mess began his career as a commercial artist and art educator; however, he became nationally known for his work as a printmaker and painter. In addition, Mess and his wife, Evelynne Mess Daily, were prominent members of the Indianapolis and Brown County, Indiana, arts communities. Trained as a painter, producing mostly Impressionist-style landscapes, he was especially known for his aquatint etchings and prints of rural scenes in the modern styles of the 1930s and 1940s.

== Honors and tributes ==
During his lifetime, Mess was the recipient of several prizes and awards for his art from the Hoosier Salon, the Herron Art Institute, the Indiana State Fair, and the Indiana Artists Club.

== Selected works ==
Mess's work is represented in the permanent collections of the Smithsonian American Art Museum, the Metropolitan Museum of Art, the Indianapolis Museum of Art, the Indiana Historical Society, and Minnetrista, among others. His illustrations appear in several publications such as Hoosier City (1943) and Living in Indiana (1946).

At the Smithsonian American Art Museum:

- Ever So Humble
- Winter Moonlight
- Wishing Gate

At the Indianapolis Museum of Art:

- Ed Luckey's Farm (1937)
- Metamora (1935)
- Southern Oak (1936)

At the Indiana Historical Society:

- Christmas Eve (1936)
- Self Portrait (1940)
- Snow Bound (1936)
- The Handy Pump (1943)

At Minnetrista:

- New Dawn
