= Rowell House =

Historic house in Massachusetts

- U.S. National Register of Historic Places
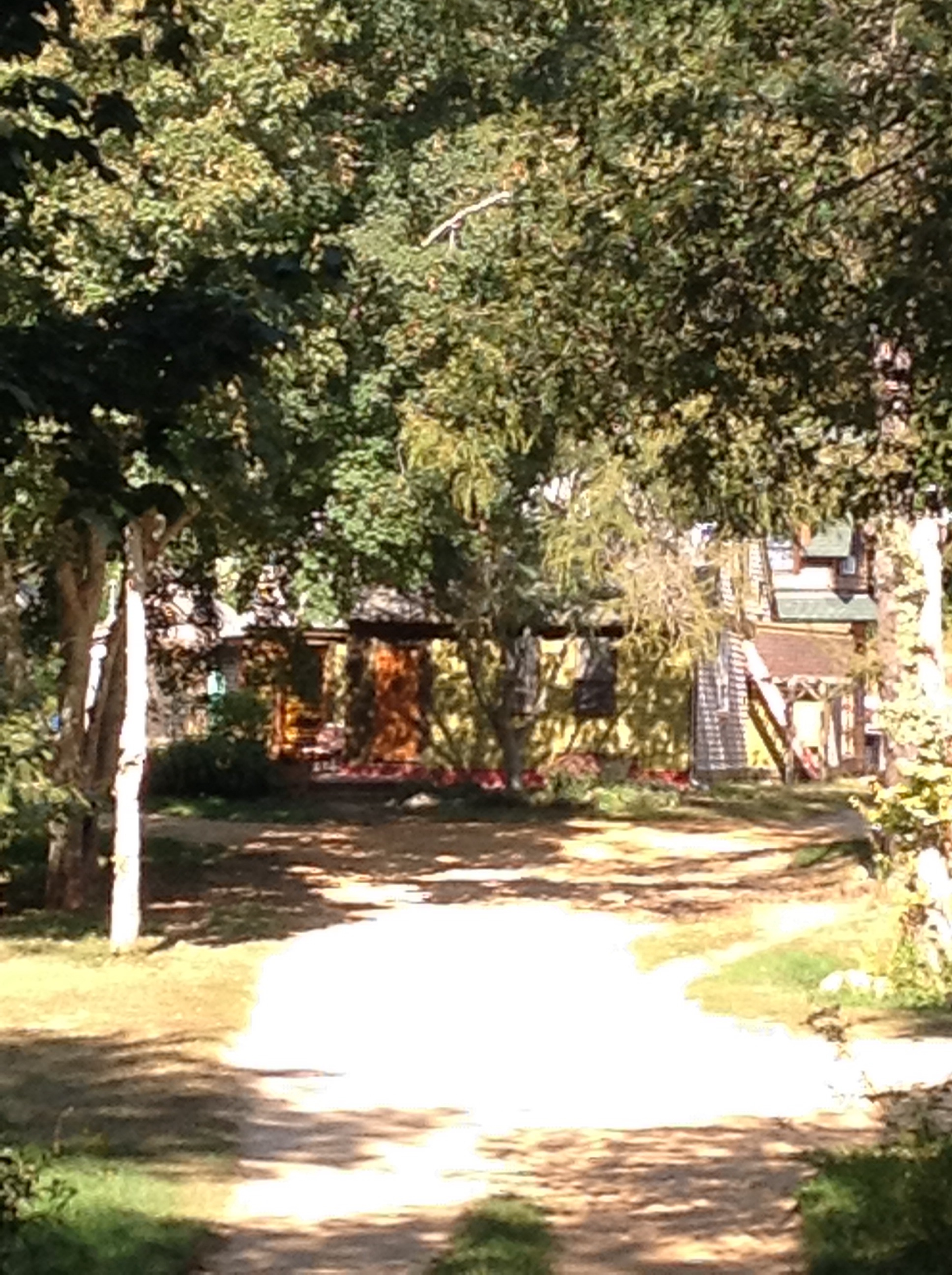

- Location within Cape Cod Location within Massachusetts Location within the United States
- Location: 590 Gull Pond Road, Wellfleet, Massachusetts
- Coordinates: 41°57′20″N 70°0′47″W
- Built: 1731
- Architectural style: Colonial
- NRHP reference No.: 88001458
- Added to NRHP: September 1, 1988

The Rowell House is a historic house in Wellfleet, Massachusetts. A small 1.5-story Cape-style house, it was probably built around 1713, and is one of the oldest houses in Wellfleet. It has three bays, with a large chimney behind the leftmost bay. The house was owned early in the 19th century by the Rowell sisters. And then passed onto the next generation.

The house was listed on the National Register of Historic Places in 1988.

== See also ==
- National Register of Historic Places listings in Barnstable County, Massachusetts
