= Andrew Raftery =

American painter (born 1962)

Andrew Stein Raftery
- Born: May 22, 1962 (age 63); Goldsboro, North Carolina, U.S.
- Education: Boston University (BFA); Yale University (MFA)
- Known for: Burin engraving, teaching

Andrew Stein Raftery (born May 22, 1962, in Goldsboro, North Carolina) is an American artist and educator, known for his paintings, burin engravings, and drawings on fictional and autobiographical narratives of contemporary American life.

== Biography ==
In 1984, Raftery earned his B.F.A. degree in painting from Boston University, and took his first intaglio printing class with Sidney Jack Hurwitz. In 1988, he completed his M.F.A. degree in printmaking from Yale University. He is a professor at Rhode Island School of Design (RISD) teaching in the printmaking and painting departments, since 1991. He credits Stanley William Hayter and his proteges in Atelier 17 as an influence, and the collection of Charles Randall Dean as a guide, before its acquisition by the Library of Congress.

In 2004, Raftery's work was featured in Jonathan Weinberg’s book, Male Desire: The Homoerotic in American Art. Raftery helped contribute to the 2009 publishing of the RISD Museum exhibition catalog, The Brilliant Line: Following the Early Modern Engraver, 1480-1650 alongside Emily J. Peters and Evelyn Lincoln (of Brown University). His major works in this period were the portfolios Suit Shopping (2000–2002) and Open House (2004–2008).

In 2009, he was elected as an academic member of the National Academy in New York City. From that year until 2012, Raftery assisted in research at the Metropolitan Museum of Art on the wear of engraved copper plates through printing, necessary for more confident dating of historical prints; this required using a traditional hammered copper plate and lozenge-shaped burin for the first time in his career.

== Awards ==
Raftery has earned many awards including the Fritz Eichenberg Fellowship in printmaking, narrative engraving project from the Rhode Island State Council for the arts in 2001, Louis Comfort Tiffany Award in 2003, the American Academy of Arts and Letters Purchase Award in 2006, John R. Frazier Award for excellence in teaching from RISD in 2007 and the John Simon Guggenheim Memorial Foundation Fellowship in 2008.

== Collections ==
His work is included in the public art collections of the select following;

- Addison Gallery of American Art at Phillips Academy Andover, in Andover, Massachusetts, U.S.;
- British Museum, London, United Kingdom;
- Cleveland Museum of Art, Cleveland, Ohio, U.S.;
- Fleming Museum of Art at the University of Vermont, Burlington, Vermont, U.S.;
- Fogg Museum at Harvard University, Cambridge, Massachusetts, U.S.;
- Metropolitan Museum of Art, New York, New York, U.S.;
- Minneapolis Institute of Arts, Minneapolis, Minnesota, U.S.;
- Museum of Fine Arts, Boston, Boston, Massachusetts, U.S.;
- New York Public Library, New York, New York, U.S.;
- Princeton University Art Museum, Princeton, New Jersey, U.S.;
- Rhode Island School of Design Museum, Providence, Rhode Island, U.S.;
- Spencer Museum of Art at the University of Kansas, Lawrence, Kansas, U.S.;
- Whitney Museum of American Art, New York, New York, U.S.;
- Yale University Art Gallery, New Haven, Connecticut, U.S.;
