= Adam Helms =

American contemporary artist (born 1974)

- Born: 1974 (age 51–52); Tucson, Arizona, USA
- Education: Rhode Island School of Design; Yale University

Adam Helms (born 1974) is an American contemporary artist who lives and works in Brooklyn, New York City. His work encompasses drawing, printmaking, sculpture, assemblage, and archival research, often involving the iconography of marginalized social and political groups and the American frontier. Helms's work has been exhibited at the New Museum of Contemporary Art (New York), MoMA PS1 (New York), the Solomon R. Guggenheim Museum (New York), Walker Art Center (Minneapolis), and Museum of Contemporary Art Denver (Denver).

He is the recipient of the Louis Comfort Tiffany Foundation Award and the Rema Hort Mann Foundation Visual Art Grant Award, and has been an artist in residence at the Chinati Foundation in Marfa, Texas.

== Life ==
Adam Helms was born in 1974 in Tucson, Arizona. He received a BFA at the Rhode Island School of Design in 1997 and an MFA from Yale University in 2004.

== Work ==
Adam Helms, "Untitled (48 Portraits, 2010)," 2010, charcoal on paper (view of installation at Marianne Boesky Gallery).

Helms's work focuses on the iconography of marginalized political and social groups, and employs imagery from a range of sources: pixelated JPEGs of Chechen rebels, tintype portraits of Confederate and Union soldiers, photographs of black metal bands. Helms mines online archives and popular print material to trace connections between the uniforms, heraldry, and physical affectations of these groups, which are often the primary means of distinguishing between them. In his work, Helms explores how these persistent, unnervingly homogenous representations of violence and trauma are processed into visual artifacts. Helms's work has been exhibited widely and internationally, and is featured in Vitamin D2: New Perspectives in Drawing (Phaidon), among other publications.

Helms is interested in visual archetypes that are employed in various historical periods, by diverse populations, in service of seemingly divergent ideological ends. “I think of myself as an ethnographer,” Helms says. “I am interested in the ethos of violence, the romanticization of extremist ideology, and linking issues from our political past with contemporary events.” Helms often depicts masked figures, using double-sided silkscreen portraits on vellum with faces obscured by pools of black ink resembling a balaclava or hood. One persistent touchstone is painter Gerhard Richter’s 48 Portraits (1971–72), which memorializes great writers, poets, and composers using images taken from an encyclopedia. Helms’s Untitled (48 Portraits, 2010) (2010) depicts anonymous militiamen and combatants—the distortion of the original, online source images evident in the works—who exist on the fringes of society and represent the shadow of the rational order on view in Richter’s work.

Helms’s work takes the form of large-scale charcoal drawings depicting mythic landscapes (which evoke foundational and yet generic cultural narratives); screen prints and drawings on paper and other media; various installations; and light-box assemblages consisting of grid-like arrangements of archival images. Author William S. Smith noted these “fields of comparison” suggest that “representations of the modern world’s extreme fringes—images that we might imagine to break the mold of normal discourse—actually follow some of the most deeply ingrained conventions,” in a monograph on Helms's work. “Helms’s photographic archives reveal how cultures under duress consistently fall back on tropes and archetypes to find meaningful forms.”

Later in his career, Helms would move away from overtly figurative work and experiment with mounting various kinds of paper and felt to panels. These works often incorporate visual materials found in print publications and on the Internet, but they take the form of heralds invented by the artist—imagistic memes with a cryptic symbolism and uncanny quality. Helms considers the drawings on felt to be “zombies”: emblems and visual identities that originally appeared in the 1960s–90s in advertisements in publications such as LIFE and Soldier of Fortune, often photojournalistic images of soldiers or portraits of women, and decontextualized and “reanimated” by the artist. Helms's work is included in the collections of the Walker Art Center, the Whitney Museum of American Art, the Solomon R. Guggenheim Museum, the Caldic Collection, and the Dakis Joannou Collection.

== Selected exhibitions ==
=== 2005 ===
- "Brother's Keeper", Sister, Los Angeles (solo exhibition)
- "You Are Here", Ballroom Marfa, Marfa, Texas
- "Greater New York 2005", PS1 Contemporary Art Center, New York

=== 2006 ===
- "View (Eleven): Upstate", Mary Boone Gallery, New York
- "Ordinary Culture: Heikes/Helms/McMillian", Walker Art Center, Minneapolis

=== 2007 ===
- "Hinterland", Marianne Boesky Gallery, New York (solo exhibition)
- "Rising Down", Sister, Los Angeles (solo exhibition)
- "Looking Back: The White Columns Annual", White Columns, New York
- "Every Revolution Is a Roll of the Dice", Ballroom Marfa, Marfa, Texas
- "Dream and Trauma: Works from the Dakis Joannou Collection, Athens", Kunsthalle and Museum Moderner Kunst Stiftung Ludwig Wien, Vienna
- "Just Kick It Till It Breaks", The Kitchen, New York

=== 2008 ===
- "Adam Helms", Museum of Contemporary Art Denver, Denver, Colorado (solo exhibition)

=== 2009 ===
- "Under Western Eyes", Kathryn Brennan Gallery, Los Angeles (solo exhibition)

=== 2010 ===
- "Without Name", Marianne Boesky Gallery, New York (solo exhibition)
- "A.D.D. Attention Deficit Disorder", Center of Contemporary Art at Palazzo Lucarini Contemporary, Trevi, Italy
- "Natural Renditions", Marlborough Gallery, New York
- "Skin Fruit: The Dakis Joannou Collection", New Museum of Contemporary Art, New York
- "Haunted: Contemporary Photography/Video/Performance", Solomon R. Guggenheim Museum, New York

=== 2011 ===
- "Blind Lion", Grimm Gallery, Amsterdam (solo exhibition)
- "Heel Gezellig", Grimm Gallery, Amsterdam
- "Second Nature: Contemporary Landscapes from the MFAH Collection", Museum of Fine Arts, Houston

=== 2012 ===
- "Campaign", C24 Gallery, New York

=== 2013 ===
- "Pathos Formula", Almine Rech Gallery, Brussels (solo exhibition)
- "Traces of Life", Wentrup Gallery, Berlin
