= Evelynne Mess Daily =

American artist and art educator

- Born: January 8, 1903; Indianapolis, Indiana, US
- Died: January 9, 2003 (aged 100); Indianapolis, Indiana, US
- Resting place: Crown Hill Cemetery and Arboretum, Section 39, Lot 109
- Known for: Etching and printmaking

Evelynne Bernloehr Mess Daily (January 8, 1903 – January 9, 2003) was an American etcher, printmaker, painter, illustrator, and art educator from Indianapolis, Indiana, who founded the Indiana Society of Printmakers in 1934. Along with her first husband and fellow artist, George Joseph Mess, she was active in the Indianapolis and Brown County, Indiana, arts community. Awarded an honorary doctor of philosophy degree from Colorado State Christian College in 1973, and a recipient of a Sagamore of the Wabash award in 1987, she was also a past president of the Indiana Federation of Art Clubs and a former secretary of the Indiana Artists Club. Her work is represented in several permanent collections that included the Library of Congress, the Indianapolis Museum of Art, the Indiana State Museum, the Indiana State Library, the Indiana University Art Museum, the Richmond Art Museum, DePauw University, and the Philadelphia Museum of Art.

== Early life and education ==
Evelynne Charlien Bernloehr was born on January 8, 1903, in Indianapolis, Indiana, to John A. and Anna B. Bernloehr. John Bernloehr, a jeweler of German ancestry, was a partner with his brother in an Indianapolis jewelry business. Anna Bernloehr was a homemaker of Swiss heritage whose family operated a local bakery. John and Anna Bernloehr enjoyed music and the arts. The Bernloehr family included six children (three girls and three boys), two of whom died in childhood. Bernloehr's surviving siblings were Lenora, Wilmer, and John. As a member of a musical family, she learned to play piano and several stringed instruments, including banjo, mandolin, and guitar, but she developed a strong interest in drawing at an early age and aspired to become an artist.

Bernloehr attended Indianapolis's public schools. At the age of twelve she received a scholarship to join Indianapolis's John Herron Art Institute's Saturday-morning art classes for children. (The Herron Art Institute was a forerunner to the Indianapolis Museum of Art.) Bernloehr continued to attend weekend classes at Herron through her high school years at Indianapolis's Arsenal Technical High School, where she studied with illustrator Frederick Polley. She also studied for a year at Indianapolis's Shortridge High School from 1920 to 1921 before enrolling at Butler University, but left after a year to continue her studies at Herron. Bernloehr spent the next two years (1923–24) as a full-time student at Herron, where she studied under William Forsyth and Clifton Wheeler, and taught children's art classes in order to earn a teaching certificate in art. She also attended Wayman Adams School of Portrait Painting in New York, the Chicago Art Institute, and École des Beaux Arts.

== Marriage and family ==
Bernloehr met her first husband, George Joseph Mess, while assisting with evening art classes at the Herron in 1925. Mess was a commercial artist and one of the students in William Forsyth's drawing class. Bernloehr and Mess were married on April 28, 1925, at her family's home in Indianapolis. Following their marriage the couple set up an art studio in the living room of their home in suburban Broad Ripple. George Mess died in 1962, after suffering nearly two decades of ill health. The couple had no children.

“Marriage is wonderful if the persons involved are truly partners, especially if they work together in a field they both love, as George and I did,” Evelynne said of her husband, George. “We shared everything we did in art and complemented each other.”

Evelynne Mess met her second husband, Edward Daily, a widower and Eli Lilly and Company retiree, in 1968. They were married the following year and resided in his Brown County, Indiana, home near Nashville. Edward Daily died in 1974.

== Career ==
After graduating from the Herron Institute of Art in 1924, Bernloehr took a job teaching art at Emmerich Manual High School in Indianapolis, but decided not to renew her teaching contract the following year. In order to maintain her contacts in the Indianapolis arts community, she assisted with the evening art classes at Herron. After her marriage to George Mess in 1925 she worked on her art in their home studio. It was unusual, in that time, for a woman to continue her career after marriage, but Evelynne Bernloehr Mess Daily loved her art too much to give it up.

Evelynne Bernloehr Mess Daily's artistic interest always lied with etching, inspired by the newspaper drawings of Frederick Polley, who taught her art at Arsenal Technical High School. At the time, however, there were no course offerings in etching. Bernloehr taught herself the art, learning from the pages of the Encyclopædia Britannica.

Along with her husband, George, and brother-in-law, Gordon Mess, the trio founded the Circle Art Academy, a commercial art school in Indianapolis in 1927. Although the academy remained in operation until 1932, Evelynne only taught during its first year of operation. Afterwards, she focused fulltime on etching and printmaking.

Seeking inspiration and additional art instruction, Evelynne and George Mess spent the summer of 1929 studying at the École des Beaux-Arts at Fontainebleau, France, where she was especially interested in training with an experienced graveur, Achile Ouvré. At the end of the summer the couple spent additional time traveling and sketching in France, Switzerland, and Italy, before their return to the United States in the fall.

After the trip Mess resumed her work as an etcher and printmaker. During these early years she created etchings from many of the sketches she had made in Europe, although her preferred method was to draw designs directly onto copper plates and use fast-acting acids to score the freehand work. By 1932 she had introduced her husband, George, a trained painter, the medium of etching and taught him the basics of printmaking. While George remained heavily involved in directing and teaching at the Circle Art Academy during the day, Evelynne took over the tedious work of producing prints from his artwork. She also worked as a substitute teacher at Indianapolis schools and during the 1930s became active in several art-related clubs.

Mess was a member of the Indiana Artists Club, the Indiana Federation of Art Clubs, and the art department of the Indianapolis Woman's Department Club, where she served for several years as chairwoman of its exhibits committee. In 1934 Mess founded the Indiana Society of Printmakers and also organized a print show for the Woman's Department Club. She also took on leadership roles as a president of the Indiana Federation of Art Clubs and as secretary of the Indiana Artists Club. In addition, Mess became involved in the Hoosier Salon and the National Society of Arts and Letters, as well as the Brown County Art Gallery and the Brown County Art Guild.

In 1937 the Evelynne and George Mess moved to Chicago, Illinois, where he took a job supervising the reproduction of artwork for several magazines and she took classes at the Art Institute of Chicago. The couple returned to Indianapolis in 1940 after he was diagnosed with cancer. In addition to maintaining a home/art studio in Indianapolis, the Messes purchased a 40-acre (16-hectare) farm outside of Nashville in Brown County, Indiana, in 1941. Their rustic weekend retreat was called Oxbow Acres. They also spent three months during the summer of 1944 teaching printing to students attending the Old Mill Art School, a summer school that their friends and fellow artists, Margaret and Wayman Elbridge Adams, had established on property in the Adirondack Mountains near Elizabethtown, New York.

To supplement their household income, Evelynne taught at Ladywood School in Indianapolis in 1942–43 and worked as a substitute teacher for the Indianapolis Public Schools. During the 1950s and 1960s she also taught at the Indianapolis Art League. George Mess, who suffered from cancer for more than twenty years, died from the illness on June 24, 1962. Overwhelmed with grief, Mess spent her first year of widowhood organizing a memorial exhibition of his art.

In 1967 Mess realized a longtime dream to open a summer art school at Oxbow Acres, her retreat in Brown County, Indiana. Although the school emphasized printmaking, Mess and occasional guest instructors also offered instruction in painting, drawing, silk screening, and metal engraving, among other arts. The following year she met her second husband, Edward R. Daily, at a Brown County Art Gallery show. They married in 1969 and continued to reside in Brown County; however, after Daily's death in 1974, she returned to the home/art studio in Indianapolis that she had shared with her first husband, George. Evelynne Mess Daily closed her art school and sold Oxbow Acres in 1980.

Mess Daily exhibited her etchings and other art at national and international exhibitions held at the Indiana State Fair, the Indiana Artists Club, the Indiana Federation of Arts Clubs, the Hoosier Salon, the Herron Art Institute, the Indiana Society of Printmakers, the Brown County Art Association, the Society of American Etchers, the Los Angeles County Museum of Art, the Cincinnati Art Museum, and the Pennsylvania Academy of Fine Arts, among other venues.

== Later years ==
She suffered from ill health in her later years, undergoing an operation for retinal detachment. In addition, acid damage to her lungs forced her to give up printmaking for two decades. Despite these setbacks Mess Daily continued to exhibit her artwork. Water Fantasy, her rendering of a mermaid, was displayed at the Cincinnati Art Museum in 1990.

== Death and legacy ==
Evelynne Mess Daily died in Indianapolis on January 9, 2003, at age 100. One day after her 100th birthday. Her remains are interred at Crown Hill Cemetery in Indianapolis.

Evelynne Mess Daily and her first husband, George Joseph Mess, were well known in the Indianapolis and Brown County, Indiana, art communities. Mess Daily is best known as an etcher and printmaker, although she also worked a painter and illustrator. In addition to art, her major legacy was supporting the development and careers of other artists and printmakers, including her husband, and as the founder of the Indiana Society of Printmakers in 1934.

== Honors and tributes ==
- Awarded an honorary doctor of philosophy degree from Colorado State Christian College in 1973
- Recipient of a leadership award from the Indiana Federation of Art Clubs in 1978
- Named a Sagamore of the Wabash in 1987

== Selected works ==
Mess Daily's artwork is represented in several permanent collections. These include the Library of Congress, Washington, D.C.; the Indianapolis Museum of Art, Indianapolis; the Indiana State Museum, Indianapolis; the Indiana University Art Museum, Bloomington; the Richmond Art Museum, Richmond, Indiana; the Art Museum of Greater Lafayette, Lafayette, Indiana; the Philadelphia Museum of Art, Philadelphia, Pennsylvania; DePauw University, Greencastle, Indiana; and the Indiana State Library, Indianapolis.

At the Library of Congress:

- Adirondack Trail (1946)

At the Indianapolis Museum of Art:

- Old Montmartre, Paris (1929)
- Street Musicians in France (1929)
- Water Fantasy, Nymph (1931)
- Toadstools (1946)
- Barnyard Controversy (1949)
- Evelynne's Country Kitchen (1973)
