= Pond Hill School =

- U.S. National Register of Historic Places
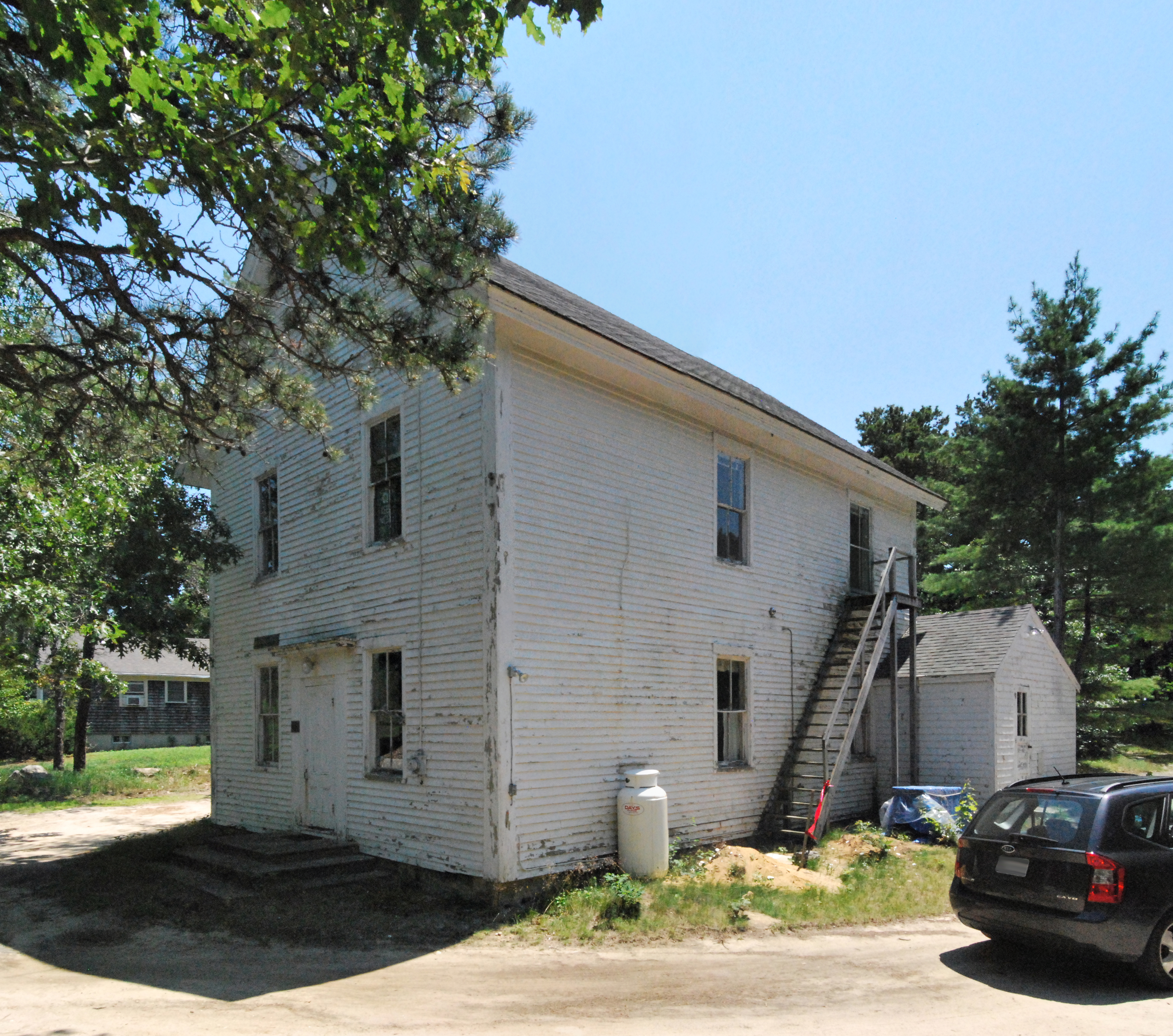
- Pond Hill School in 2011

- Location within Cape Cod Location within Massachusetts Location within the United States
- Location: 65 Old Paine Hollow Road, Wellfleet, Massachusetts
- Coordinates: 41°55′1″N 69°59′57″W
- Area: 1.3 acres (0.53 ha)
- Built: 1857
- Architectural style: Greek Revival
- NRHP reference No.: 89000222
- Added to NRHP: March 23, 1989

The Pond Hill School is a historic school building at 65 Old Paine Hollow Road (old Route 6) in Wellfleet, Massachusetts, United States. Built in 1857, it is the last of Wellfleet's 19th-century district schools to be built, and to survive relatively intact. The school is now home to the South Wellfleet Neighborhood Association. The building was listed on the National Register of Historic Places in 1989.

== Description and history ==
The Pond Hill School is located west of the central portion of the village of South Wellfleet, located between United States Route 6 and Old Paine Hollow Road (a former alignment of US 6). It is a two-story wood frame structure, with a gabled roof and clapboarded exterior. A single-story addition with a shed roof extends along its southern side. The main entrance is on the north side, with sash windows on either side. The door frame has a modest Greek Revival character, with wide frieze and a simple cornice above. The interior consists of large chambers on each floor, with small service rooms on the north side. Originally used as classrooms, the upper floor was modified to house a library in 1912. The addition houses modern amenities such as bathrooms.

The school was built in 1857, and was the last of Wellfleet's twelve district schoolhouses to be built, replacing an older single-story one-room structure serving the town's third district. The building served as a schoolhouse until 1880, and was purchased six years later by the South Wellfleet Ladies Social Union. In 1945, with that organization in decline, the property was given to a neighborhood association, which now owns and maintains the building.

== See also ==
- National Register of Historic Places listings in Barnstable County, Massachusetts
