= Townsend House (Wellfleet, Massachusetts) =

Historic house in Massachusetts, United States

- U.S. National Register of Historic Places
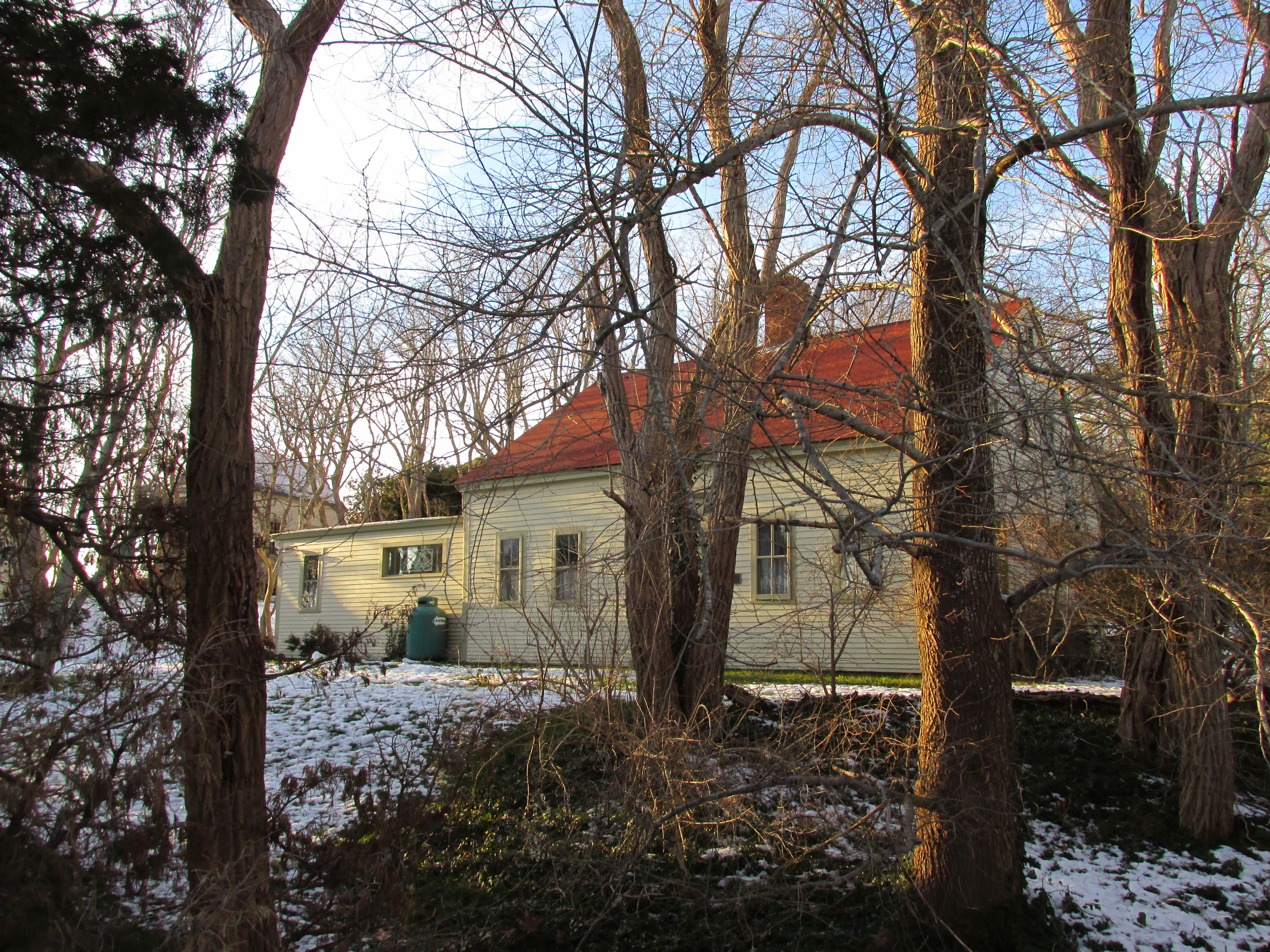
- Townsend House

- Location within Cape Cod Location within Massachusetts Location within the United States
- Location: Wellfleet, Massachusetts
- Coordinates: 41°54′42″N 70°0′38″W
- Built: 1804
- NRHP reference No.: 98000542
- Added to NRHP: May 20, 1998

The Townsend House is a historic house at 290 Paine Hollow Road in Wellfleet, Massachusetts. The 1 1/2-story full Cape style wood-frame house was built in 1804, probably by Doctor James Townsend, whose descendants owned the house well into the 20th century. The most notable resident was Samuel Campbell, an English engineer who worked with Guglielmo Marconi on the transatlantic wireless facilities in Wellfleet. The house is notable as a particularly little-altered example of the style, with details typically only found in houses of wealthier owners. The house was listed on the National Register of Historic Places in 1998.

== Description and history ==
The Townsend house is set on the southwest side of Paine Hollow Road, between it and Blackfish Creek, a tidal waterway on Wellfleet's west coast. It is a 1 1/2-story wood-frame structure, five bays wide, with a central chimney, side-gable roof, and brick foundation. It is clapboarded on two sides and shingled on the other two. Its entrance is centered on the southeaster facade, and is flanked by pilasters and topped by a transom window and cornice. The interior has a typical center-chimney configuration, with narrow staircases in front of and behind the chimney, chambers to either side, and the kitchen occupying most of the rear, with small chambers in the rear corners. The interior ceilings are higher than those typically found in period Capes, and the front stairs are wider than usual, both signs of the owner's wealth and status. A single-story flat-roofed ell, built in 1988 extends to the southwest. The interior has retained much of its original woodwork and hardware. The property includes two 19th-century outbuildings, a privy and a shed that once served as a summer kitchen.

The house was built in 1804 by James Townsend, a local doctor who had just married. Townsend died in 1812, and his wife remarried and moved away, but the house remained within the family until the 20th century. In the early 20th century it was purchased by Samuel Campbell, an employee of Guglielmo Marconi who was employed at the Marconi station located in South Wellfleet.

== See also ==
- National Register of Historic Places listings in Barnstable County, Massachusetts
