= John Newcomb House =

Historic house in Massachusetts, United States

- U.S. National Register of Historic Places
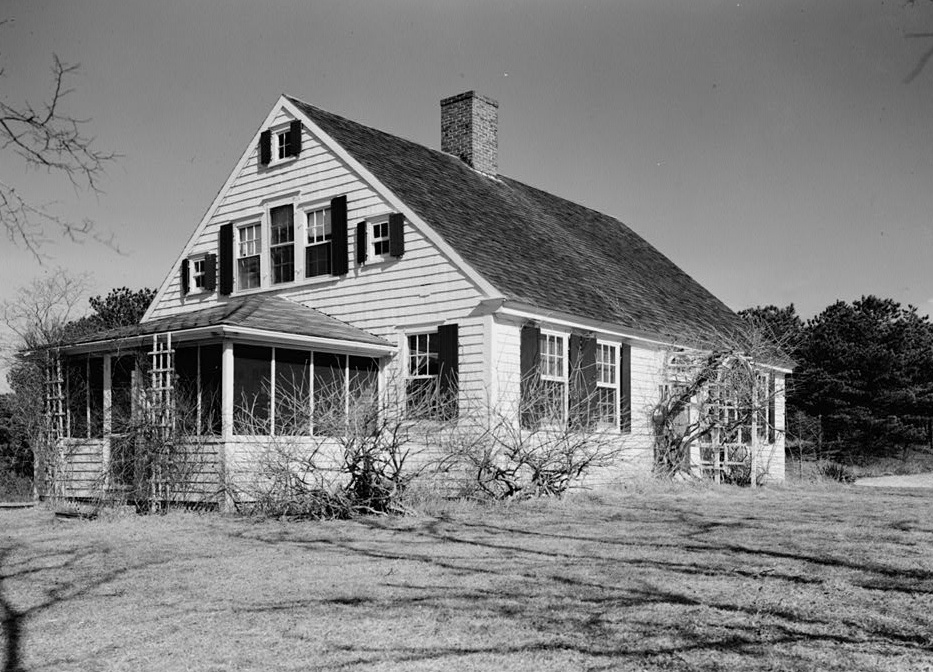
- HABS photo c. 1930s

- Location within Cape Cod Location within Massachusetts Location within the United States
- Nearest city: Wellfleet, Massachusetts
- Coordinates: 41°57′53″N 70°00′23″W
- Built: 1829
- Architect: John Young Newcomb
- Architectural style: Federal
- NRHP reference No.: 88001457
- Added to NRHP: September 15, 1988

The John Newcomb House is a historic house in Wellfleet, Massachusetts. It is best known as the house described by Henry David Thoreau in the chapter on the "House of the Wellfleet Oysterman" in his 1865 book, Cape Cod. The house is located in Cape Cod National Seashore, on a sandy lane off Gull Pond Road to the east of Williams Pond in northern Wellfleet. The Cape style house is presumed to have been built by John Y. Newcomb (born 1762).

The house was listed on the National Register of Historic Places in 1988.

== See also ==
- National Register of Historic Places listings in Barnstable County, Massachusetts
