= Nicole Cherubini =

American visual artist and sculptor

- Born: 1970 (age 55–56)
- Education: Rhode Island School of Design, New York University Institute of Fine Arts
- Known for: sculptor

Nicole Cherubini (born 1970, Boston, MA) is an American visual artist and sculptor working primarily in ceramics. She lives and works in New York.

== Early life and education ==
Nicole Cherubini was born in Boston, Massachusetts, in 1970. She graduated from the Rhode Island School of Design in 1993 with a Bachelor of Fine Arts in Ceramics, and continued her education at New York University Institute of Fine Arts, earning her Master of Fine Arts in Visual Arts in 1998. Cherubini attended the Skowhegan School of Painting and Sculpture in 2002.

== Work ==
Working largely in ceramic sculptures and mixed media installations, Cherubini's work comments on ceramics as a language that has been associated with craft narratives and its cultural relation to gender and functionality.

In 2023, the Tufts University Art Galleries, Somerville and Boston, featured Nicole Cherubini's large-scale installation as part of re:imagining collections, a four-person exhibition that invited artists to interact with the university's art collection and reinterpret it in under a new light. Other artists in the show were Ali Cherri, NIC Kay, and SANGREE.

Cherubini's work is included in Every Sound Is a Shape of Time: Selections from PAMM's Collection, organized by the Pérez Art Museum Miami in 2024. The exhibition encompasses nearly thirty years of collecting practices, and retells the museum's history to current audiences. For instance, Nicole Cherubini held a solo show at PAMM in 2014, in which she grounded and framed her ceramics work on a feminist practice.

She has presented solo exhibitions at Samsøñ (Boston, MA), Pérez Art Museum Miami (Miami, FL), the Santa Monica Museum of Art (Los Angeles, CA), the Institute of Contemporary Art (Philadelphia, PA), Tracy Williams (NY), the Nassau County Museum of Art (Roslyn Harbor, NY), the Jersey City Museum (Jersey City, NJ), and La Panadería (Mexico City, MX).

Her works have been included in group exhibitions at institutions including MoMA PS1 (Long Island City, NY), the Cranbrook Art Museum (Bloomfield Hills, MI), The Tang Teaching Museum and Art Gallery (Saratoga, NY), the Museum of Fine Arts (Boston, MA), the Institute of Contemporary Art (Boston, MA), the Boston University Art Gallery (Boston, MA), the Boston Center for the Arts (Boston, MA), Permanenten: The West Norway Museum of Decorative Art (Bergen, NO), the Rhode Island School of Design Museum (Providence, RI), and the Sculpture Center (Long Island City, NY).

Her work has received press from Art in America, Artforum, ARTnews, BOMB Magazine, The New York Times, The New Yorker; also featured on The Pot Book by Edmund De Waal, and Breaking The Mold new approaches to ceramics by black god publishing.

== Collections ==
Her work is in the public collections at the Massachusetts Institute of Technology, Cambridge, Massachusetts; the Museum of Fine Arts, Boston, Massachusetts; the Institute of Contemporary Art, Boston, Massachusetts; the Pérez Art Museum Miami, Florida; The Tang Teaching Museum and Art Gallery at Skidmore College, Saratoga, New York; the Progressive Collection, Mayfield Village, Ohio; and the Tishman Speyer Collection, New York.

== Awards ==
Cherubini is a recipient of the National Endowment for the Arts (NEA) Travel Grant to Mexico (1994), a New England Foundation for the Arts Fellowship in Sculpture (1995), a Watershed Center for Ceramic Arts Residency Fellowship (1997), the Jack Goodman Award for Art and Technology at New York University (1998), the Greenwich House Pottery Artist Residency (Summer-Fall 2000), a Residency at Henry Street Settlement in New York, NY (2002), the Emerge Artist Development Program, Aljira Center for Contemporary Art, New Jersey, NJ (2002), the Louis Comfort Tiffany Foundation Award (2007) and an Art Matters Foundation Grant for travel and work in Mexico (2008–09).

== Representation ==
She is represented by SEPTEMBER Gallery in Hudson, NY.

== Sources ==
- Official website
- Curriculum vitae
- "Dirt on Delight: Impulses That Form Clay (July 11, 2009 – November 29, 2009)". Walker Art Center.
- 2014 Bomb Magazine interview of Nicole Cherubini by Sarah Braman
- "Art in America" review by Faye Hirsch
- "Artforum" Top Ten
- "Artnews" CLAYTIME! CERAMICS FINDS ITS PLACE IN THE ART-WORLD MAINSTREAM by Lilly Wei
- "NY Times" Spray!: Polly Apfelbaum/Nicole Cherubini Studiowork by ROBERTA SMITH
- "The New Yorker" DAVIS, CHERUBINI
- "Big Red & Shiny" Review of golden specific at Samsøñ, Nicole Cherubini
- "Daily Serving" Review of golden specific at Samsøñ, Nicole Cherubini
- "artnet" GOTHAM ART & THEATER by Elisabeth Kley
