= Saunders–Paine House =

Historic house in Massachusetts, United States

- U.S. National Register of Historic Places
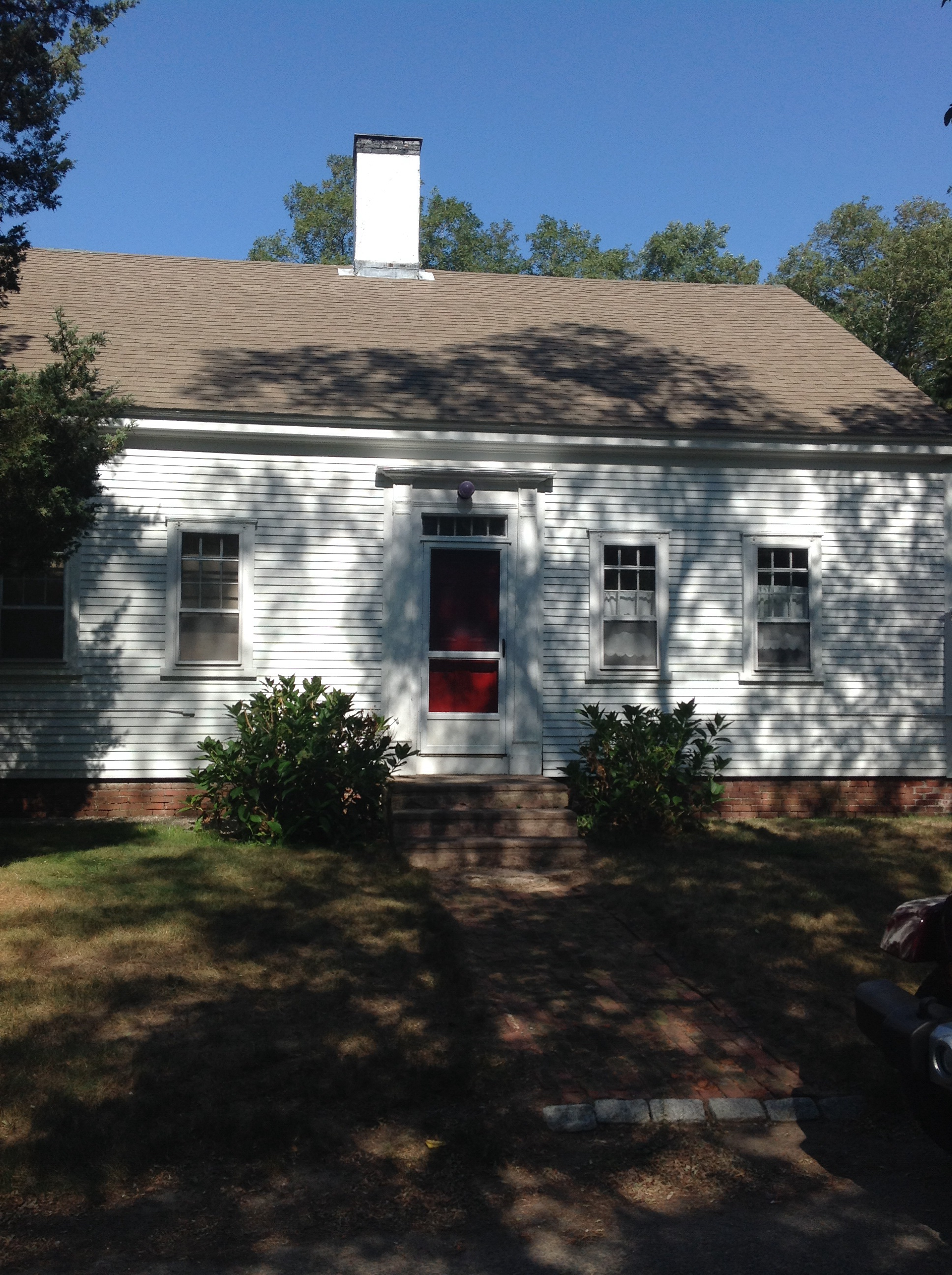

- Location within Cape Cod Location within Massachusetts Location within the United States
- Location: Wellfleet, Massachusetts
- Coordinates: 41°54′46″N 70°0′34″W
- Built: 1830
- NRHP reference No.: 98000474
- Added to NRHP: May 20, 1998

The Saunders–Paine House is a historic house at 260 Paine Hollow Road in Wellfleet, Massachusetts. This 1 1/2-story Federal style Cape was built c. 1830, and is a well-preserved local example of the style. The first known owner was Charles Saunders who married Mary Cole Paine, whose family gave the area its name. The house was listed on the National Register of Historic Places in 1998.

== Description and history ==
The Saunders–Paine House is set facing south on the north side of Paine Hollow Road, a now-residential street that led to a historically important landing to the west in the 19th century. The house is a 1 1/2-story Cape style wood-frame structure, five bays wide, with a side-gable roof, central chimney, wood clapboard siding, and a brick foundation. The front facade is symmetrically arranged, with two sash windows on either side of the center entrance, which is flanked by fluted pilasters and topped by a five-light transom window and an entablature. The windows have simple molded surrounds. A single-story addition extends the kitchen to the rear.

The interior of the house follows a traditional center-chimney plan. A narrow stairwell leads upstairs from the vestibule between the entrance and the chimney, and there are large rooms on either side of the chimney. The kitchen is centered behind the chimney, with small rooms in the rear corners. There are two bedrooms upstairs. The best room is that west of the chimney, which features high-quality carved wood paneling and a fireplace mantel with paneled pilasters. The ceilings are plastered, and floors are wide wooden planking.

Charles Saunders married Mary Cole Paine sometime before 1837, and is presumed to have taken up residence here at that time. Mary was the granddaughter of Thomas Paine, who first settled this area in 1809. As a consequence of the large number of Paines who settled in the area, it became known as "Paine Hollow". The house was owned by descendants of the Saunderses into the 20th century.

== See also ==
- National Register of Historic Places listings in Barnstable County, Massachusetts
