= Evan Holloway =

American artist

- Born: 1967 (age 58–59); La Mirada, California
- Education: University of California

Evan Holloway (born 1967) is an American artist. Holloway received his BFA in 1989 and his MFA in 1997 from the University of California (Los Angeles and Santa Cruz). He lives and works in Los Angeles, USA. Holloway is currently represented by Xavier Hufkens in Brussels and David Kordansky.

== Style ==
The work of Evan Holloway has been featured in numerous institutional exhibitions, including Don’t Look Back: The 1990s at MOCA, The Geffen Contemporary, Los Angeles (2016); You’ve Got to Know the Rules...to Break Them, de la Cruz Collection, Miami (2015–16); Lightness of Being, Public Art Fund, City Hall Park, New York (2013); Theatrical Gestures, Herzliya Museum of Contemporary Art, Israel (2013); All of this and nothing, Hammer Museum, Los Angeles (2011); the 2008 California Biennial, Orange County Museum of Art, Newport Beach, California (2008); The Uncertainty of Objects & Ideas, Hirshhorn Museum and Sculpture Garden, Washington, D.C. (2006); and the Whitney Biennial, Whitney Museum of American Art, New York (2002). His work is currently on view in the survey Los Angeles - A Fiction, Musée d’art contemporain de Lyon, France, through July 9, 2017, which traveled from the Astrup Fearnley Museet, Oslo (2016). Holloway lives and works in Los Angeles.

== Exhibitions, awards, collections ==
His work has been included in numerous international group exhibitions, including the 2002 Whitney Biennial; the 2008 California Biennial; The Uncertainty of Objects and Ideas: Recent Sculpture at the Hirshhorn Museum and Sculpture Garden, Washington DC; All of This and Nothing at the Hammer Museum, Los Angeles; and Moby Dick and Wizard of Oz, both at CCA Wattis Institute, CA. In 2008 Holloway had a solo exhibition at the Pomona College Museum of Art, Claremont, CA.

The artist's work has also been exhibited at leading art institutions in Europe, including Beaufort 03 in Belgium, W139 in Amsterdam, the Musée Departemental d’Art Contemporain de Rochechouart in France, the Castello di Rivoli in Torino and The Barbican in London.

Holloway has been the recipient of a number of awards including: FOCA Grant (2005), Penny McCall Foundation Award (2004) and Louis Comfort Tiffany Foundation Award (2002).

Notable collections include: Smithsonian Hirshhorn Museum and Sculpture Garden, Washington DC, USA; Museum of Contemporary Art, Los Angeles, USA; and Whitney Museum of Contemporary Art, New York, USA.

== Selected publications ==
- Evan Holloway, London: Ridinghouse, 2012.
- Trees Heads Molds, Brussels: Xavier Hufkens, 2012.
- Sculpture Today, London & New York: Phaidon Press, 2010.
- LA Artland: Contemporary Art from Los Angeles, London: Black Dog Publishing, 2005.
