= Janet Doub Erickson =

American graphic artist and writer (1924–2021)

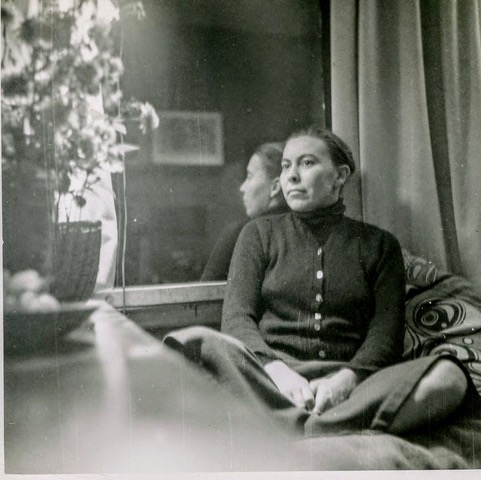
- Born: Janet Ann Doub; June 29, 1924; Hagerstown, Maryland, U.S.
- Died: September 3, 2021 (aged 97); Wellfleet, Massachusetts, U.S.
- Education: University of Mary Washington; Massachusetts College of Art and Design
- Known for: Printmaking, Painting

Janet Ann Doub Erickson (June 29, 1924 – September 3, 2021) was an American graphic artist and writer who popularized linoleum-block and woodblock printing in the post-World War II period. She was a co-founder of the Blockhouse of Boston, an innovative art and design cooperative in Boston, Massachusetts. In the preface to her influential book, Block Printing on Textiles, the publisher of a leading arts education magazine noted that, "more than anyone else in America today, Janet Doub Erickson has lifted a craft that had become dull, dead, and dated to a position where we can see its challenging possibilities in the creative renaissance we are now experiencing.”

== Artistic career ==
=== Blockhouse of Boston ===
Janet Doub Erickson was founding partner, chief designer, and head of production of the Blockhouse of Boston, where she was credited with producing ninety percent of the organization’s designs. For her work she became the second young Boston artist chosen for recognition by the Institute of Contemporary Art.

Blockhouse artisans designed and produced original textiles including draperies, wall hangings, table linens, costume treatments and other art. The co-op specialized in linoleum blockprints — also known as linocuts — and screen printing. Blockhouse was noted for bold modernism as well as original use of New England themes and motifs intermingled with designs at times inspired by indigenous and ethnic arts from around the world.

From its founding in 1947 to its dissolution in 1955, the work of Blockhouse was featured in Life, Vogue, The New Yorker, The New York Times, Harper's Bazaar, The Christian Science Monitor, Women's Wear Daily, The Boston Globe, and numerous other regional publications.

=== Other artistic endeavors ===
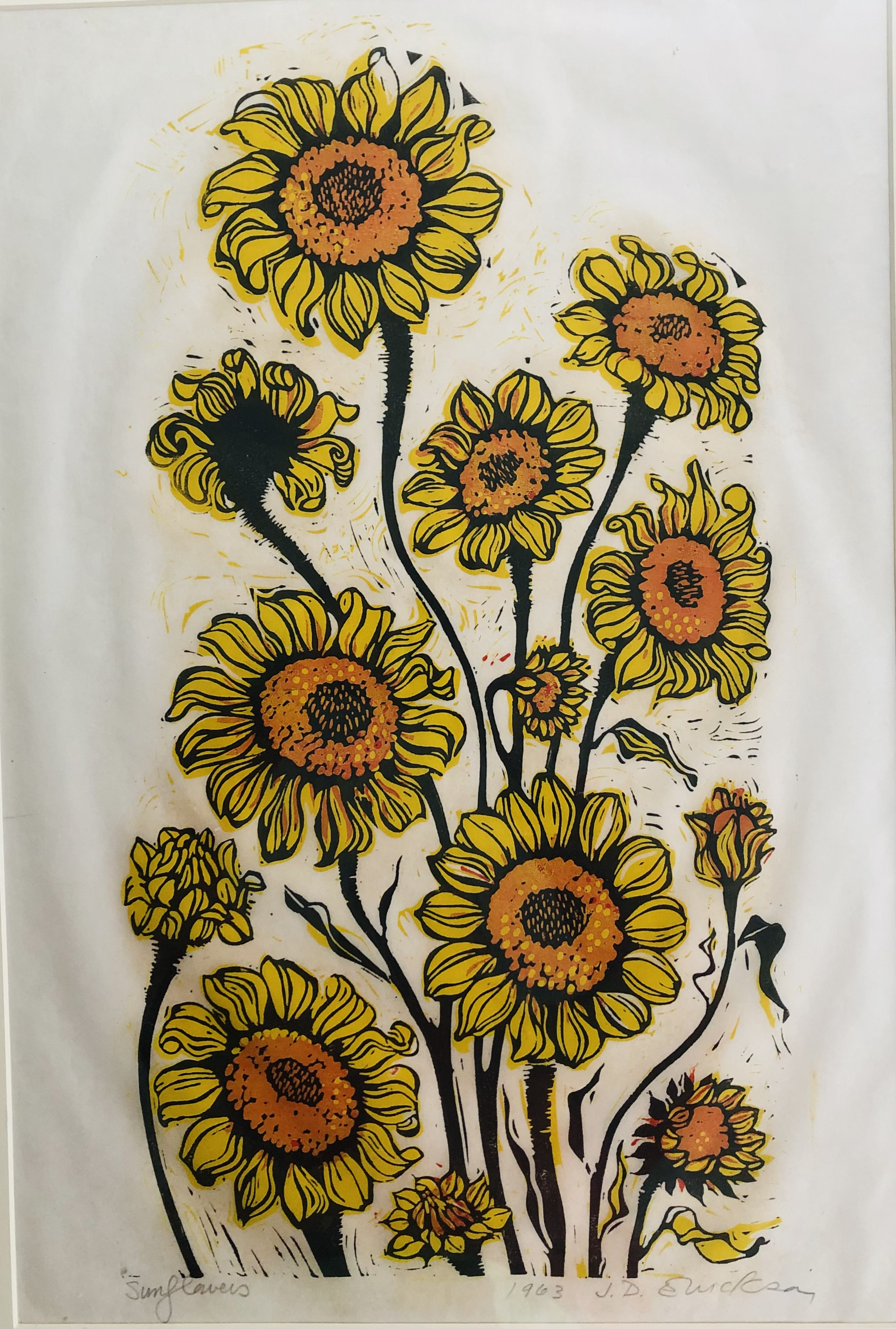
A multicolour linoprint of sunflowers

In 1954 she received a Young American Artist award for printed textile design from the American Craft Council. She received the Louis Comfort Tiffany Foundation grant in 1955 for textile design.

Janet Doub Erickson’s art has been represented in more than twenty-five regional and national shows and international traveling exhibits. The United States State Department included Blockhouse textiles in international exhibitions that toured in Europe and Israel during the nineteen-fifties. She also designed textiles for Harvard and Tufts universities in addition to Wellesley and Williams colleges.

Janet Doub Erickson was notable for pioneering the practice of jumping on linoleum and wood blocks to make the ink stick deeper into her textiles. For this innovation Gjon Mili profiled and photographed her for the newsweekly Life in 1951, giving her the nickname of “Jumping Janet.”

Lares & Penates, 1950 (linocut), Janet Doub Erickson

Doub was also the subject of a profile in the art magazine Craft Horizons. Her work was reviewed in American Artist and won a first prize in textile design from the American Craftsmen's Council in 1954.

=== Style and influences ===
Her work was wide-ranging in her willingness to seek inspiration in styles from a diverse range of cultures. She drew considerable inspiration from art she encountered during her extensive time abroad, living at various points in Mexico, Croatia, Italy, and Saudi Arabia. In 1952 a journalist described her style in a profile of her for the Christian Science Monitor:

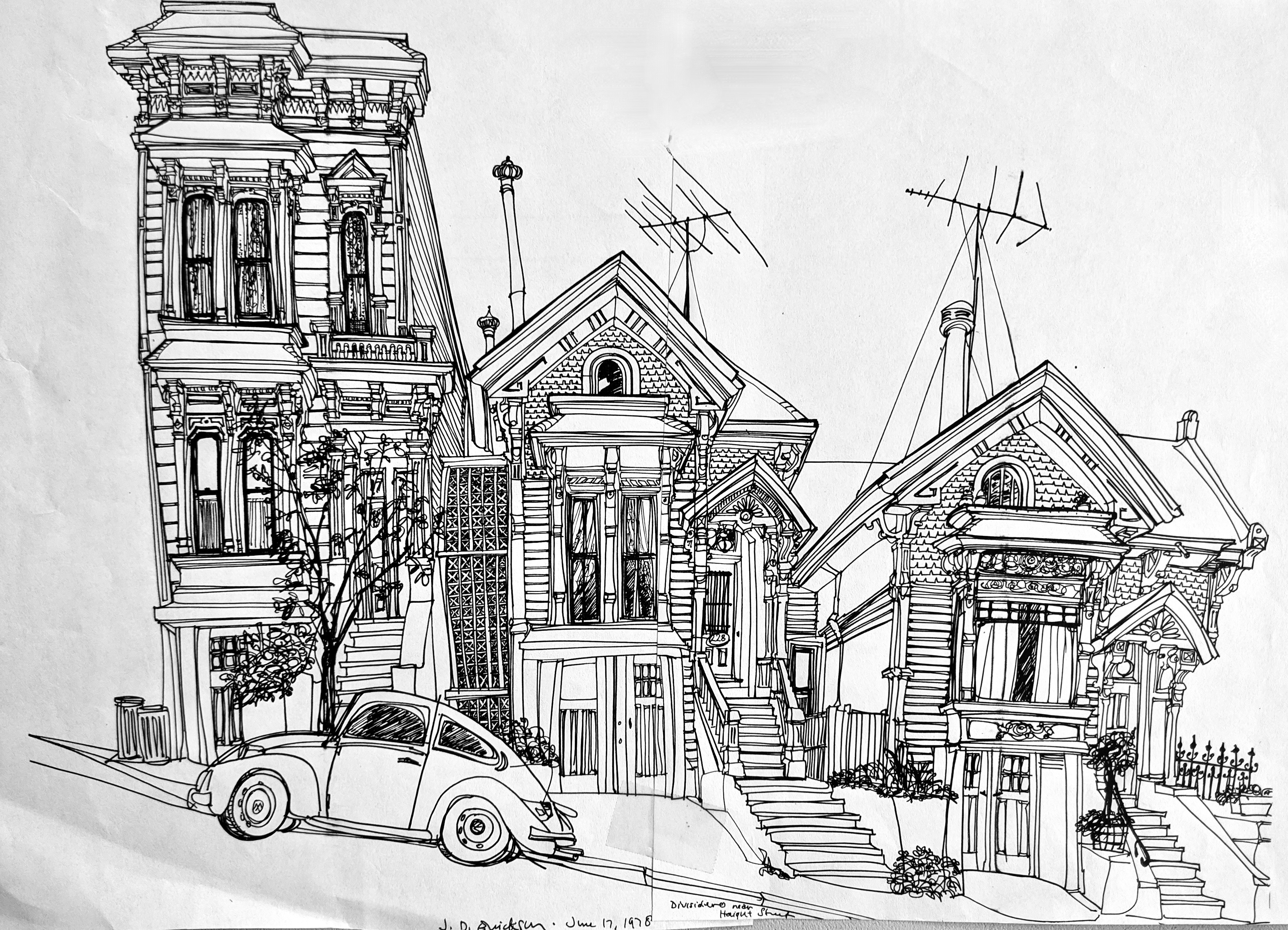
A 1978 street scene in San Francisco

She goes to New Guinea for her motif, 'Checkerboard,' to China for her ‘Quan-Yin’ design, to Guatemala for ‘Mayan Stele,’ and to a Northwest Indian reservation for ‘Totemotif.’"

Her prints, drawings, and paintings have been purchased for the permanent collections of the Wadsworth Atheneum, the Boston Museum of Fine Arts, and the Saudi Arabian Royal Commission for Jubail and Yanbu.

She signed her work in various ways over the years, including as "Janet Doub," "Janet Ann Doub," and "J. D. Erickson."

== Writing ==
Erickson’s first book on blockprinting, Blockprinting on Textiles (Reinhold 1966), summarizing her textile-printing and design practices, went into two editions.

A 1961 book she co-wrote with Adelaide Sproul, Printmaking Without A Press (Watson-Guptill 1961), popularized both traditional and innovative linoleum (linocut) and wood-cut printing techniques.

In 1989 she published her early line drawings in the retrospective book Drawings of Old Boston Houses, an architectonic work focused on her youth in New England.

== Personal life ==
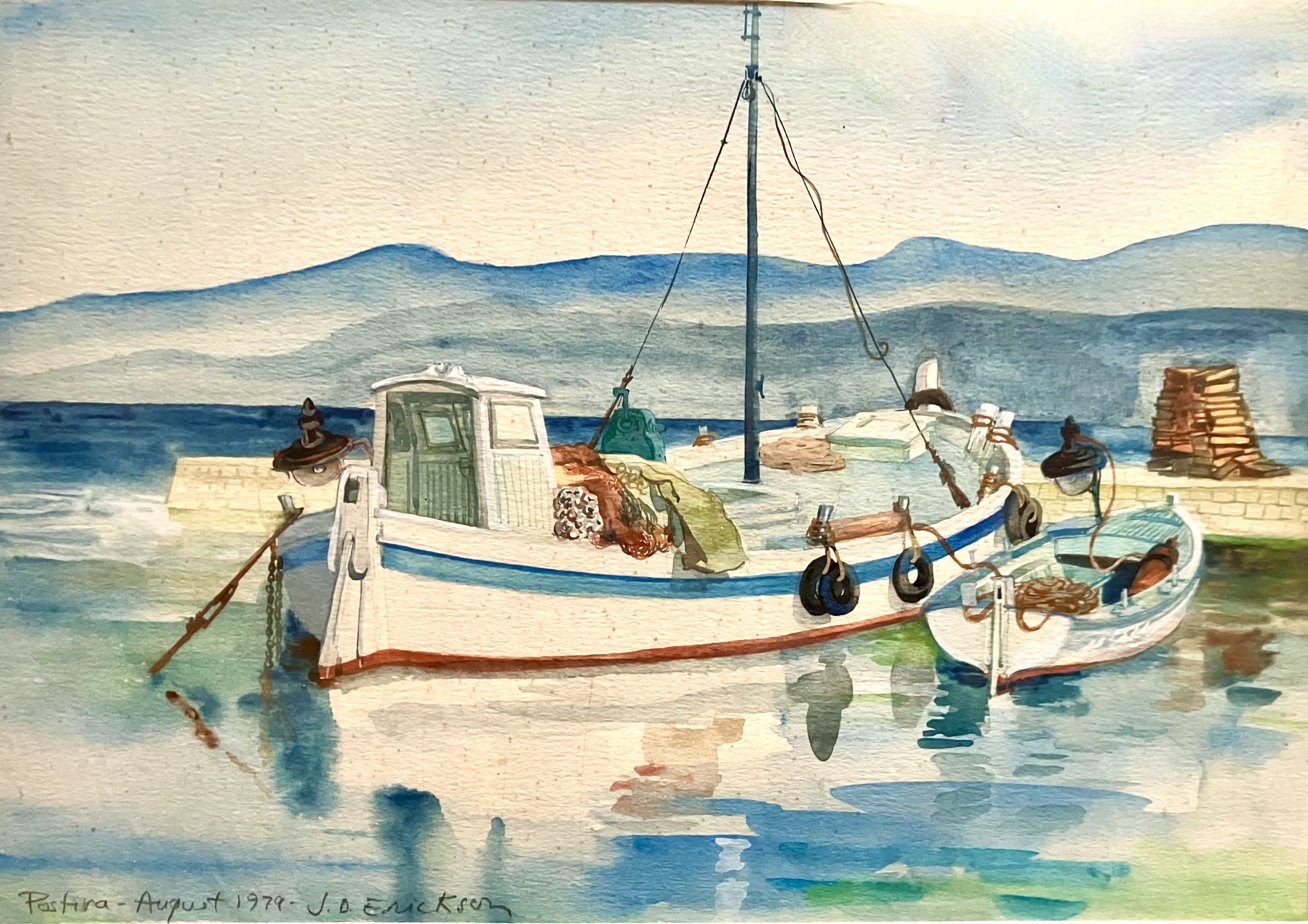
Fishing boat docked at the sardine factory pier, Postira, Dalmatia, 1979

Janet Ann Doub was born in Hagerstown, Maryland and spent her early years in nearby Boonsboro, Maryland, before moving to Winchester, Massachusetts in the 1930s and graduating from the Massachusetts College of Art in 1947. Doub married Evarts Erickson, with whom she had five children, and adopted the name Janet Doub Erickson. In the 1950s the couple moved to Mexico and lived for several years on a fellowship from The Louis Comfort Tiffany Foundation.

She died at her home on Duck Creek in Wellfleet, Massachusetts, on September 3, 2021, at the age of 97.
