= The Blockhouse of Boston =

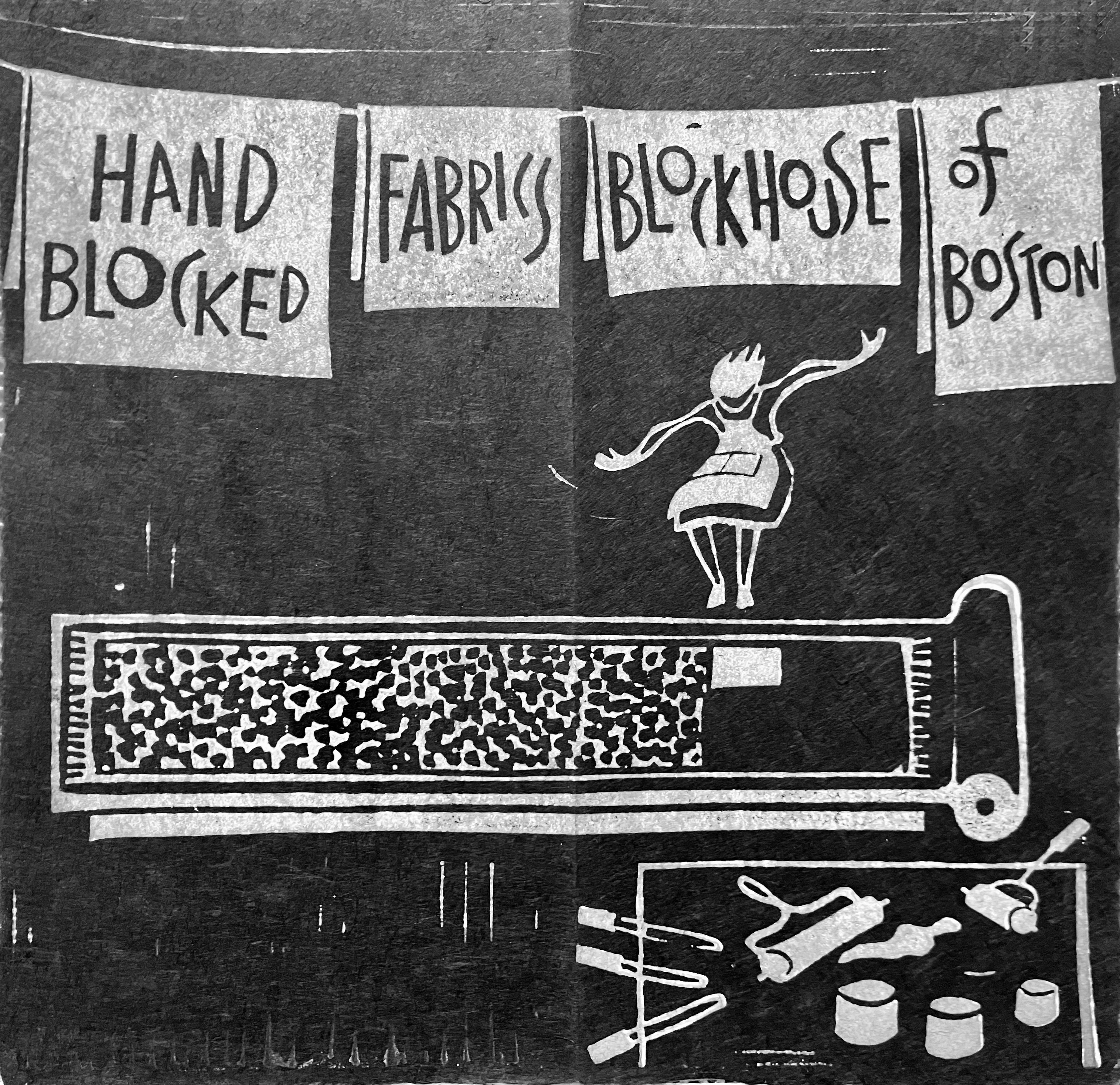

The Blockhouse of Boston was a pioneering art and design cooperative of alumni from the Massachusetts College of Art in Boston, Massachusetts that opened its doors in 1947. Blockhouse artisans, primarily the then-recent art school graduate Janet Doub Erickson, designed and produced original textiles including draperies, wall hangings, table linens, costume treatments and other art. The co-op specialized in linoleum blockprints — also known as linocuts — and screen printing. Blockhouse was known for original use of New England themes and motifs intermingled with bold ethnic designs at times inspired by pre-Columbian art and sometimes with modernist motifs. As a journalist described some of Blockhouse principal designer Janet Doub Erickson's inspirations in a 1952 profile, "she goes to New Guinea for her motif, 'Checkerboard,' to China for her "Quan-Yin" design, to Guatemala for "Mayan Stele," and to a Northwest Indian reservation for "Totemotif."

However, she often just stayed home, looking for inspiration in the architecture and history of Boston and surrounding towns in New England.

== Origins, organization, impact, and legacy ==
=== Origins ===
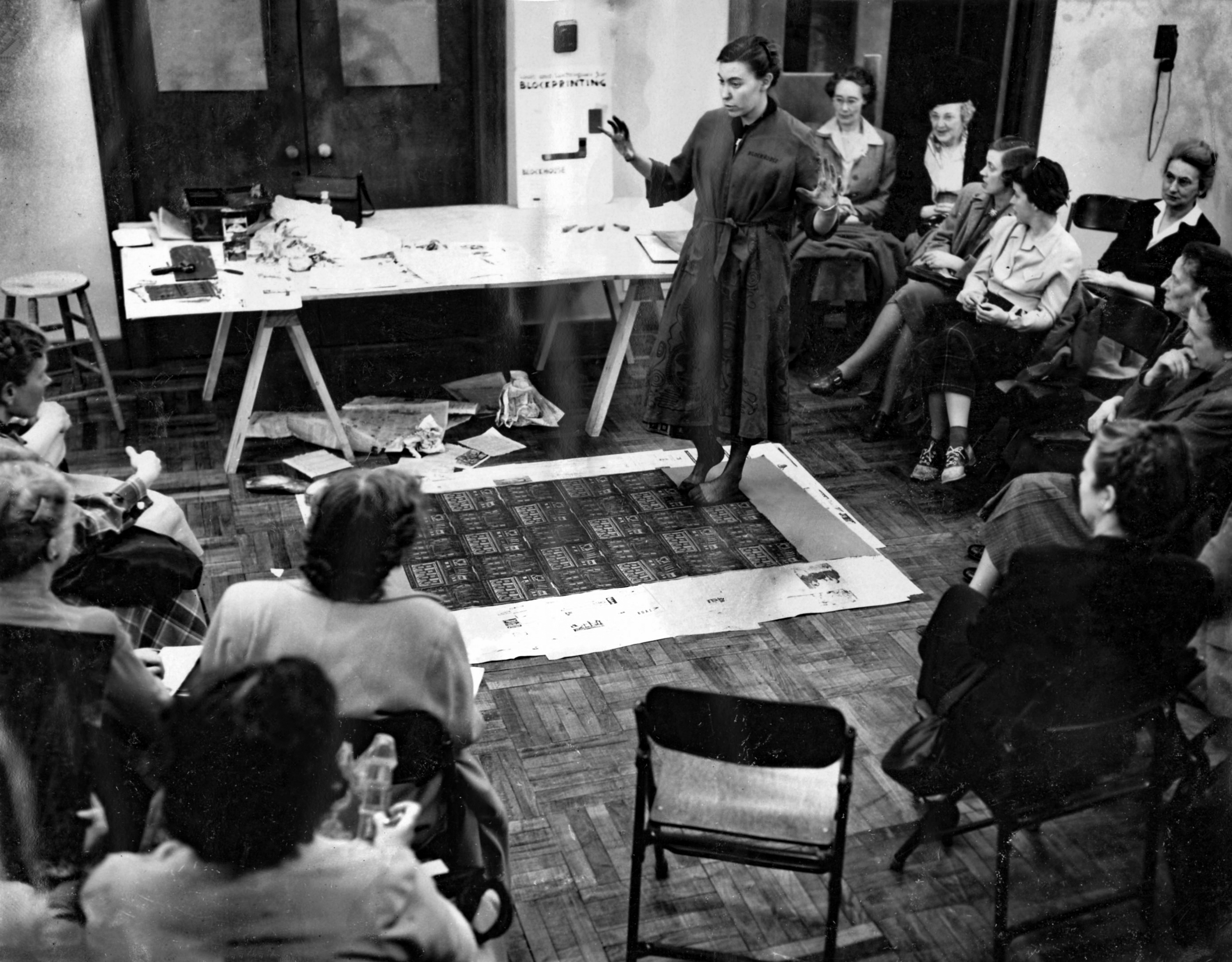
Janet Doub demonstrating block printing at the Farnsworth Art Museum in Rockland, Maine in 1949.

Founded in 1947 by twelve students and alumni of the Massachusetts College of Art, Blockhouse sought to “provide artists the opportunity to establish a dignified and mutually profitable relationship with the buying public.” Publicity Flyer for the Blockhouse of Boston]]The founders described Blockhouse's mission as follows:

"Blockhouse hand-printed fabrics are the product of a group of artists searching for a new and socially useful outlet for the expression of their talents. We hope that our designs conceived in freshness of vision and executed with technical skill, will contribute to and stimulate interest in contemporary design as it develops toward a universal idiom."

=== Organization ===
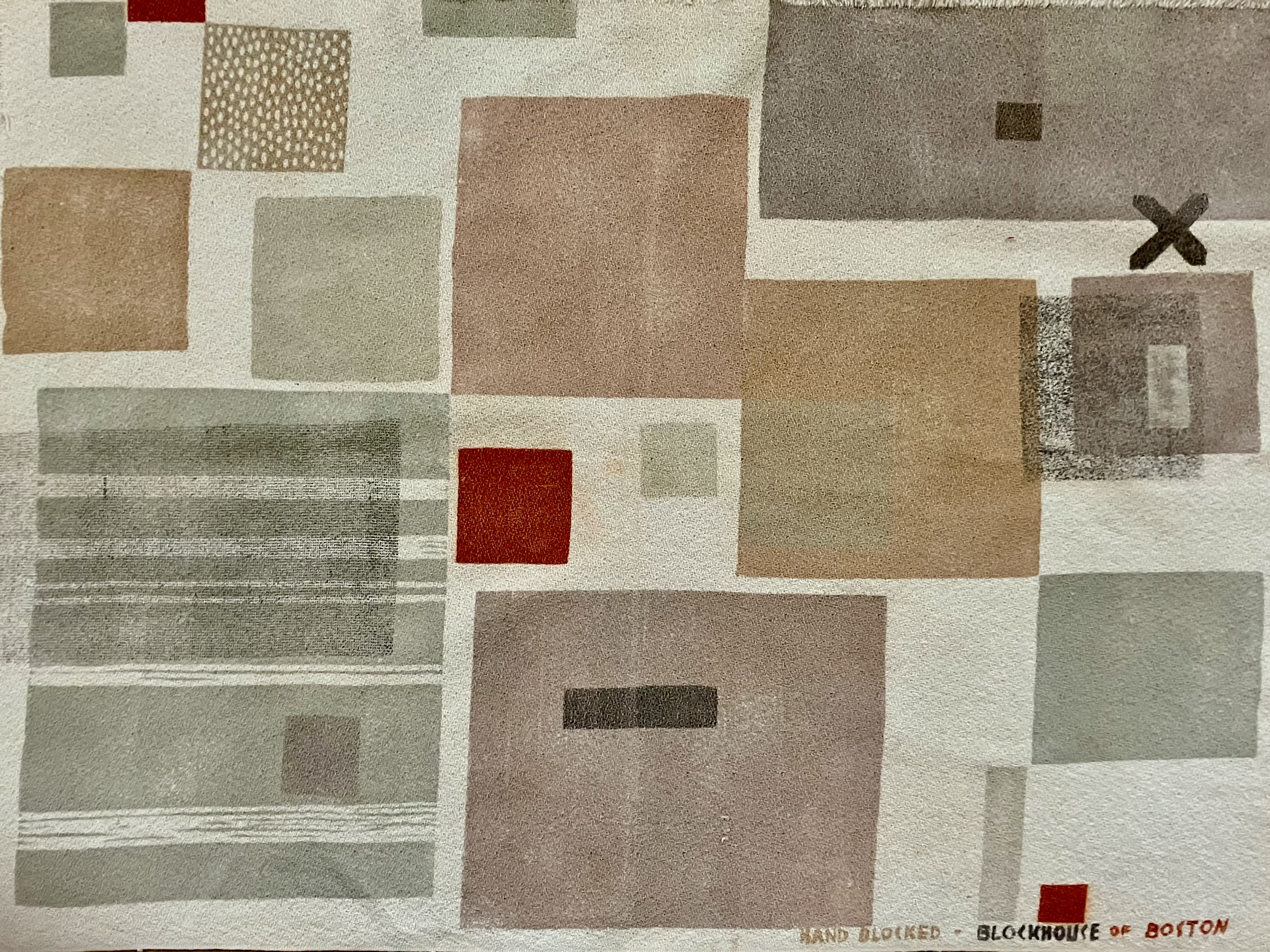
Blockhouse of Boston textile, 1955

Originally located at a gallery in the Oceanside Hotel and Casino on Lexington Avenue in Magnolia, Massachusetts, then Cambridge Street in Boston, as Blockhouse became more successful the cooperative moved to occupy a floor of 10 Arlington Avenue overlooking Boston Common.

In the beginning, the Blockhouse had two small apartments, one for male members and another for females, where the artists could live dormitory-style at virtually no cost and work in the studio on the premises. The original members paid five dollars each to self-fund the cooperative's initial expense renting a space.

As reported in the Boston Globe, "all chores were shared. No one drew a salary. To earn money a member had to design and print. When an article was sold 70 percent of the proceeds went to the designer, the rest to the Block-house fund. Prices were set low for handiwork - as little as $5 a yard for drape material - in order to reach as wide a market as possible."

Blockhouse artists were responsible for every step in production of their designs. This traditional handicraft method, while slowing and limiting production, assured them control to carry their ideas undistorted into the final pieces. In addition to acting as a center for artists, the Blockhouse also taught classes in silk screen and block printing, ceramics, sketching and painting in watercolor and oil.

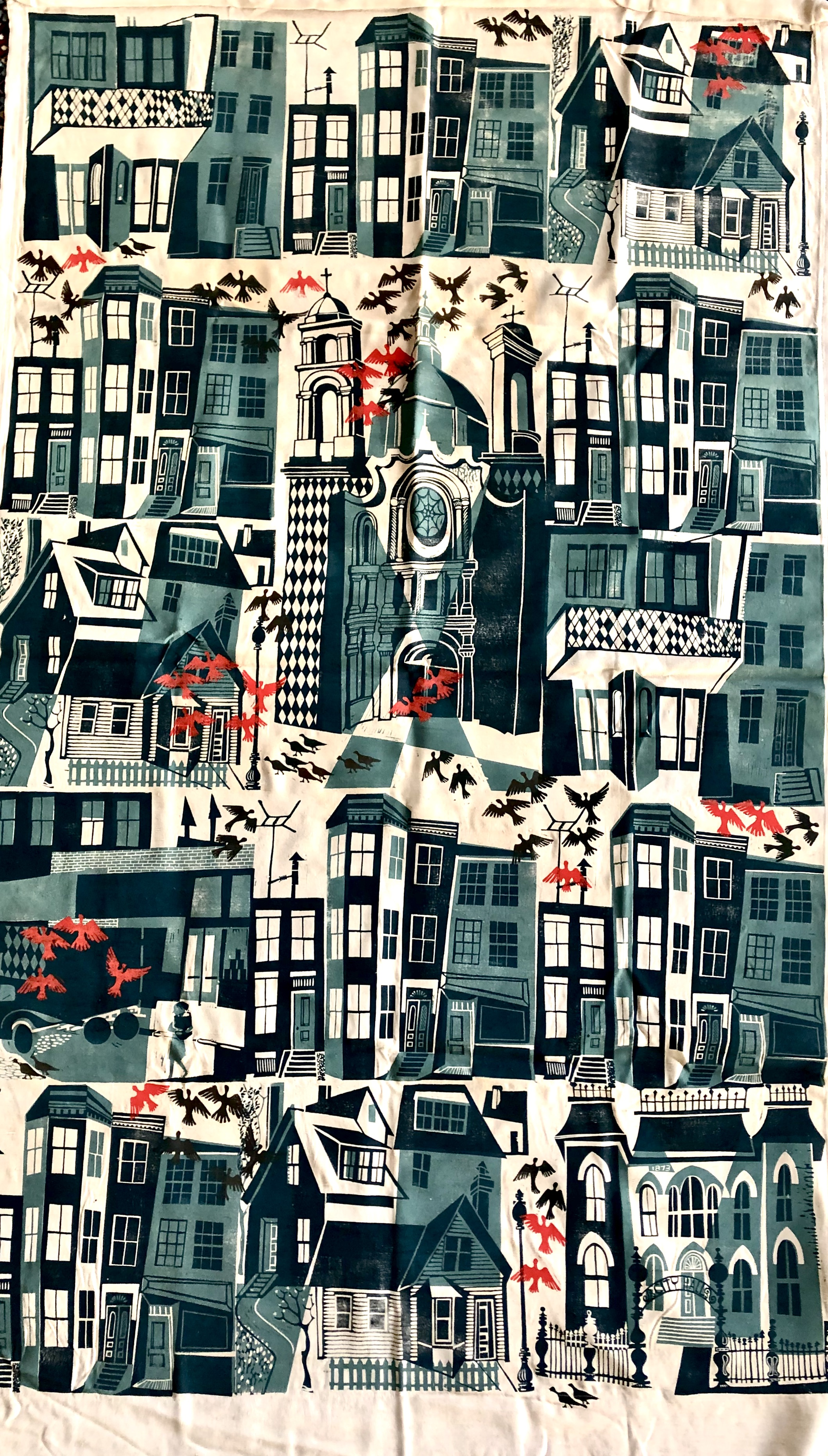
Fragment of "Salem," a large (approximately one by two meter) Blockhouse print on cotton by Janet Doub Erickson. This example shows how the artist repeated the image with slight variations to create the larger textile pattern she sought.

Over time, the Blockhouse evolved away from its utopian beginnings to become a more commercially focused enterprise. Of the founders, only partners Janet Doub Erickson and Paul Coombs remained active until Blockhouse's closing in 1955 and Janet Doub Erickson's subsequent departure for Mexico to pursue other artistic projects.

=== Impact ===
In addition to its award-winning, innovative designs, Blockhouse's significance was bolstered by its use of post-war marketing techniques to move artistically innovative work into the broader New England and national marketplace through the synthesis of traditional techniques, diverse designs, and modern guerrilla marketing tactics. From 1947 to 1955, when it closed its doors, the work of Blockhouse was featured in Life, Vogue The New Yorker, The New York Times, Harper's Bazaar, The Christian Science Monitor, Women's Wear Daily, the Boston Globe and numerous other regional publications.

Designs from the Blockhouse collection were reproduced in commercial volumes by Wesley Simpson, Inc., Stoffel and Company, Strauss & Mueller, J.H. Thorp, Arundell Clarke, M. Lowenstein Sons, Century Sportswear and The Boka Company. Blockhouse textiles penetrated the larger culture through their popularity with commercial advertisers.

The Blockhouse also sought to penetrate the citadels of high culture. Blockhouse works were featured in exhibitions at Harvard's Fogg Museum, Institute of Contemporary Art, Boston, and the Boston Museum of Fine Arts. Blockhouse work also appeared at the Addison Gallery of American Art, the Wadsworth Atheneum, the Farnsworth Art Museum, the Dallas Museum of Fine Arts, and other galleries across the country.

The United States State Department included Blockhouse textiles in international exhibitions that toured in Europe and Israel during the 1950s.

=== Legacy ===
After Blockhouse disbanded, members scattered about New England and other areas of the United States, producing art and teaching Blockhouse-style textile and artistic design through the country. Surviving Blockhouse textiles are mainly in the hands of private collectors and galleries.

== Notable members ==
Blockhouse was founded and led by Paul Coombs and Janet Doub Erickson, both recent graduates of the Massachusetts College of Art. Coombs was a veteran of the two world wars who became interested in art while recovering in the hospital from an injury sustained in the Pacific Rim. Considerably older than his partners, he focused on the commercialization of Blockhouse designs and managed the business side of Blockhouse, although he also contributed original designs.

Other founding members included Elaine Biganess and David Berger.

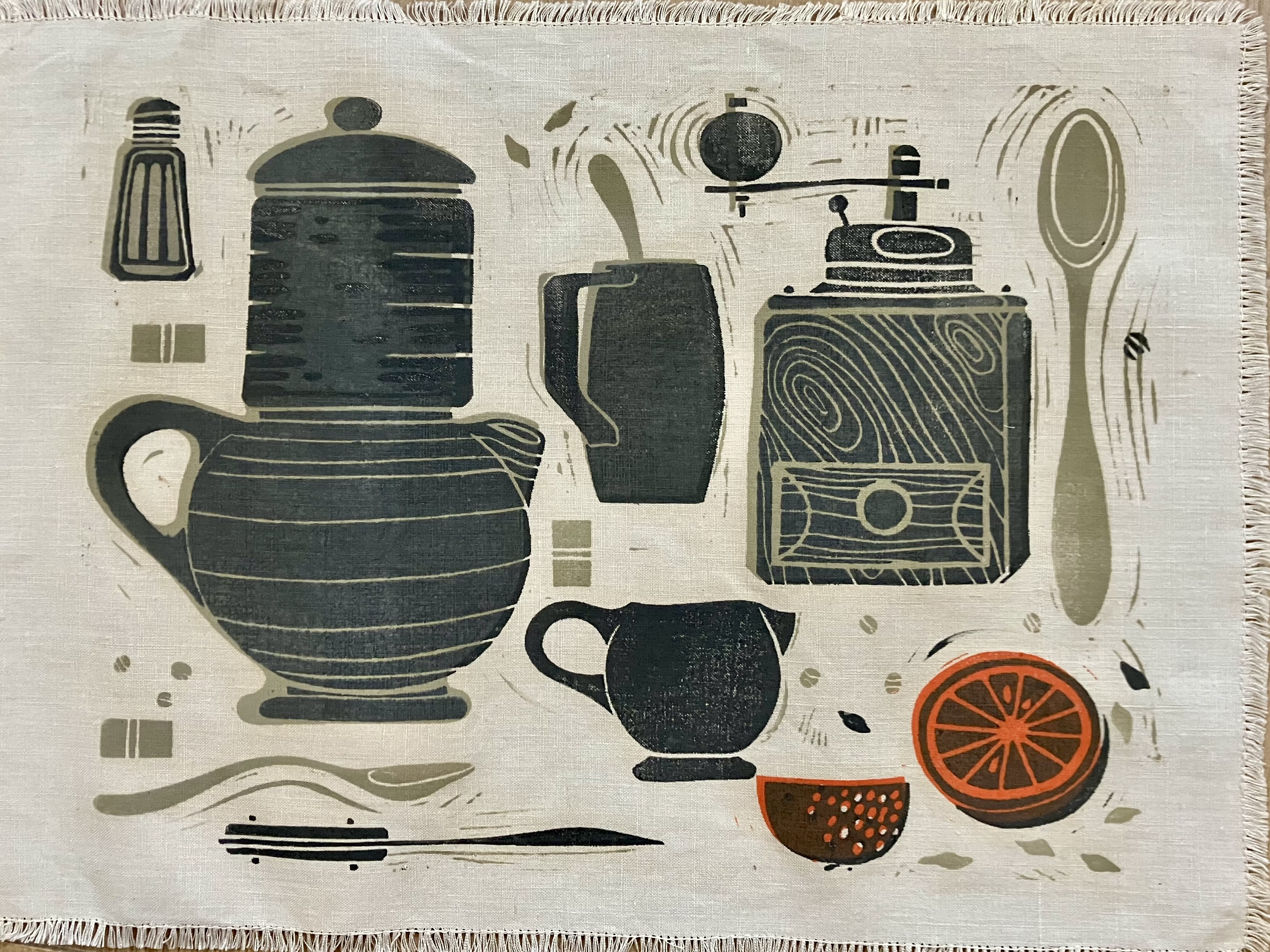
Blockhouse of Boston placemat, 1954

Janet Doub Erickson was founding partner, chief designer, and head of production. She was credited with producing ninety percent of the Blockhouse's designs. Among honors, awards, and recognitions over her professional life, at Blockhouse she was the second young Boston artist chosen for recognition by the Institute of Contemporary Art and was profiled in a 1951 issue of Life She would go on to author books on blockprinting, including Printmaking Without A Press (Reinhold 1966) and Block Printing on Textiles (Watson-Guptill 1961). She taught block printing in Massachusetts, Connecticut, New York, California, and elsewhere over her long career after Blockhouse. Her promotion of block printing was influential in its post-war artistic renaissance. Later in life, she wrote on textile design and vernacular architecture. She also published another book of her line drawings of Boston during the Blockhouse period.

Eight other artists joined Blockhouse, but they were less active in design, production, and commercialization.
