= Sarah Eileen Hanley =

1883-1958, artist

- Born: December 7, 1883; Sligo, Ireland
- Died: February 11, 1958 (aged 74); Laurel Hollow, New York

Sarah Eileen Hanley (December 7, 1883 – February 11, 1958) was a painter. She is known for her friendship with Louis Comfort Tiffany as well as her involvement with the Louis Comfort Tiffany Foundation.

== Biography ==
Born on December 7, 1883, in Sligo, Ireland, Hanley emigrated to the United States in 1905. She lived in New York and became a nurse.

Hanley met the artist Louis Comfort Tiffany in 1910 when she was hired as a caregiver to Tiffany who was recovering from a kidney infection. The two formed a friendship that lasted the rest of Tiffany's life. She lived Tiffany from 1910 to 1933. Tiffany built her a house adjacent to his home, Laurelton Hall. When the Louis Comfort Tiffany Foundation was established in 1918, Hanley served as its first director.

In the early 1930s Hanley exhibited her paintings and watercolors at the Anderson Galleries in New York City. Hanley inherited her house and a monetary share of Tiffany's estate upon his death in 1933. She exhibited sporadically through the 1930s ans 1940s.

Hanley was a member of National Association of Women Artists. In 1946 she became a life fellow of the Metropolitan Museum of Art.

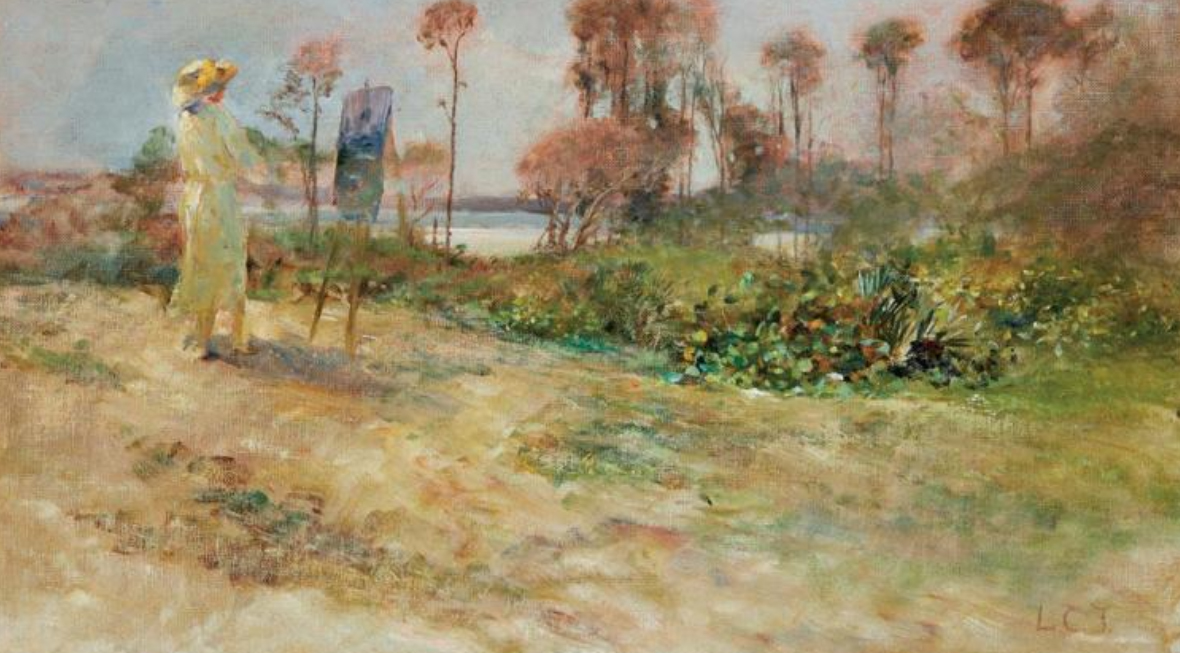
Sarah at the Florida Shore by Louis Comfort Tiffany

Hanley died on February 11, 1958, in Laurel Hollow, New York She left her estate, including several pieces by Tiffany, to the Dominican Sisters of St. Mary's of the Springs (now Dominican Sisters of Peace) in Columbus, Ohio.
