= Wellfleet, Massachusetts =

Town in Massachusetts, United States

- Town
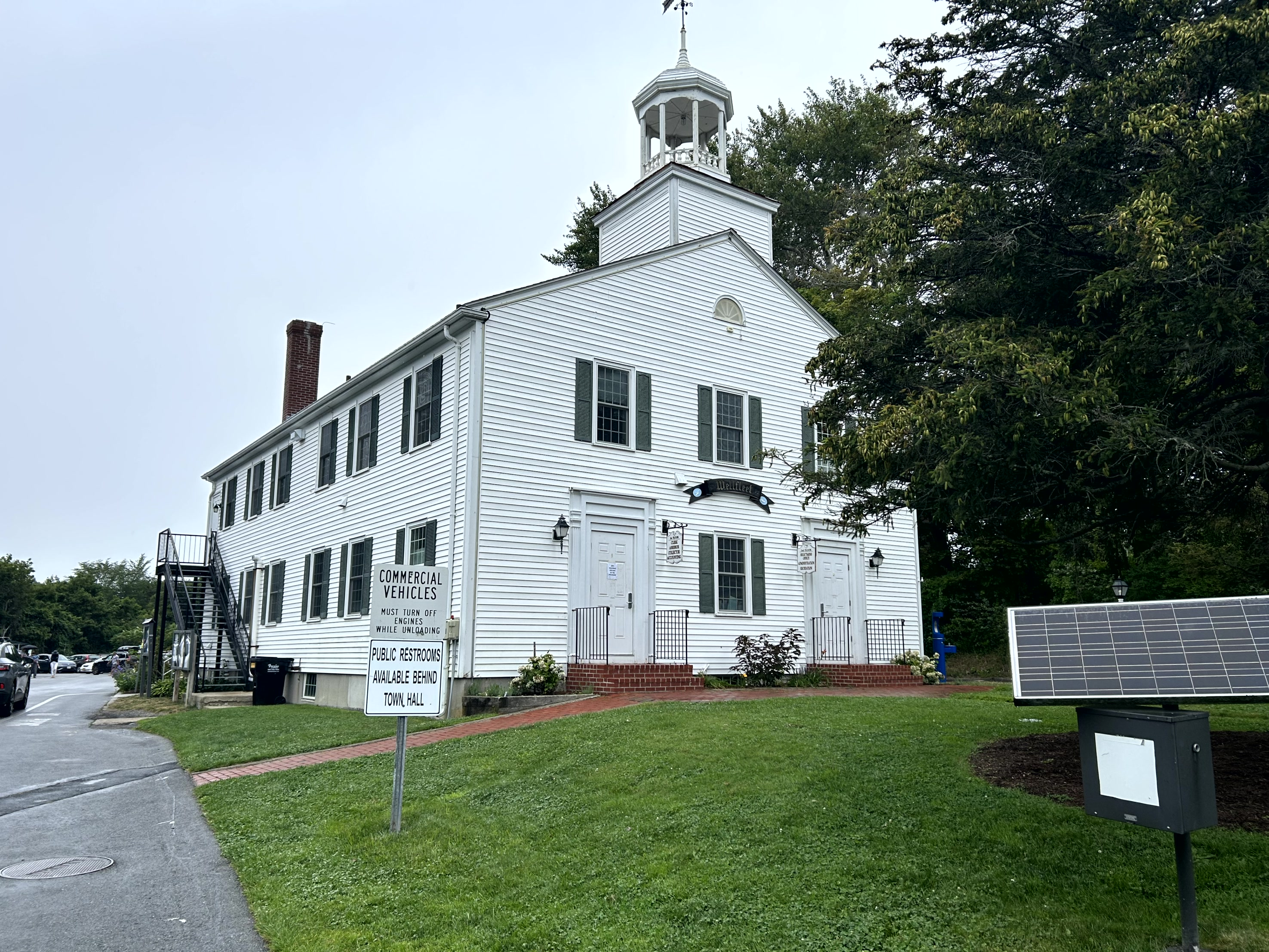
- Wellfleet Town Hall

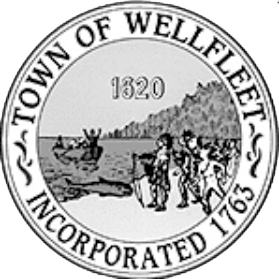
- Seal

- Location in Barnstable County and the state of Massachusetts.
- Coordinates: 41°56′15″N 70°02′00″W
- Country: United States
- State: Massachusetts
- County: Barnstable
- Incorporated: 1763

Government
  - Type: Open town meeting
  - Town Administrator: Thomas Guerino
  - Board of Selectmen: Board of Selectmen

Area
  - Total: 35.4 sq mi (91.7 km^{2})
  - Land: 19.8 sq mi (51.3 km^{2})
  - Water: 15.6 sq mi (40.5 km^{2})
- Elevation: 49 ft (15 m)

Population (2020)
  - Total: 3,566
  - Density: 180/sq mi (69.5/km^{2})
- Time zone: UTC−5 (Eastern)
  - Summer (DST): UTC−4 (Eastern)
- ZIP Codes: 02663 (South Wellfleet); 02667 (Wellfleet)
- Area code: 508/774
- FIPS code: 25-74385
- GNIS feature ID: 0618261
- Website: www.wellfleet-ma.gov

Wellfleet is a town on Cape Cod in Massachusetts. The town had a population of 3,566 at the 2020 United States census, with the summer population growing nearly sixfold. A total of 70% of the town's land area is under protection, and nearly half of it is part of the Cape Cod National Seashore. Wellfleet is known for its oysters, which are celebrated in the annual October Wellfleet OysterFest.

== History ==
The area was originally settled by Europeans in the 1650s as Billingsgate (after the famous fish market in East London). In 1717, the pirate Samuel Bellamy was sailing nearby when his ship, the Whydah, sank offshore, together with over 4.5 short tons (4.1 tonnes) of gold and silver and all but two of its 145 men. The wreck was discovered in 1984, the first of only two confirmed pirate shipwrecks ever to have been discovered.

Wellfleet was part of neighboring Eastham until 1763 when it achieved town status after nearly 30 years of petitioning. Wellfleet's oyster beds drove the early economy, as did whaling and fishing. The town was home to 30 whaling ships at the time of the American Revolution.

Because of the decline of whaling and the mackerel catch in the late 19th century, the fleet declined, being completely free of schooners by 1900. The oyster fleet continued, however, and many types of shellfish continue to be harvested. Despite this decline, a church near the town center continues to operate a clock that chimes ship’s time.

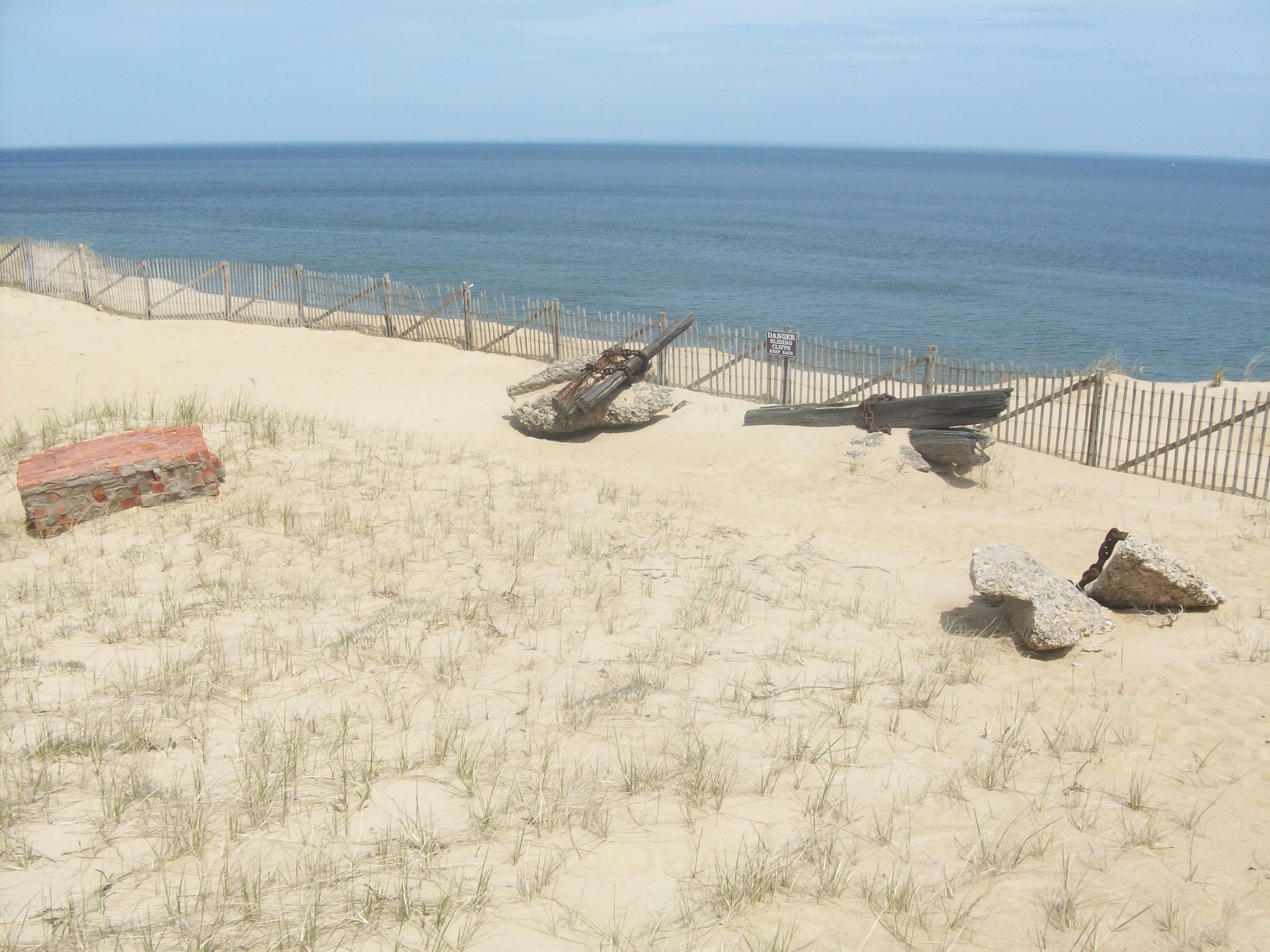
The remains of Marconi's station

Guglielmo Marconi built the USA's first transatlantic radio transmitter station on a coastal bluff in South Wellfleet in 1901–1902. The first radio telegraph transmission from the United States to England was sent from this station on January 18, 1903, a ceremonial telegram from President Theodore Roosevelt to King Edward VII. Most of the transmitter site is gone, however, as three quarters of the land it originally encompassed has been eroded into the sea. The South Wellfleet station's first call sign was "CC" for Cape Cod.

In 1961, President John F. Kennedy created the Cape Cod National Seashore, which encompasses most of the Atlantic shoreline of Cape Cod. In Wellfleet, the territory circles the town, from Jeremy Point through the marshes and "islands" along the Herring River, includes Cahoon Hollow Beach, and extends the length of the Atlantic shore of the town.

Construction of the Chequessett Inn in the late 19th century contributed to the development of a tourist economy in Wellfleet. The town has the second greatest concentration of art galleries on Cape Cod, right after Provincetown. It is also a popular retirement spot.

== Geography ==
According to the United States Census Bureau, the town has a total area of 35.4 square miles (91.7 km^{2}), of which 19.8 square miles (51.3 km^{2}) is land and 15.6 square miles (40.5 km^{2}), or 44.11%, is water. Wellfleet is bordered by Truro to the north, the Atlantic Ocean to the east, Eastham to the south, and Cape Cod Bay to the west. Wellfleet is approximately 14 miles (23 km) south of Provincetown, 33 miles (53 km) (by road) northeast of Barnstable, 48 miles (77 km) from the Sagamore Bridge, and 100 miles (160 km) (by road) southeast of Boston.

The lands of Wellfleet wrap around Wellfleet Harbor, extending from the main portion of the Cape around the harbor to Jeremy Point. At one time, Wellfleet Harbor included an island known as Billingsgate Island, which sat at the harbor's mouth, to the south of the point. Once a flourishing small community with a lighthouse, the island was destroyed by coastal erosion and now exists as a shoal that is exposed at low tide. The Billingsgate shoals are split between Wellfleet and neighboring Eastham. Several other inlets extend inland from the harbor, at the mouth of the Herring River (also called "The Gut"), Duck Creek, Blackfish Creek and Fresh Brook (commonly known as "The Run") which leads to several brooks.

In addition to the Seashore, Wellfleet Bay Wildlife Sanctuary, run by Massachusetts Audubon, surrounds much of The Run, including part of Small Island (between The Run and Blackfish Creek). Between the sanctuary, seashore and other small parks and beaches, seventy percent of the town's area is protected.

A small whaling community was founded on the land that is now Wellfleet Bay Wildlife Sanctuary, and was originally known as Silver Spring, after Silver Spring Brook. What remains of it is a marsh that was once its harbor, known as the Silver Spring Brook Marshes. This land is now protected by the Massachusetts Audubon Society in its Wellfleet Bay Sanctuary.

== Climate ==
The town of Wellfleet has a mild summer humid continental climate (Dfb). The plant hardiness zone is 7a, with an average annual extreme minimum air temperature of 3.6 °F (−15.7 °C). The average seasonal (Nov–Apr) snowfall total is around 30 in (76 cm). The average snowiest month is February, which corresponds to the annual peak in nor'easter activity.

Climate data for Wellfleet, Barnstable County, Massachusetts (1981–2010 averages).
Month	Jan	Feb	Mar	Apr	May	Jun	Jul	Aug	Sep	Oct	Nov	Dec	Year
Mean daily maximum °F (°C)	38.2 (3.4)	39.5 (4.2)	44.7 (7.1)	53.5 (11.9)	62.8 (17.1)	72.0 (22.2)	78.2 (25.7)	77.4 (25.2)	70.8 (21.6)	61.0 (16.1)	52.8 (11.6)	44.1 (6.7)	58.0 (14.4)
Daily mean °F (°C)	31.6 (−0.2)	32.8 (0.4)	37.8 (3.2)	46.3 (7.9)	55.3 (12.9)	64.5 (18.1)	70.9 (21.6)	70.4 (21.3)	64.0 (17.8)	54.4 (12.4)	46.2 (7.9)	37.3 (2.9)	51.0 (10.6)
Mean daily minimum °F (°C)	25.1 (−3.8)	26.0 (−3.3)	30.9 (−0.6)	39.1 (3.9)	47.8 (8.8)	57.1 (13.9)	63.6 (17.6)	63.4 (17.4)	57.3 (14.1)	47.8 (8.8)	39.6 (4.2)	30.5 (−0.8)	44.1 (6.7)
Average precipitation inches (mm)	3.72 (94)	3.16 (80)	4.05 (103)	4.27 (108)	3.28 (83)	3.55 (90)	2.68 (68)	3.92 (100)	3.59 (91)	4.26 (108)	4.35 (110)	3.80 (97)	44.63 (1,134)
Average relative humidity (%)	70.2	68.3	67.2	68.5	70.8	74.2	76.4	76.3	76.6	72.6	69.6	68.5	71.6
Source: PRISM Climate Group

=== Dew point averages ===
Month	Jan	Feb	Mar	Apr	May	Jun	Jul	Aug	Sep	Oct	Nov	Dec	Year
Average Dew Point °F	23.0	23.5	27.9	36.5	46.0	56.1	63.1	62.6	56.5	45.8	36.8	27.9	42.2
Average Dew Point °C	−5.0	−4.7	−2.3	2.5	7.8	13.4	17.3	17.0	13.6	7.7	2.7	−2.3	5.7
Source = PRISM Climate Group

== Transportation ==
U.S. Route 6 passes from north to south through the town. The town's commercial center lies west of the route, along the shores of the harbor. The route was straightened in the mid-20th century, and some maps still consider the "old" Route 6 to be a portion of Route 6A. The town has no rail or air service. The last train left the area in the 1930s, the train station was razed and the tracks were torn up through Provincetown. The old rail line was turned into a bicycle trail, named the Cod Rail Trail, which ends in South Wellfleet. The nearest municipal airports are in Chatham and Provincetown, both about 18 miles (29 km) from town; the nearest national and international service can be found at Logan International Airport in Boston.

There is currently limited bus service between Wellfleet and Hyannis, and from there on to Boston and Logan Airport, on the Plymouth & Brockton Street Railway Company, a Plymouth-based bus service. The CCRTA, which runs between Hyannis and Provincetown, also makes stops in Wellfleet.

== Demographics ==
Historical population
Year	Pop.	±%
1790	1,117	—
1850	2,411	+115.8%
1860	2,322	−3.7%
1870	2,135	−8.1%
1880	1,875	−12.2%
1890	1,291	−31.1%
1900	988	−23.5%
1910	1,022	+3.4%
1920	826	−19.2%
1930	823	−0.4%
1940	890	+8.1%
1950	1,123	+26.2%
1960	1,404	+25.0%
1970	1,743	+24.1%
1980	2,209	+26.7%
1990	2,493	+12.9%
2000	2,749	+10.3%
2010	2,750	+0.0%
2020	3,566	+29.7%
2023*	3,627	+1.7%
* = population estimate. Source: United States census records and Population Estimates Program data.

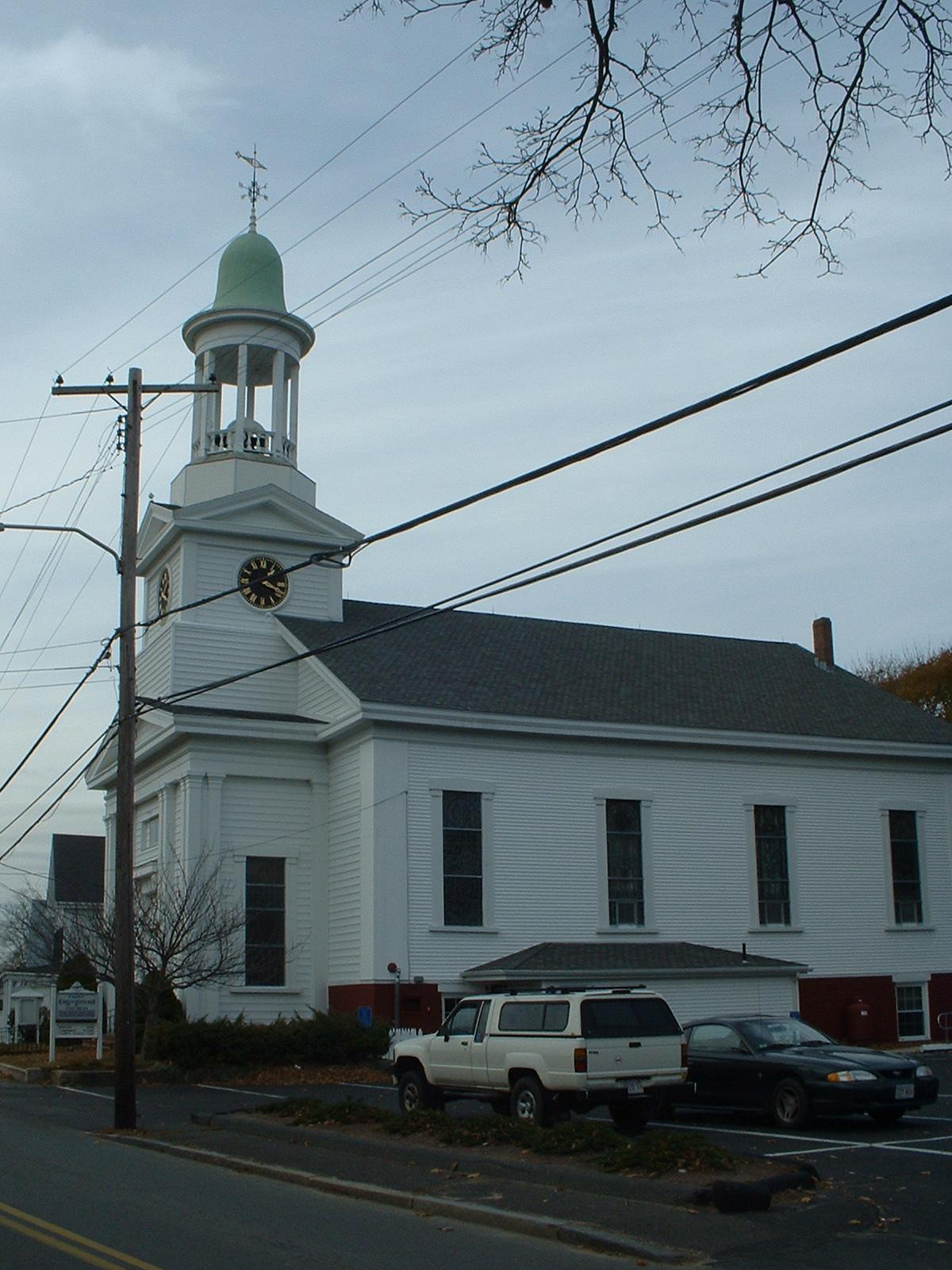
The First Congregational Church of Wellfleet. The clock tower (referred to as "Town Clock") is equipped with a ship's signal bell system.

As of the census of 2000, there were 2,749 people, 1,301 households, and 724 families residing in the town. The population density was 138.6 inhabitants per square mile (53.5/km^{2}). There were 3,998 housing units at an average density of 201.6 per square mile (77.8/km^{2}). The racial makeup of the town was 96.58% White, 0.95% African American, 0.29% Native American, 0.36% Asian, 0.04% Pacific Islander, 0.58% from other races, and 1.20% from two or more races. Hispanic or Latino of any race were 0.69% of the population.

There were 1,301 households, out of which 20.0% had children under the age of 18 living with them, 44.8% were married couples living together, 8.2% had a female householder with no husband present, and 44.3% were non-families. Of all households, 34.8% were made up of individuals, and 13.2% had someone living alone who was 65 years of age or older. The average household size was 2.11 and the average family size was 2.75.

In the town, the population was spread out, with 17.8% under the age of 18, 4.9% from 18 to 24, 23.3% from 25 to 44, 32.2% from 45 to 64, and 21.7% who were 65 years of age or older. The median age was 47 years. For every 100 females, there were 89.2 males. For every 100 females age 18 and over, there were 83.5 males.

The median income for a household in the town was $43,558, and the median income for a family was $50,990. Males had a median income of $38,100 versus $35,964 for females. The per capita income for the town was $25,712. About 5.7% of families and 7.5% of the population were below the poverty line, including 9.7% of those under age 18 and 6.0% of those age 65 or over.

== Government ==
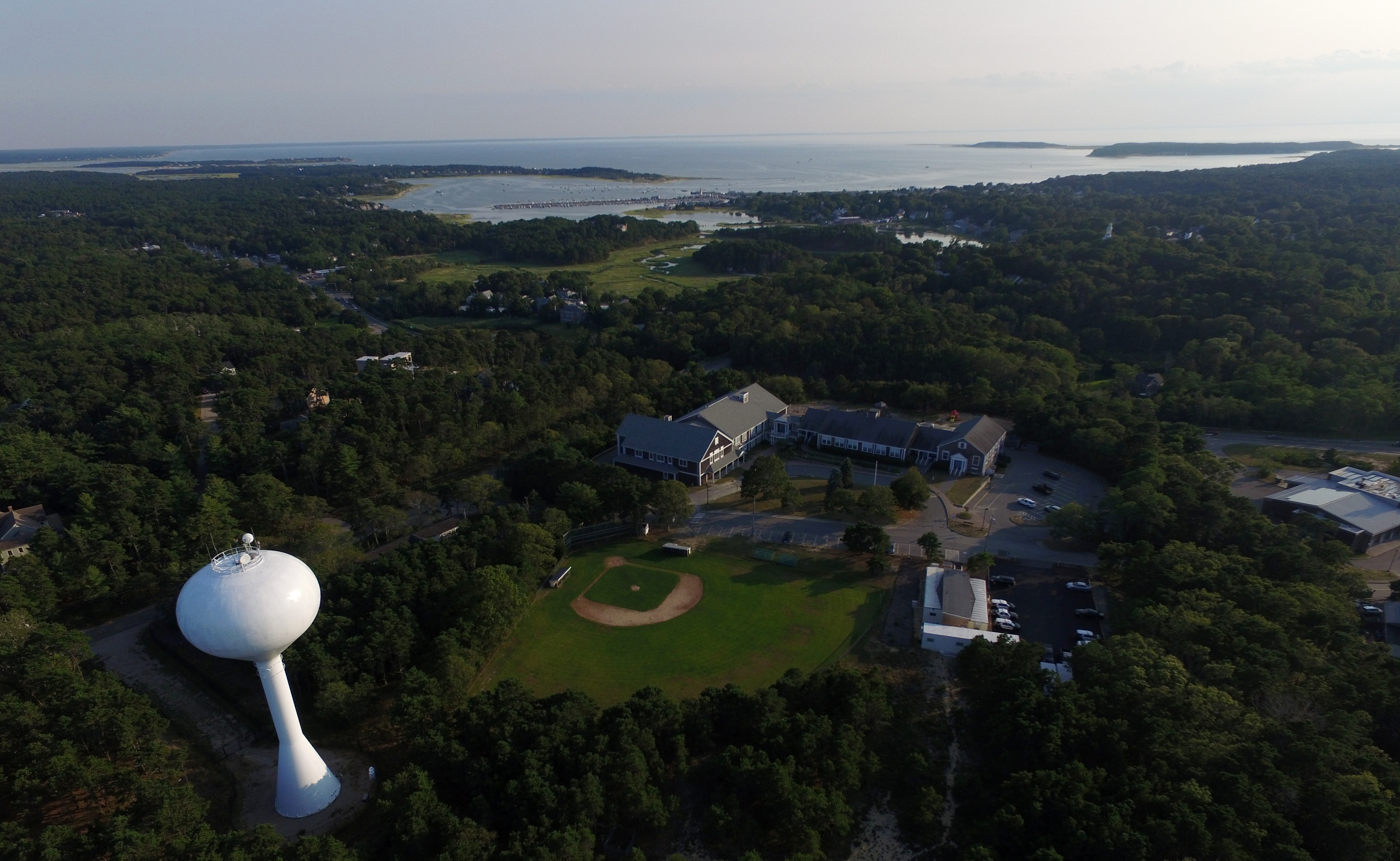
Aerial photo of Wellfleet Elementary, 2017

Wellfleet is represented in the Massachusetts House of Representatives as a part of the Fourth Barnstable district, which includes (with the exception of Brewster) all the towns east and north of Harwich on the Cape. The town is represented in the Massachusetts Senate as a part of the Cape and Islands District, which includes all of Cape Cod, Martha's Vineyard and Nantucket except the towns of Bourne, Falmouth, Sandwich and a portion of Barnstable. Wellfleet is patrolled by the Second (Yarmouth) Barracks of Troop D of the Massachusetts State Police.

On the national level, Wellfleet is a part of the 9th congressional district, currently represented by Bill Keating. The state's senior (Class I) member of the United States Senate, elected in 2012, is Elizabeth Warren. The junior (Class II) senator, elected on April 30, 2013, is Ed Markey.

Wellfleet is governed by the open town meeting form of government and a board of selectmen, who employ a town administrator to oversee day-to-day business. The town has its own police and fire departments, headquartered on Route 6 near the town center. There are two post offices, and both are also located along Route 6. The Wellfleet Public Library is located in the town center, in a former curtain and candle factory converted in 1989.

== Education ==
Wellfleet, Brewster, Truro, Provincetown, Eastham and Orleans make up the Nauset Regional School District. Each town operates its own elementary schools, with a regional middle school and high school accepting the students of all four towns. Wellfleet Elementary School is located just off Route 6 near the town center, and serves students from kindergarten to fifth grade. The Nauset Regional Middle School is located in Orleans, and the Nauset Regional High School is located in neighboring Eastham. There are no private schools in Wellfleet; high school students may, however, choose to attend Cape Cod Regional Technical High School in Harwich free of charge.

== Notable people ==
- Martha Atwood, soprano
- Lorenzo Dow Baker, entrepreneur, pioneer of the American commercialization of bananas
- Samuel Bellamy, pirate
- Berry Berenson, actress, photographer, model; victim of September 11 attacks
- William Birenbaum (1923–2010), college administrator who served as president of Antioch College
- Marcel Breuer, architect
- Serge Chermayeff, architect
- Mike DeVito, NFL player for nine seasons
- Edwin Dickinson, artist
- John Dos Passos, writer
- Janet Doub Erickson, co-founder of the Blockhouse of Boston, artist, and author
- Gilbert Franklin, sculptor, educator
- Xavier Gonzalez, artist
- Bernard Greenhouse, cellist
- John M. Johansen, architect
- Allen Kurzweil, writer
- Robert Jay Lifton, psychiatrist, author
- Guglielmo Marconi, technology pioneer
- Mary McCarthy, writer
- William McFeely, historian
- Anthony Perkins, actor, singer, director
- Marge Piercy, poet
- Jane Piper (1916–1991), artist
- Stephen Russell, actor, theater director
- Arthur Schlesinger, Jr., historian
- Arturo Vivante, writer
- Alec Wilkinson, writer
- Edmund Wilson, literary critic
- Howard Zinn, historian

== See also ==
- Wellfleet Drive-In Theater

National Register of Historic Places listings in Wellfleet:

- Ahearn House and Summer House
- Anthony and Allison Sirna Studio
- John Newcomb House
- Marcel Breuer House and Studio
- Paul and Madeleine Weidlinger House
- Peter Kugel House
- Pond Hill School
- Rowell House
- Ruth and Robert Hatch Jr. House
- Samuel and Minette Kuhn House
- Samuel Smith Tavern Site
- Saunders–Paine House
- Townsend House
- Vera and Laszlo Tisza House
