= List of drive-in theaters =

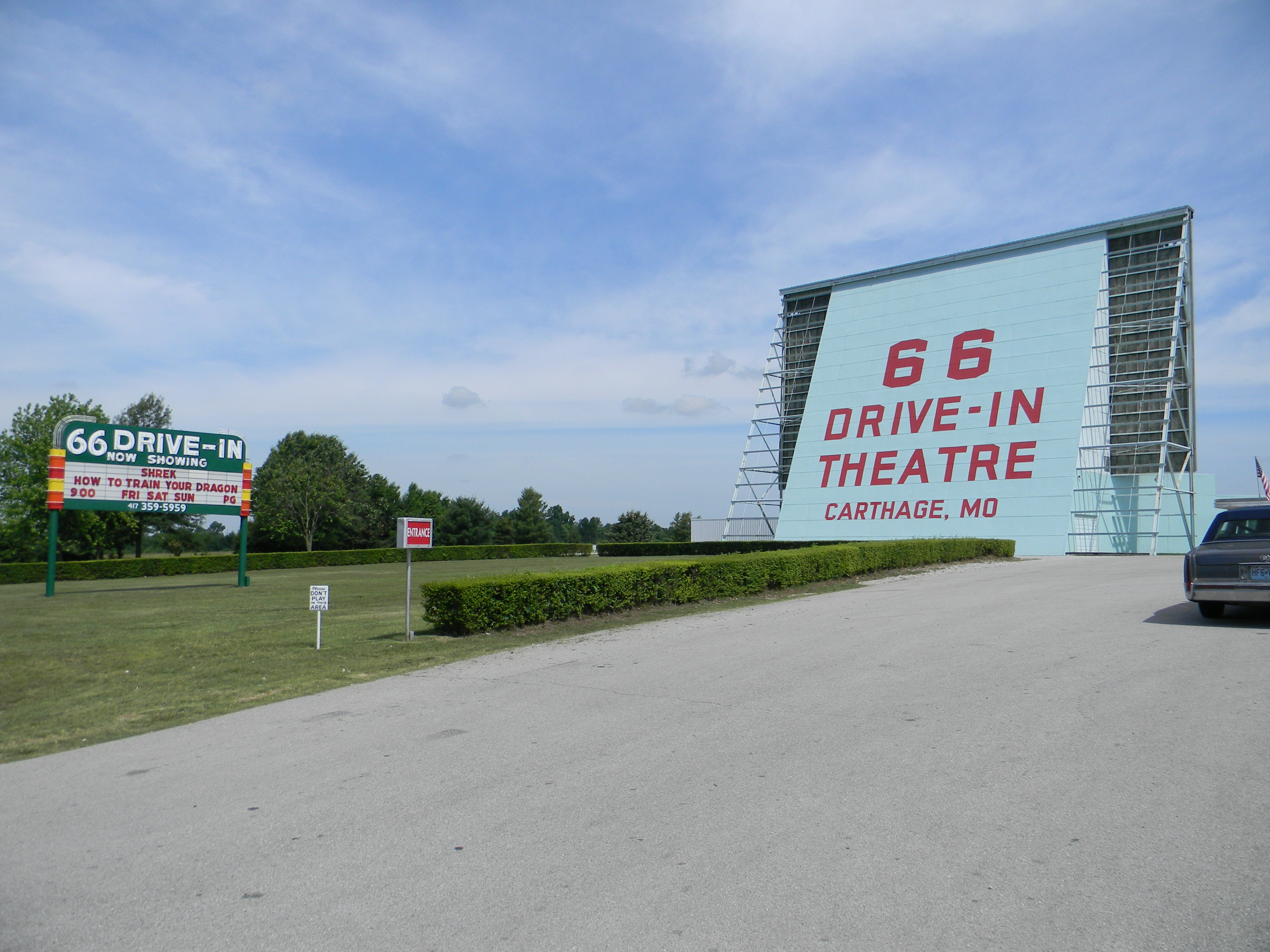
Signage for 66 Drive-In, Carthage, Missouri

This is a list of drive-in theaters. A drive-in theater is a form of cinema structure consisting of a large outdoor movie screen, a projection booth, a concession stand, and a large parking area for automobiles. Within this enclosed area, customers can view films from their cars.

This list includes active and defunct drive-in theaters.

== Drive-in theatres ==
=== Australia ===
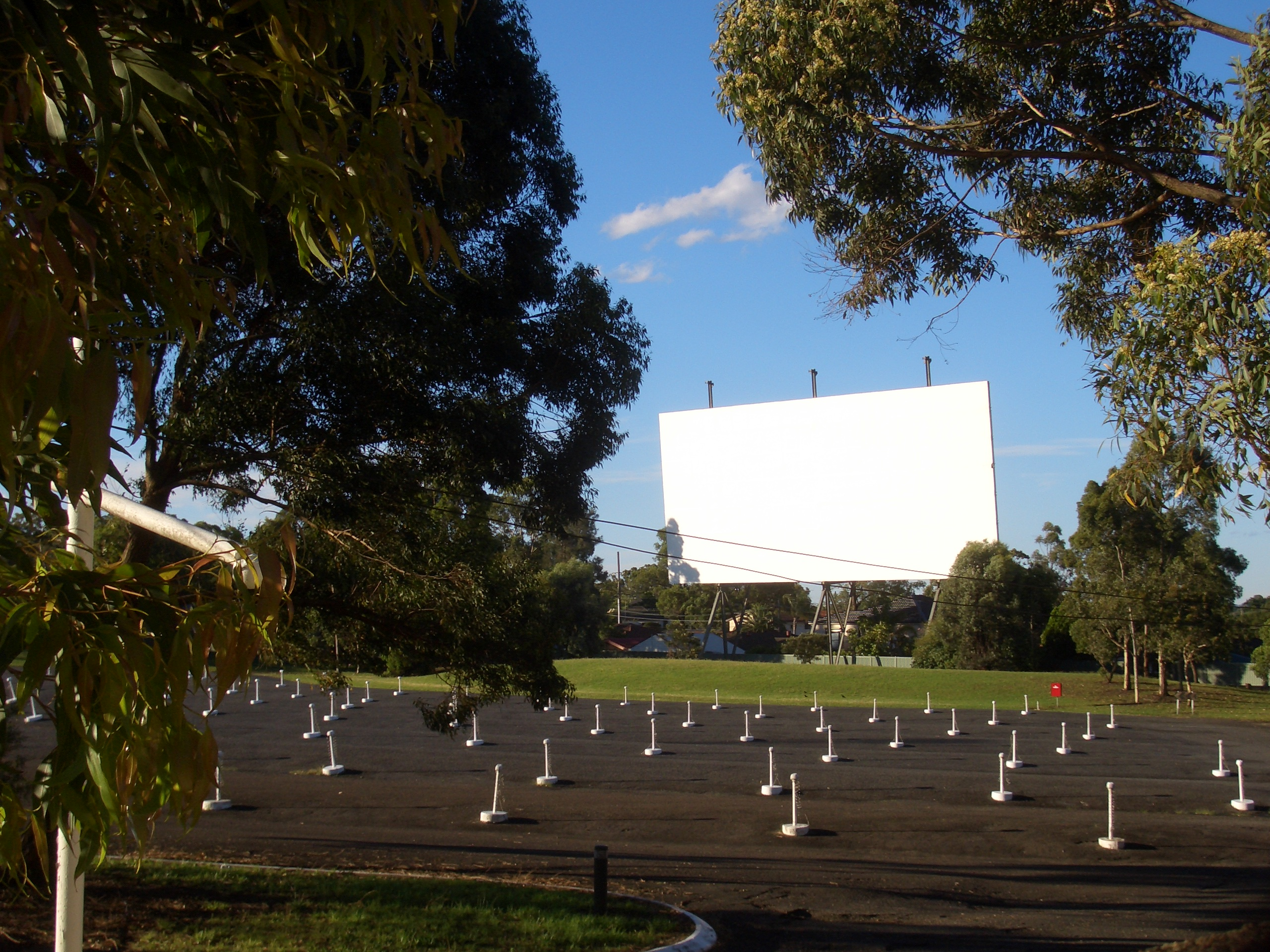
Bass Hill Drive-In Cinema in New South Wales, Australia

About 330 drive-in theatres were established in Australia, following the Skyline, established in 1954 in Melbourne.

=== United States ===
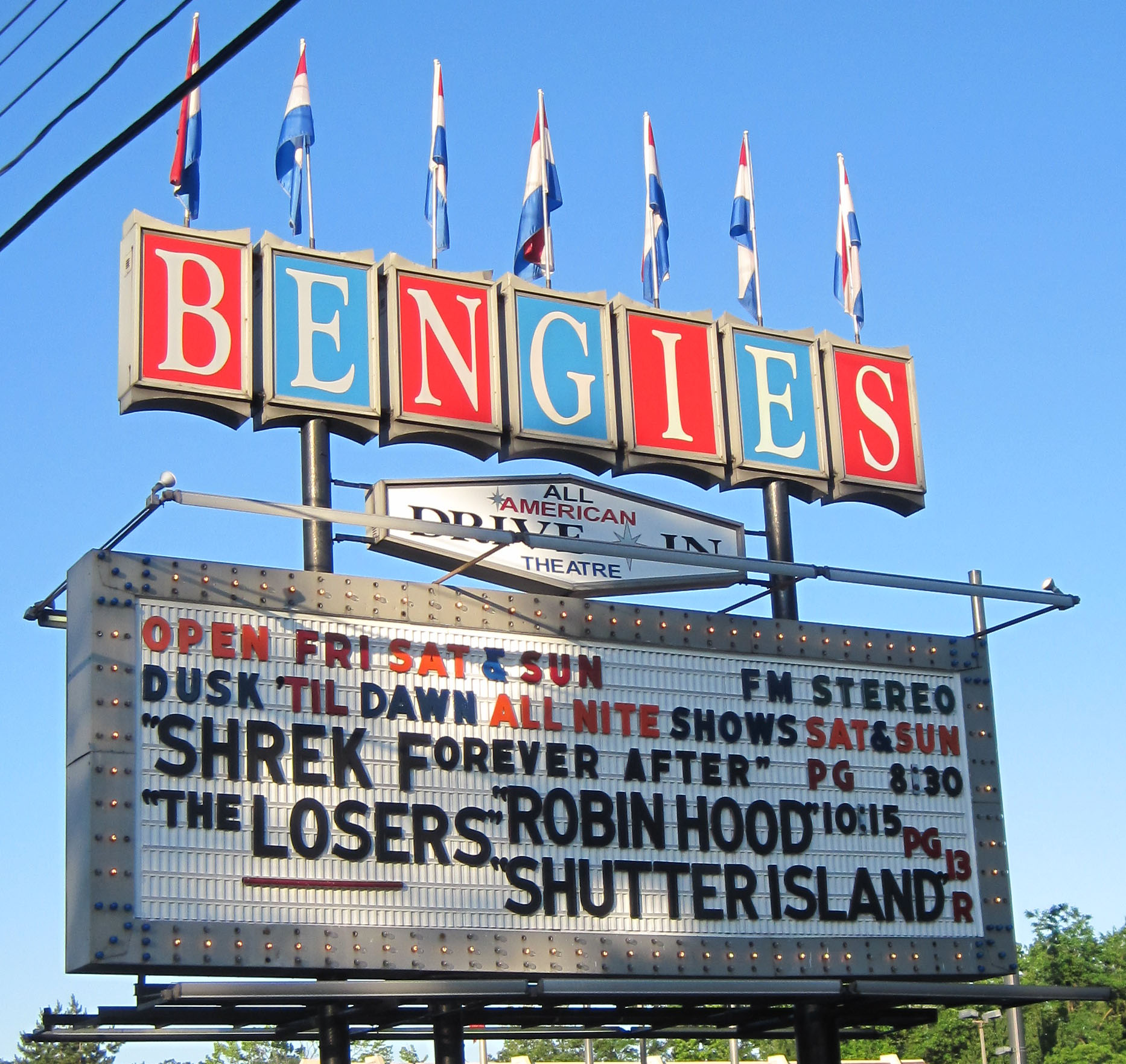
Bengies Drive-In Theatre in Middle River, Maryland

The first drive-in was opened in 1933 in New Jersey. As of 2017, around 330 drive-in theaters were operating in the United States, down from a peak of around 4,000 in the late 1950s. At least six are listed on the National Register of Historic Places (NRHP).^{[NRHP]} Notable U.S. examples include:

List of drive-in theatres in the United States
Name	City	State	Founded	Defunct	Remarks	Reference
66 Drive-In	Carthage on U.S. Route 66	Missouri	1949		^{[NRHP]}	
88 Drive-In	Commerce City	Colorado	1971			
Auto-Vue Drive-In Theatre	Colville	Washington	1954		Last Drive-in in Eastern Washington.	
Bengies Drive-In Theatre	Middle River	Maryland	1956			
Beverly Drive-In Theatre	Forrest County	Mississippi	1948	2010	^{[NRHP]}	
Boulevard Drive-In Theater	Allentown	Pennsylvania	1949	1985		
Cherry Bowl Drive-In Theatre & Diner	Honor	Michigan	1953			
Cumberland Drive-In	Newville	Pennsylvania	1952			
Historic Route 11 Drive-In Theatre	Stephens City	Virginia	1956			
Fort Lauderdale Swap Shop	Fort Lauderdale	Florida	1963	2023	14 screens	
Hull's Drive In	Lexington	Virginia	1950			
Kanopolis Drive-in Theatre	Kanopolis	Kansas	1952			
King Drive-In	Russellville	Alabama	1949	2023		
Mahoning Drive-In Theater	Lehighton	Pennsylvania	1949			
Mendon Twin Drive-In	Mendon	Massachusetts	1954			
Midway Drive-In	Sterling	Illinois	1950			
Midway Drive-In	Ravenna	Ohio	1955			
Midway Drive-In	Quitaque	Texas	1955	2011		
Moonlite Theatre	Abingdon	Virginia	1949	2013	^{[NRHP]}	
Route 35 Drive-In	Hazlet	New Jersey	1956	1991		
Shankweiler's Drive-In Theatre	Orefield	Pennsylvania	1934			
Silvermoon Drive-in	Lakeland	Florida	1948			
Spud Drive-In Theater	Driggs	Idaho	1953		Features a giant potato ^{[NRHP]}	
Wellfleet Drive-In Theater	Wellfleet	Massachusetts	1957			
Ford-Wyoming Drive-In	Dearborn	Michigan	1950			

== Gallery ==
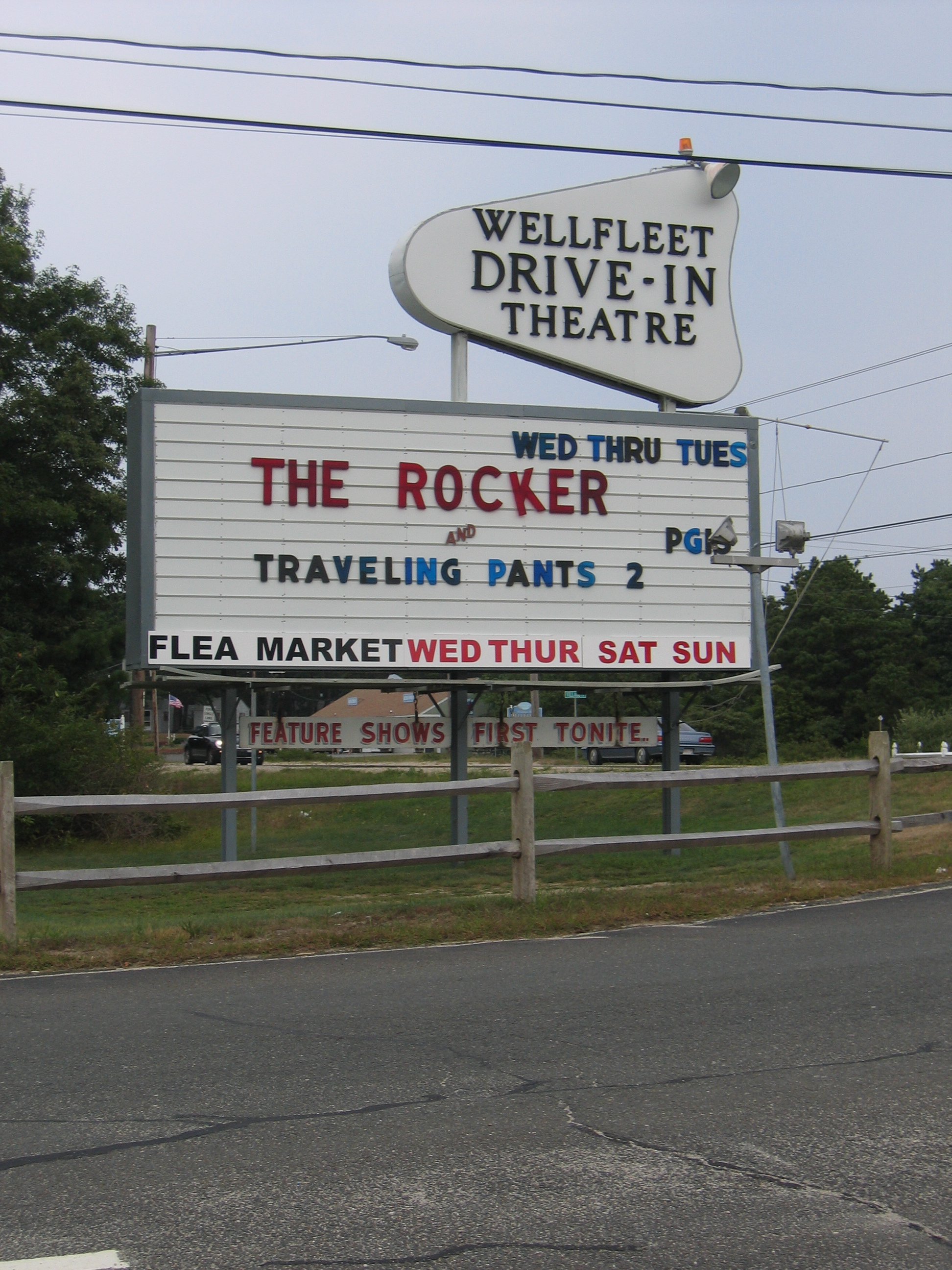
The entrance of Wellfleet Drive-In Theater in Wellfleet, Massachusetts, August 2008

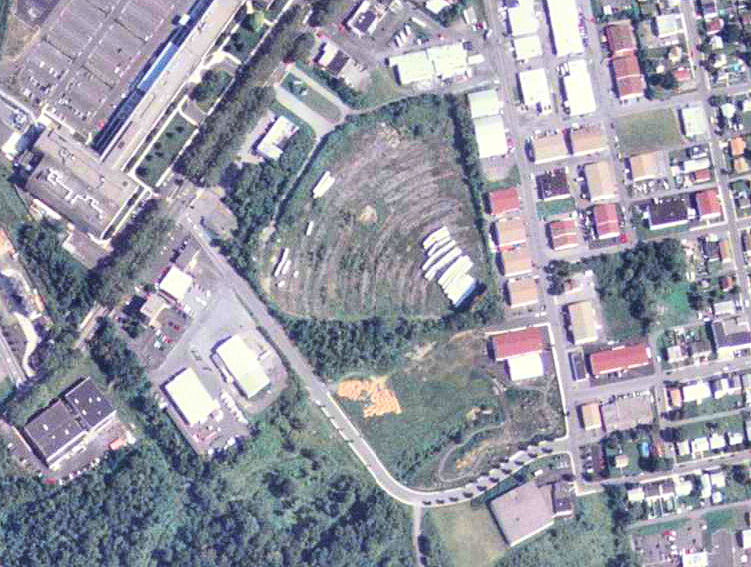
In this 2006 USGS airphoto, the defunct Boulevard Drive-In Theater can still be seen in a pie-shaped lot.

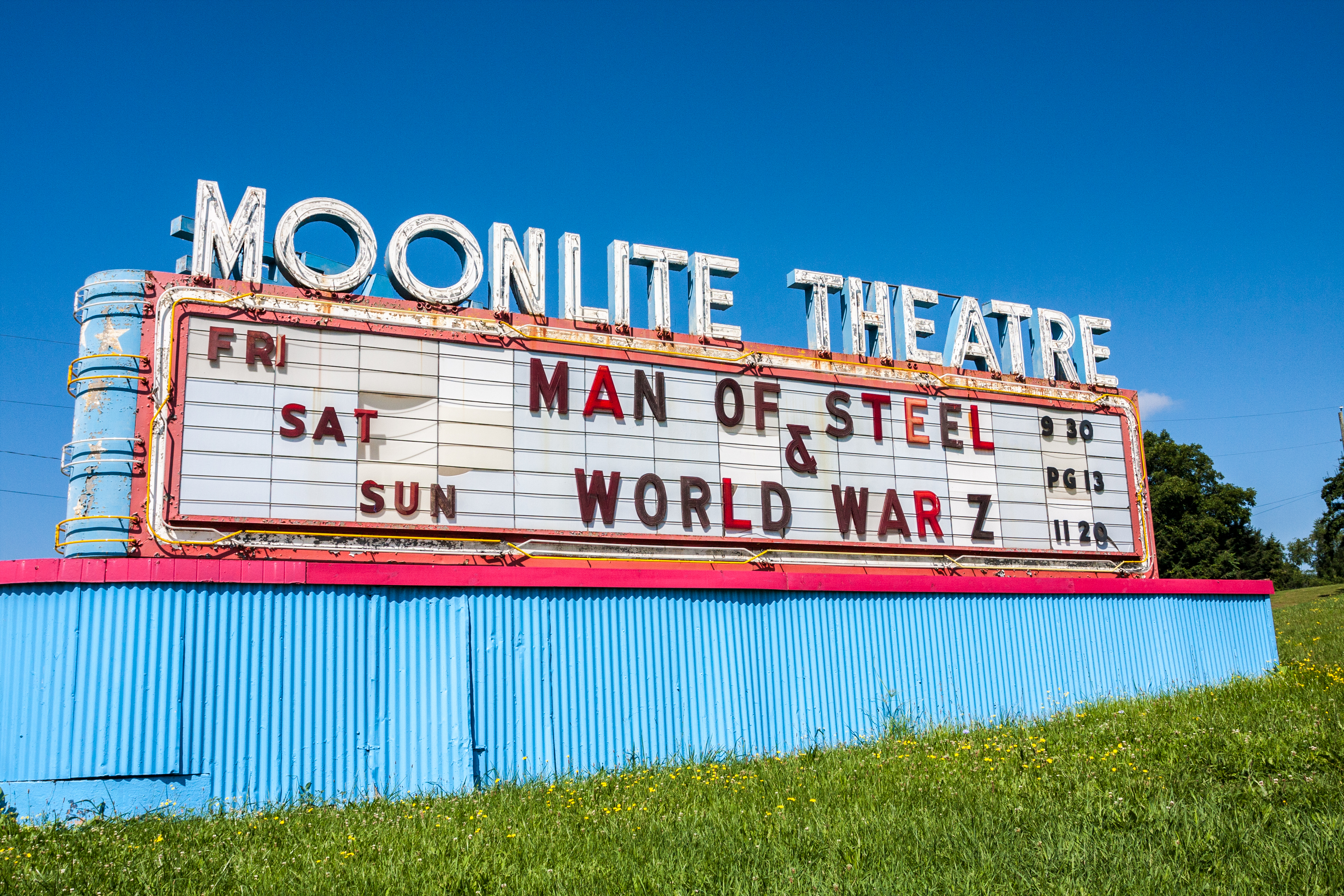
Signage at the Moonlite Theatre, July 2013

== See also ==
- Mobmov, mobile, drive-up movie theatre
- Drive-in theater Revival, for other guerrilla drive-in operations
- Inflatable movie screen
