= Midway Drive-In =

Midway Drive-In may refer to:

- Midway Drive-In (Illinois)
- Midway Drive-In (Ohio)
- Midway Drive-In (Texas)
