= Moonlite Theatre =

Historic theater in Washington County, Virginia, US

- U.S. National Register of Historic Places
- Virginia Landmarks Register
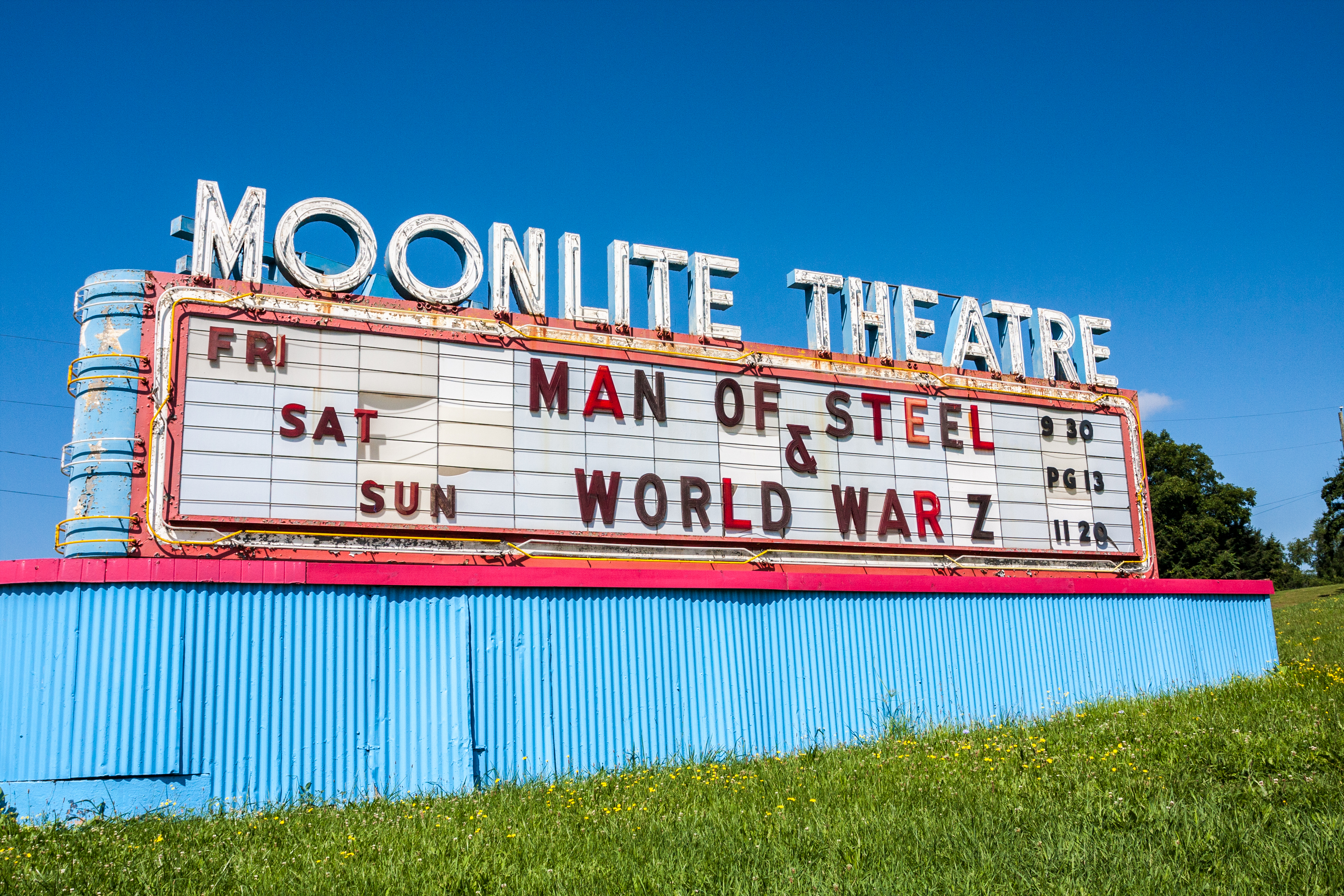
- Moonlight Theatre, July 2013

- Location within Virginia Location within the United States
- Location: 17555 Lee Highway, near Abingdon, Virginia
- Coordinates: 36°40′26″N 82°03′00″W
- Area: 13.3 acres (5.4 ha)
- Built: 1949
- Architectural style: Drive-in theatre
- NRHP reference No.: 07000802
- VLR No.: 095-5256

Significant dates
- Added to NRHP: August 8, 2007
- Designated VLR: June 6, 2007

The Moonlite Theatre, also known as the Moonlite Drive-In, is a historic drive-in theater located near Abingdon, Washington County, Virginia. It was built by businessman TD Field (Thomas Dewey)who owned multiple business and theatres including TD Field Lumber Company in Concord, NC. Some of the theatres he owned were The Beacon in Bristol, TN; Clinch Theatre in Tazwell, VA; Lee Theatre in Bluefield, VA; Midway Theatre in Keen Mountain, VA; and Valley Theatre in North Tazwell, VA. He may have also owned Zephyr Theatre in Abingdon, VA (which is now an antique store) and Coal Town Theatre. The first movie to ever play at the Moonlite was on June 9, 1949 called "Down To Earth" starring Rita Hayworth and Larry Parks. The Moonlite boasted a playground and a 19 hold miniature golf course. In the early 1960's (1964 or 1965) the Moonlite was purchased by Walter and Beulah Mays (affectionately known as Whitey and Boots). In 1992 they sold the Moonlite to William Ottway Booker who owned it until his death in 2017. The Moonlite remained one of the few drive-ins still open in Virginia until finally closing in 2013. The theater reopened briefly in 2016 but closed shortly after due to a pending lawsuit. Remaining original buildings and structures include the 55-foot-tall screen tower and office wing, the ticket booth, the concession stand/projector booth building, and the neon-illuminated attraction board at the edge of the highway. The theatre includes 454 parking/viewing spaces designed as reverse-incline ramps.

== Background ==
The Moonlite was listed on the Virginia Landmarks Register and the National Register of Historic Places in 2007, and was one of few drive-in theaters nationwide to be awarded that distinction. (Note: NRHP-listed drive-ins include 66 Drive-In, Beverly Drive-In Theatre, Moonlite Theatre, and Spud Drive-In Theater.)

The theater closed in 2013 and was in danger of being lost due to neglect. Some renovation work was begun in late 2016 under an agreement establishing joint ownership of the theater and through monetary and labor contributions from private individuals. Although these were not yet complete, it re-opened and began showing its traditional week-end double features in October 2016.

As of March, 2017, the agreement that led to the renovations has come under dispute and a lawsuit was filed. Before that could be settled, the long time owner passed away.

Beginning in 2020, the Barter Theatre started producing plays and staging them at the Moonlite Theatre due to the COVID-19 pandemic. Plays performed on a stage were simultaneously projected into the big screen, and audio was provided through FM radio. The Barter also put on a summer concert series at the drive-in during 2021.

In April of 2024, the Moonlite was purchased by new owners and underwent a 15 month major renovation project aimed at revitalizing the space while preserving its original charm. The business officially reopened July 18, 2025 with updated amenities, a 35,000 lumen laser projector, and a refreshed design that reflects a retro-inspired aesthetic.

The renovation included updated interior and exterior finishes, improved customer facilities, and the restoration of several vintage elements to pay homage to the business’s historical roots. Modern systems were installed for energy efficiency and comfort, while decor choices and furnishings drew inspiration from mid-century and classic Americana design.

These improvements were part of a broader effort to enhance the overall guest experience while maintaining the nostalgic atmosphere that made the Moonlite Drive-In Theatre a local favorite. The reopening has been met with positive community feedback and renewed interest from both returning and new patrons.

== See also ==
- List of drive-in theaters
