= Brian Kennedy =

Brian Kennedy may refer to:

- Brian Kennedy (businessman), British businessman, majority owner of the Sale Sharks Rugby Union Club
- Brian Kennedy (gallery director) (born 1961), art gallery director, director of the Peabody Essex Museum, Salem, Mass, USA
- Brian Kennedy (journalist) (died 1991), journalist and activist who helped set up the London Lesbian and Gay Centre in 1985
- Brian Kennedy (singer) (born 1966), Irish singer-songwriter and author
- Brian K. Kennedy (born 1967), American biologist
- Brian Patrick Kennedy (born 1961), American state legislator in Rhode Island
- Brian Kennedy (hurler) (born 1992), Irish hurler
- Brian Kennedy (basketball), American college basketball coach
- Brian T. Kennedy (1934–2012), American politician in New Jersey
- Brian Kennedy (table tennis), English table tennis player
- Brian Kennedy (Gaelic footballer) (born 1998)
- Brian Kennedy (music producer) (born 1983), American record producer, songwriter, and multi-instrumentalist

== See also ==
- Bryan Kennedy (disambiguation)
