= Wellfleet =

Wellfleet may refer to:

Geography

- Wellfleet, Massachusetts, a town in Massachusetts
  - Wellfleet Center Historic District
- Wellfleet, Nebraska, a town in Nebraska

Other

- Camp Wellfleet, a former United States military training camp in Wellfleet, Massachusetts
- Wellfleet Communications, a former Internet router company
- Wellfleet Drive-In Theater, a drive-in cinema in Wellfleet, Massachusetts
- Wellfleet oyster, a name for the eastern oyster (Crassostrea virginica)
- Wellfleet Railroad Station, a former railroad station in Wellfleet, Massachusetts
