= Carroll Crest, Maryland =

Unincorporated community in Maryland, U.S.

Coordinates: 39°20′5″N 76°23′11″W

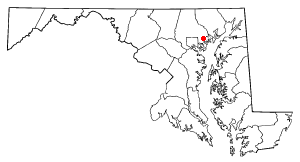
Carroll Crest Community located in Middle River, Maryland

Carroll Crest is an unincorporated community located in Middle River, Baltimore County, Maryland, United States. This community contains 233 houses secluded in a wooded area and was developed in two phases during the 1980s by Security Management. One of the roads leading into the community is Keeners Road. For years prior to the development of the community, it was known as Ghost Road and had been the supposed site of several supernatural occurrences. District 6 is the current legislative apportionment that includes Carroll Crest. Seneca Elementary and Chase Elementary are the local schools.
