= Bryan Kennedy =

Bryan Kennedy may refer to:

- Bryan Kennedy, founder of Mobmov
- Bryan Kennedy (politician), candidate in United States House of Representatives elections, 2004
- Bryan Kennedy (songwriter) on Mark Twain: Words & Music

== See also ==
- Brian Kennedy (disambiguation)
