= Boulevard Drive-In Theater =

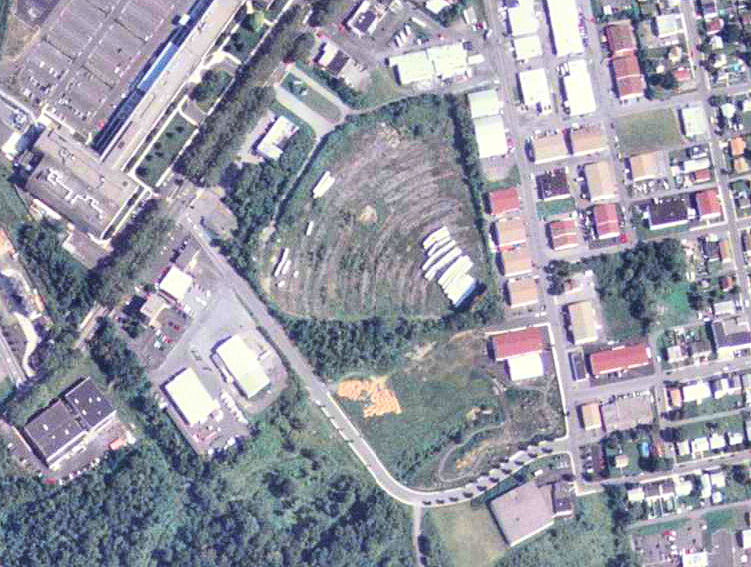
- The drive-in can still be seen in a pie-shaped lot, the gradient rows where cars would park clearly visible, 2006 USGS air photo.
- Interactive map of Boulevard Drive-In Theater
- Address: 556 Union Boulevard; Allentown, Pennsylvania, 18103; United States
- Coordinates: 40°37′13″N 075°27′00″W
- Type: Drive-In
- Current use: Abandoned

Construction
- Opened: 1949
- Closed: 1985

The Boulevard Drive-In Theater is a closed drive-in theater, located in Allentown, Pennsylvania. It was one of two drive-in theaters in Allentown; the second one was Cinema Treasures.

== History ==
Opened in 1949, the Boulevard was located on a 20-acre site in East Allentown, at 556 Union Boulevard, across the street from Western Electric. Like many drive-ins, the Boulevard was open from about April through the end of October of each year, being closed during the winter months. The theater opened about an hour before sunset each night, and normally showed two films on an average evening; the first being a first-run film, the second being either a "B" movie or a second-run film.

The theater was located on a hill, with gravel over the natural turf for automobiles to park. Each of the 600 parking spaces had a monaural speaker which was attached to the vehicle's driver side window. The speaker had a volume control to adjust the sound volume inside the car or light truck. There were no heaters supplied for the vehicles, and it was common for car engines to be running during the films in the early spring and late fall with the heaters running.

In the front of the parking area, a children's play area was provided with various swings, sliding boards, and other playground equipment for families to take children prior to dusk and the beginning of the film. A concession stand underneath the projection room was open with a wide variety of refreshments as well as restrooms.

== Closure and subsequent use ==
The Boulevard Drive-In closed about 1985 and the property was abandoned for many years. The ticket booth, projection/refreshment building and the metal speaker posts were torn down and removed about 1990.

In 2013, plans were announced to redevelop the site into a "classic car" exercise site, in which a mile-long track would be constructed to drive museum-class vehicles. The track is not planned for racing, but instead, a network of roads designed to test and maintain cars from the America on Wheels Museum. Development, sponsored by Nicola Bulgari, was completed sometime in 2015 and included preservation and restoration of the movie screen.

== See also ==
- List of historic places in Allentown, Pennsylvania
- List of drive-in theaters
