= Cumberland Drive-In =

Movie theater in Newville, Pennsylvania, US

Cumberland Drive-In Theater
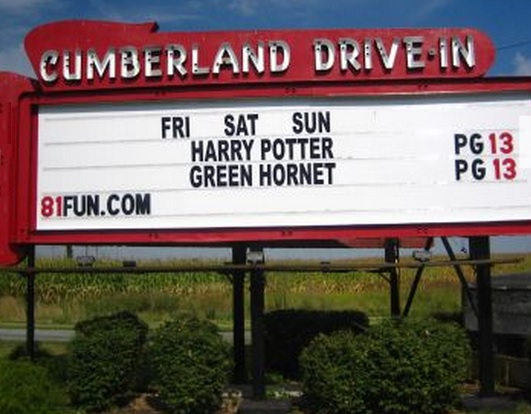
- Cumberland Drive-In Marquee
- Interactive map of Cumberland Drive-In Theater
- Address: 3290 Ritner Highway; Newville, Pennsylvania, 17241; United States
- Coordinates: 40°8′18″N 077°21′50″W
- Operator: The Mowery Family
- Capacity: 400 Vehicles
- Type: Drive-In
- Current use: In Operation

Construction
- Opened: 1952
- Years active: 61 as of 2013

Website
- http://81fun.com/drivein_home/

Cumberland Drive-In Theatre is an outdoors movie theater located near Newville, Pennsylvania in Penn Township. It is capable of hosting 400 vehicles and has a 45 by 96 foot movie screen. As of August 2013, it has been operated by the same family for over 60 years.

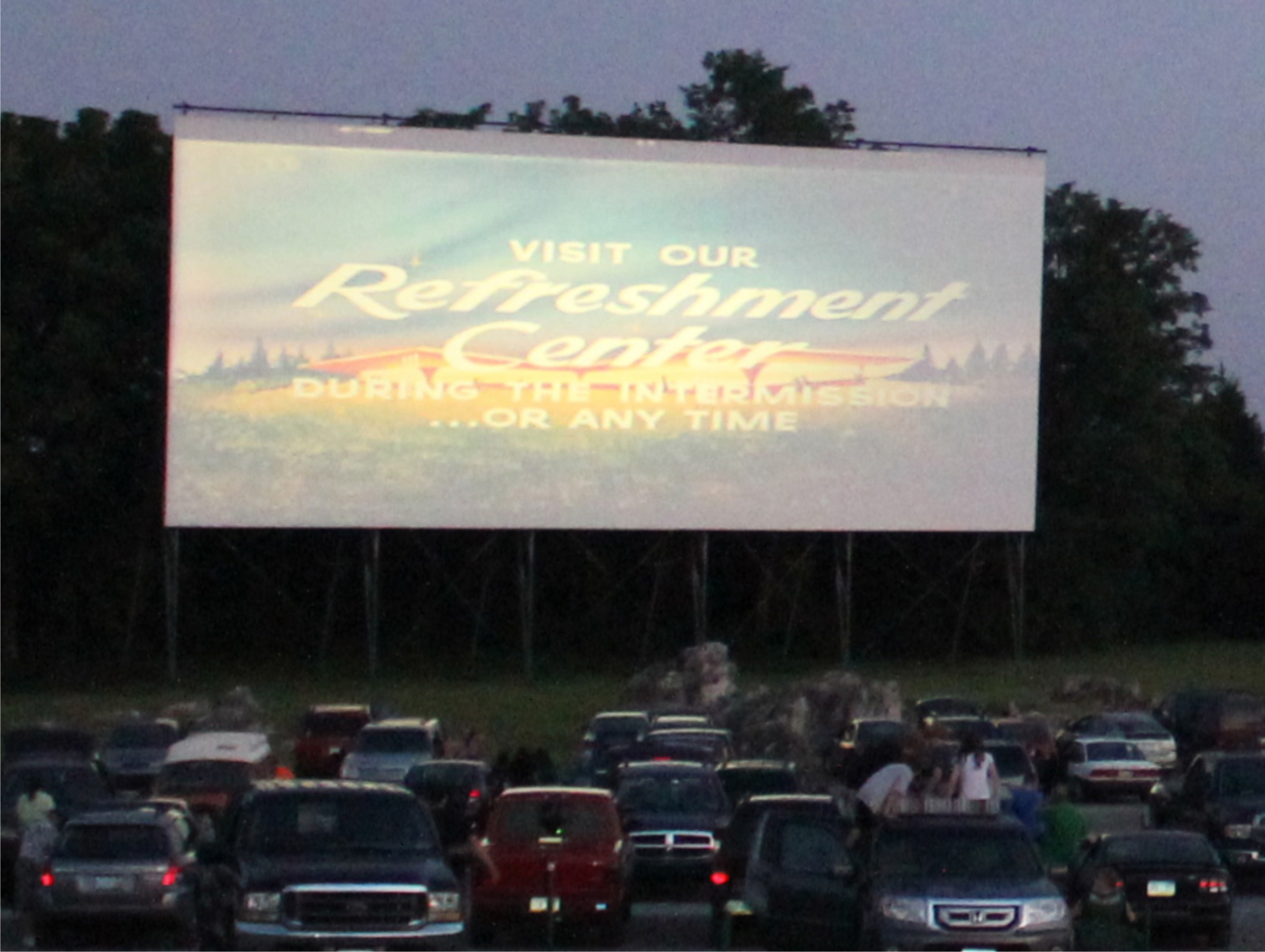
The welcome screen at Cumberland Drive-In Theater

== History ==
Cumberland Drive-In Theatre was opened by Donn Mowery on August 1, 1952 and celebrated its 60th anniversary in 2012. The first movie ever shown at Cumberland Drive-In was Annie Get Your Gun.

The theater was built just before the peak years of drive-in theater popularity. At the height of the drive-in culture there were over 4,000 drive-in theaters in the United States: 25% of the nation’s movie theaters. Today Cumberland Drive-In is one of 368 remaining drive-ins in the United States.

Its location is ideal in that it is close to Interstate 81 and U.S. Route 11, making it easily accessible. Even though it is near the area’s major highways, the drive-in is situated in a low-population area with dark skies. After the closure of Sunset Drive-In in nearby Chambersburg, the Cumberland Drive-In became the only drive-in theater to service Chambersburg, Hagerstown, MD and the surrounding area.

The Cumberland Drive-In Theatre features a snack bar and a large playground area. The theater is family friendly; most features are rated G, PG or PG-13, with R features typically showing in the latter part of the season.

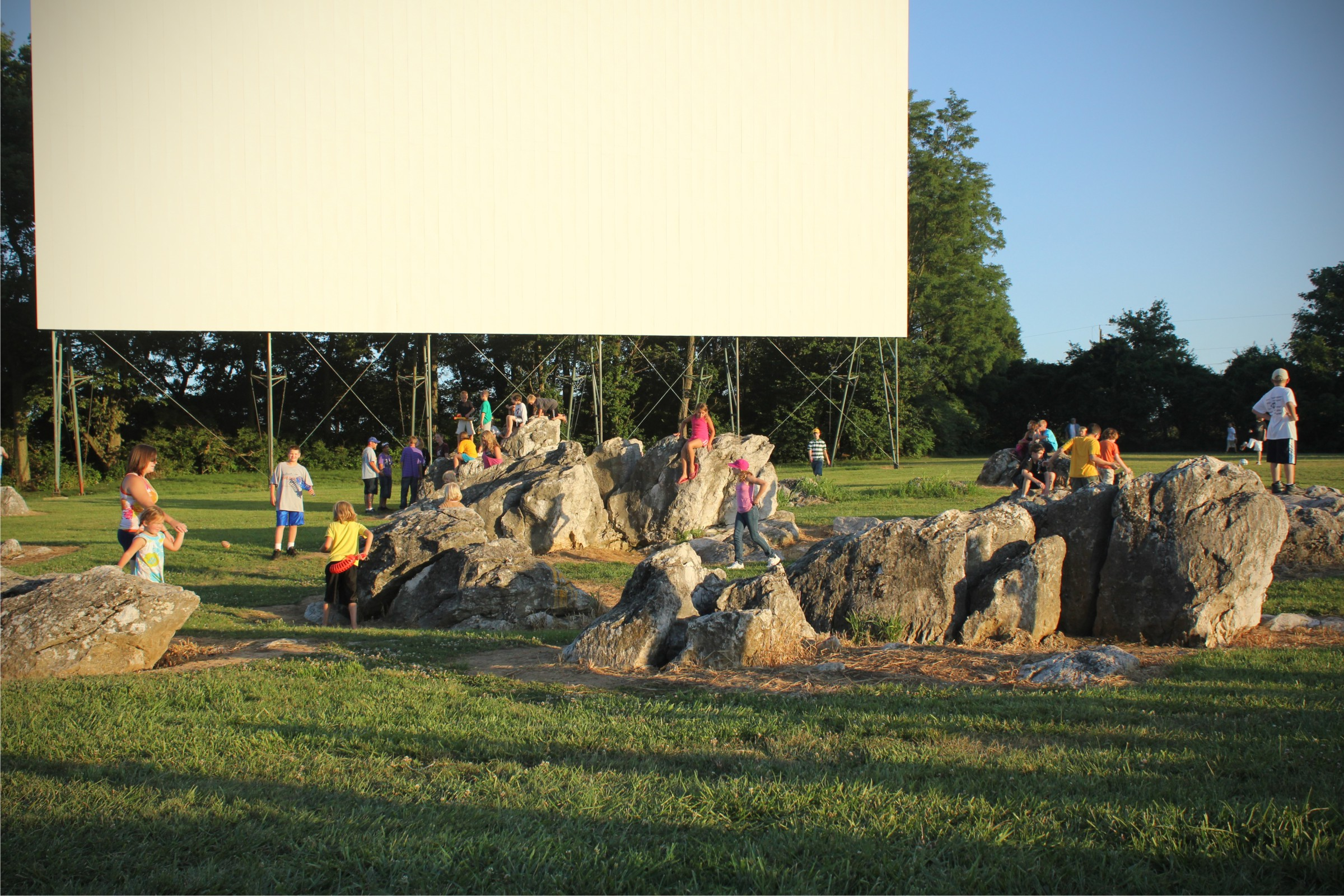
Children play while waiting for movie at Cumberland Drive In

The theater is one of 4 businesses of “81Fun” which includes Cumberland Drive-In, Midway Skating, Midway Bowling, and Cumberland Golf Club – all owned by the Mowery family.

== Digital versus 35 millimeter ==
In 2013, movie studios announced that they would be switching from 35 millimeter films to digital distribution –exclusively – by the end of the year. The average cost for an outdoor or single-screen theater to convert to digital projection is approximately $75,000.

As of 2013, Cumberland Drive-In was using the same movie projector it used in 1952. The only major change is that in 2003 the lamp houses were changed from carbon arc lamp to powerful light bulbs.

Ticket sales do not generate large sums of money for drive-in theaters such as the Cumberland Drive-In. Film companies claim most of the ticket price. Concession sales (food and drink) are the main source of profit for the Cumberland (and for most theaters). In addition, many drive-ins (such as the Cumberland) are only open in late spring and in summer. It may take 10-15 years for smaller drive-in theaters to pay for the new equipment. In order to survive, the theater competed for one of five digital projectors being donated by Honda as part of Project Drive-In.

Because of the switch to digital projection, a substantial number of the remaining drive-in theaters faced closing their doors after the summer season. As of August 2013, Honda was urging drive-in patrons to take advantage of social media (such as Facebook and Twitter) and texting in order to vote for their favorite theater.

Previous technology updates (movies downloaded from the Internet, cable television, etc.) cost the Cumberland Drive-In in terms of fewer visitors. The mandated switch to digital, however, is different: film companies are forcing drive-ins to change. Movies will no longer be available in cans of 35 mm film.

Despite the odds, co-owner Jay Mowery was optimistic, saying, “To say we're closing, I hope not. We'd have to explore our options. It would be great if we got this. We want to continue to provide family entertainment to the community and that means converting to digital. It's not only about the cars and drive-in movies; it's also about people's fond memories that date back to the 1950s”.

The Cumberland opened in the spring of 2014 to find a diminished pool of available celluloid prints, with many of the popular religious-themed features like Heaven Is for Real unavailable at all on film. Finally, on June 26, the drive-in made the changeover to digital. The first features shown on that Thursday night were Transformers: Age of Extinction and X-Men: Days of Future Past.

== See also ==
- List of drive-in theaters
