= Historic Route 11 Drive-In Theatre =

Drive-in movie theater in Virginia, USA

Coordinates: 39°4′13.60″N 78°14′00.28″W

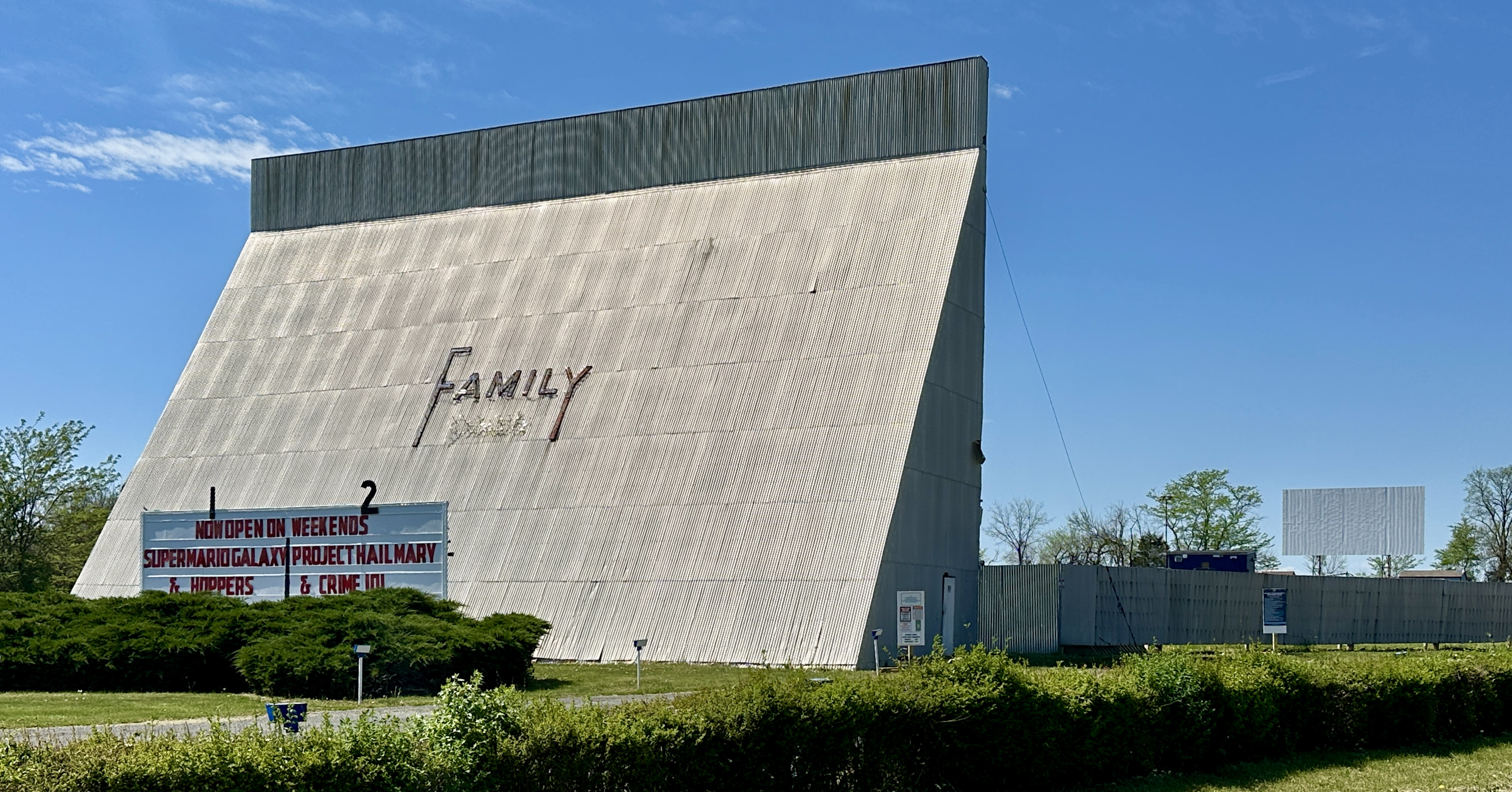
Historic Route 11 Drive-In Theatre in 2026

The Historic Route 11 Drive-In Theatre (previously known as the Family Drive-In Theatre) is an outdoor cinema located at 5890 Valley Pike (U.S. 11) one mile south of Stephens City, Virginia. The theater opened in 1956 and features two screens, each playing two films back-to-back. After failing to raise funds to save the theater, the Family Drive-In closed in 2025, but a few months later an investor announced plans to reopen the business in 2026. The previous owner refused to let the new owner continue using the Family-Drive-In Theatre name, so the business was rebranded to the Historic Route 11 Drive-In Theatre before its reopening. It is one of only six drive-in theaters still operating in Virginia.

== History ==
The Family Drive-In was built by William F. Dalke Jr. and opened on June 14, 1956. It was one of eight drive-in theaters within a 20 miles (32 km) radius at the time of its construction. The number of drive-in theaters in the United States peaked at around 4,000 in 1958 while in 2013, an estimated 360 still remained. Dalke Jr. had previously owned indoor theaters until opening Family Drive-In. He was able to keep the theater open with the assistance of his four sons, including Tim Dalke, who took over managing Family Drive-In when he returned from fighting in the Vietnam War.

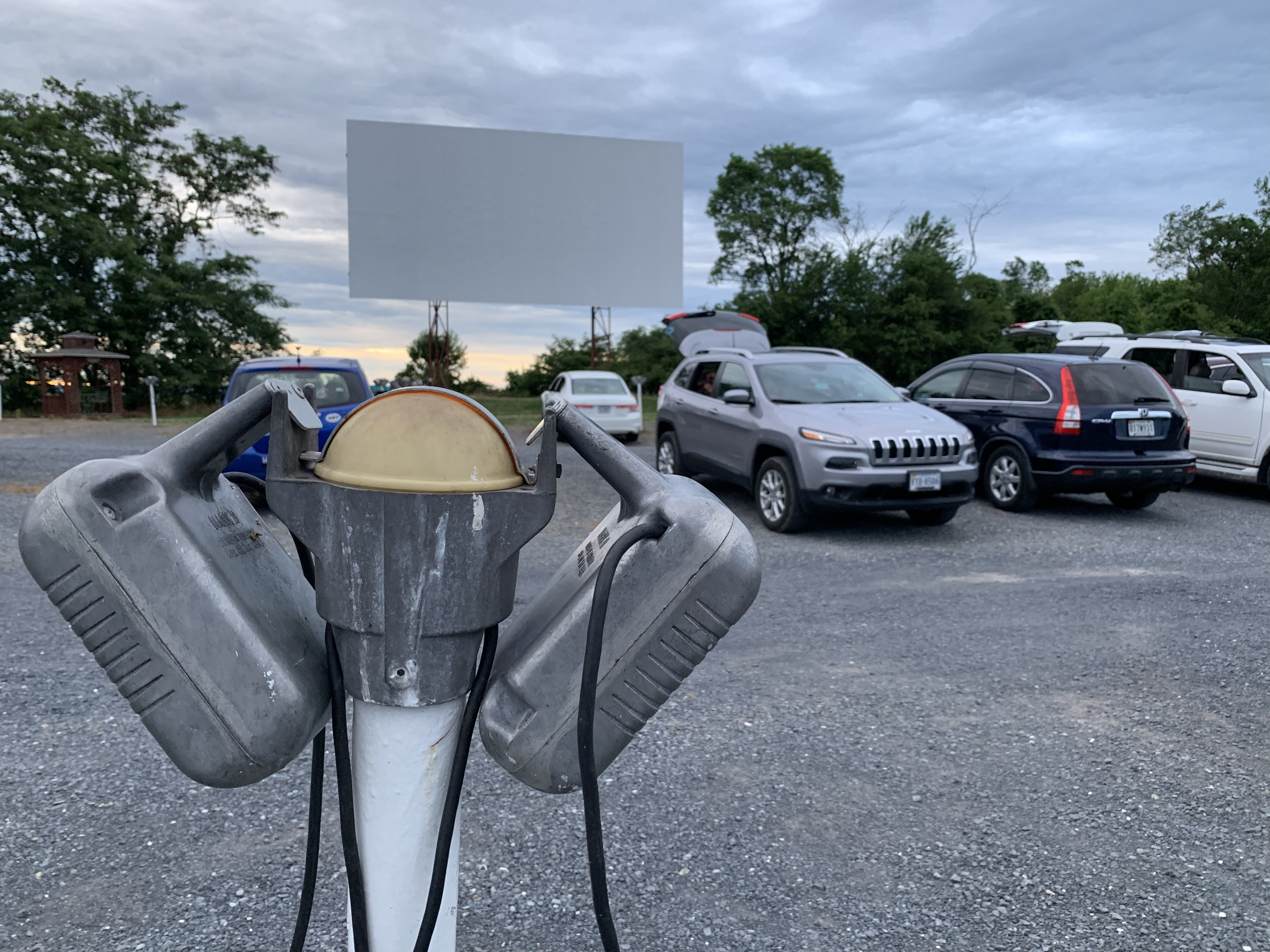
Each parking spot has a speaker that can be attached to the side of the vehicle.

Starting in 2009, manager James (Jim) Kopp, a self-professed "drive-in nut" and former Library of Congress employee, leased Family Drive-In from Tim Dalke. Kopp sat on the board of the United Drive-in Theatre Owners Association. He worked with a booking agent to get bargains on popular films. Second-run films were previously shown on both screens because they were cheaper to rent, but Family Drive-In started showing first-run movies in order to compete with standard theaters. Additional changes made by Kopp included hiring additional staff, expanding the theater's presence on social media, extending the operating season, and allowing customers to pay with credit cards.

Since film companies no longer offer many titles on 35 mm film, independent theaters face expensive upgrades to continue playing new digital films. Customers and the surrounding community donated $21,000 to help the theater, allowing Kopp to make a down payment to purchase new equipment, including new Christie projectors that cost around $120,000. The brightness and clarity from the new projectors allow customers to see details in films that weren't previously visible. Following the conversion, Family Drive-In was featured in a story by NBC Nightly News dealing with drive-ins having to choose between old and new ways of showing films.

On Labor Day weekend in 2013, the theater began playing digitally projected movies in a special dusk until dawn event. The event was organized to thank patrons for their donations in purchasing the new equipment. Family Drive-In also hosted special events like Civil War film nights, an annual Halloween Costume Party and Trunk-or-Treat, and a car show featuring classic vehicles and 1950s themed movies.

Kopp died in 2021 due to complications from COVID-19. Moonstruck River, a company based in Houston that operates several drive-in theaters, took over operations of the Family Drive-In following Kopp's death, and Ronald Graham became manager. A four-year lease was signed between Moonstruck River and Dalke's Theatres, Inc., which owned the 10.16 acres (0.4 ha) where the theater was located. Dalke's Theatres listed the property for sale in June 2025 for $1.5 million. Graham, patrons, and locals interested in preserving the theater attempted to raise funds to purchase the property but were unsuccessful. The theater closed on November 30, 2025.

A few months later, an investor purchased the property with plans for a management company to continue operating the theater beginning in spring 2026. In March 2026 the business was rebranded to the Historic Route 11 Drive-In Theatre after the previous owner refused to allow the new owner to continue using the Family Drive-In Theatre name, social media accounts, and various equipment. Graham continued as manager of the theater as well as being a new part owner. A party marking the theater's 70th anniversary took place in 2026. It is one of six remaining drive-in theaters in Virginia.

== Features ==
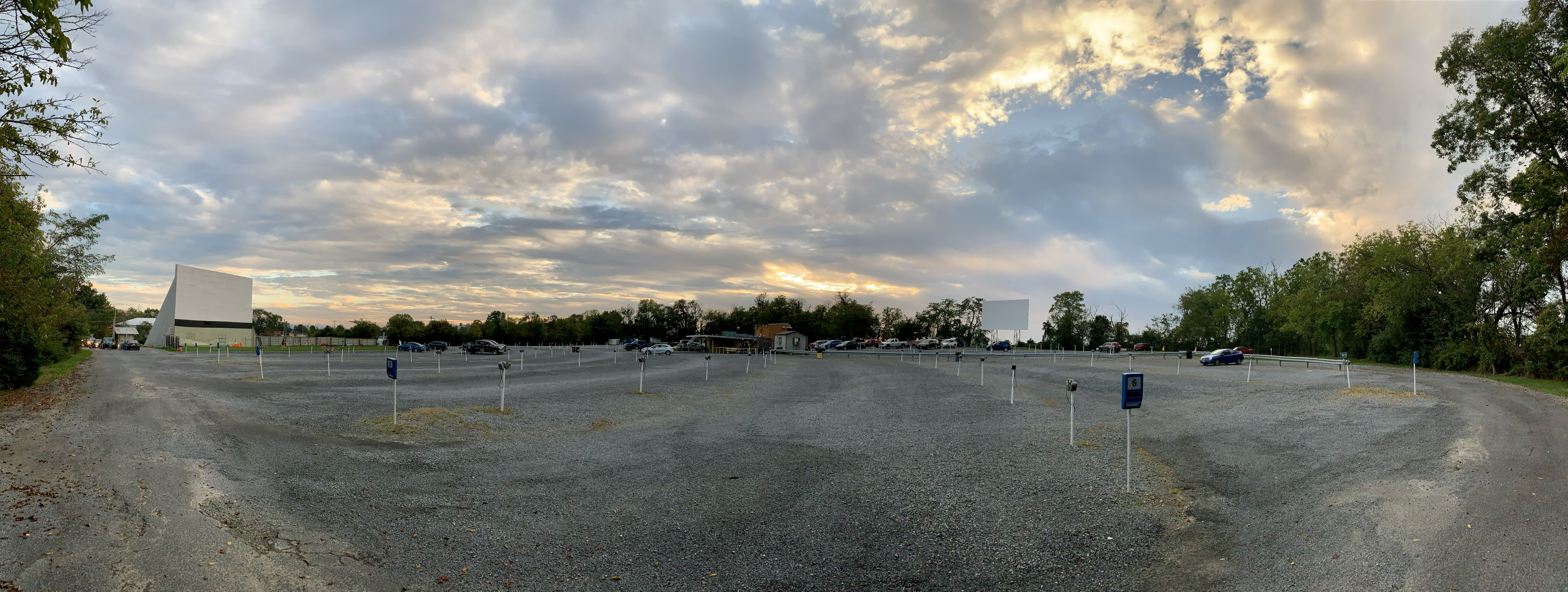
Panoramic view of the parking area and both screens

The Historic Route 11 Drive-In Theatre is open seven days a week from June to August, on the weekends in the spring and fall, and closed during the winter months. The 7.5 acres (3.0 ha) theater includes two screens playing first-run films, though older movies were sometimes play on one of the screens. The first screen is able to accommodate 240 cars while the smaller second screen, added in 1989, can accommodate 144. The double feature policy allows customers to pay one admission price and watch two-first run films. Retro music plays before the films begin and a playground is available for children. Customers are able to hear the film's audio by choosing between drive-in speakers on 4 feet (1.2 m) high poles or their car radio. According to Kopp, the speakers and poles are difficult to maintain since only one manufacturer still makes spare parts for them. When asked if he would ever remove them, Kopp said "Heck no. These classic speakers are part of the drive-in theater experience." A concession stand staffed by "cast members" sells various refreshments.

== See also ==
- List of drive-in theaters
