= SpudFest =

The SpudFest Family Film and Music Festival was an annual film festival which was established in Driggs, Idaho, U.S.A. in the summer of 2004 by Dawn Wells, the original Mary Ann from Gilligan's Island. It was founded as a natural outgrowth of the Idaho Film and Television Institute and Film Actors Boot Camp.

SpudFest is a "home to independent features, documentaries and short films by up-and-coming filmmakers making family films." Spud Drive-In Theater in Driggs, Idaho was the homebase for the film screenings, music performances and parties while and other screenings were held at Pierre's Playhouse in Victor, Centre Twin in Idaho Falls and Pond Student's Union at Idaho State University, Pocatello.

At SpudFest 2007, Dawn Wells presented Idaho Governor Butch Otter with the Idaho Visionary Award.

SpudFest was discontinued in 2008.
