= Midway Drive-In (Illinois) =

Midway Drive-In & Diner
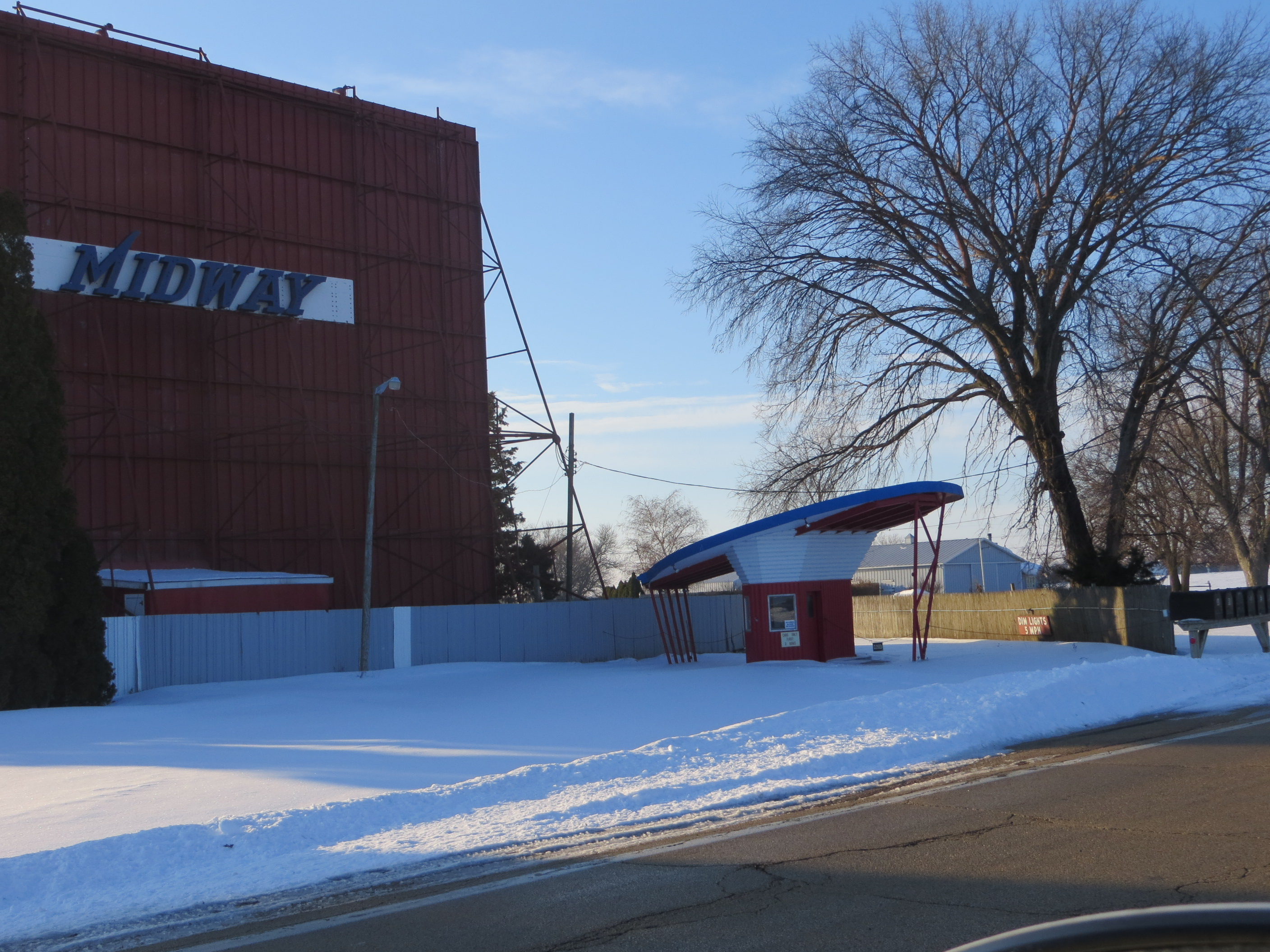
- Front entrance and back of screen
- Interactive map of Midway Drive-In & Diner
- Location: 91 Palmyra Avenue; Sterling, Illinois
- Coordinates: 41.839184°N 89.614175°W
- Seating type: Private vehicles
- Type: Drive-in theater

Construction
- Opened: 1950

Website
- themidwaydrivein.net

The Midway Drive-In located near Sterling, Illinois is one of 12 drive-in theaters in Illinois.

== History ==
In 2007, the Midway Drive-In was purchased by Mike and Mia Kerz (who are also the founders of the Flashback Weekend Movie Conventions in Rosemont, Illinois). The facility then underwent a two-year renovation. The historic Drive-In Screen Tower was refurbished and painted, the projection booth equipment was upgraded, and the concession stand was restored to its original '50's diner decor, including the retro "spaceship" ticket booth and the children's playground.

== See also ==
- List of drive-in theaters
