= 66 Drive-In =

- U.S. National Register of Historic Places
- U.S. Historic district
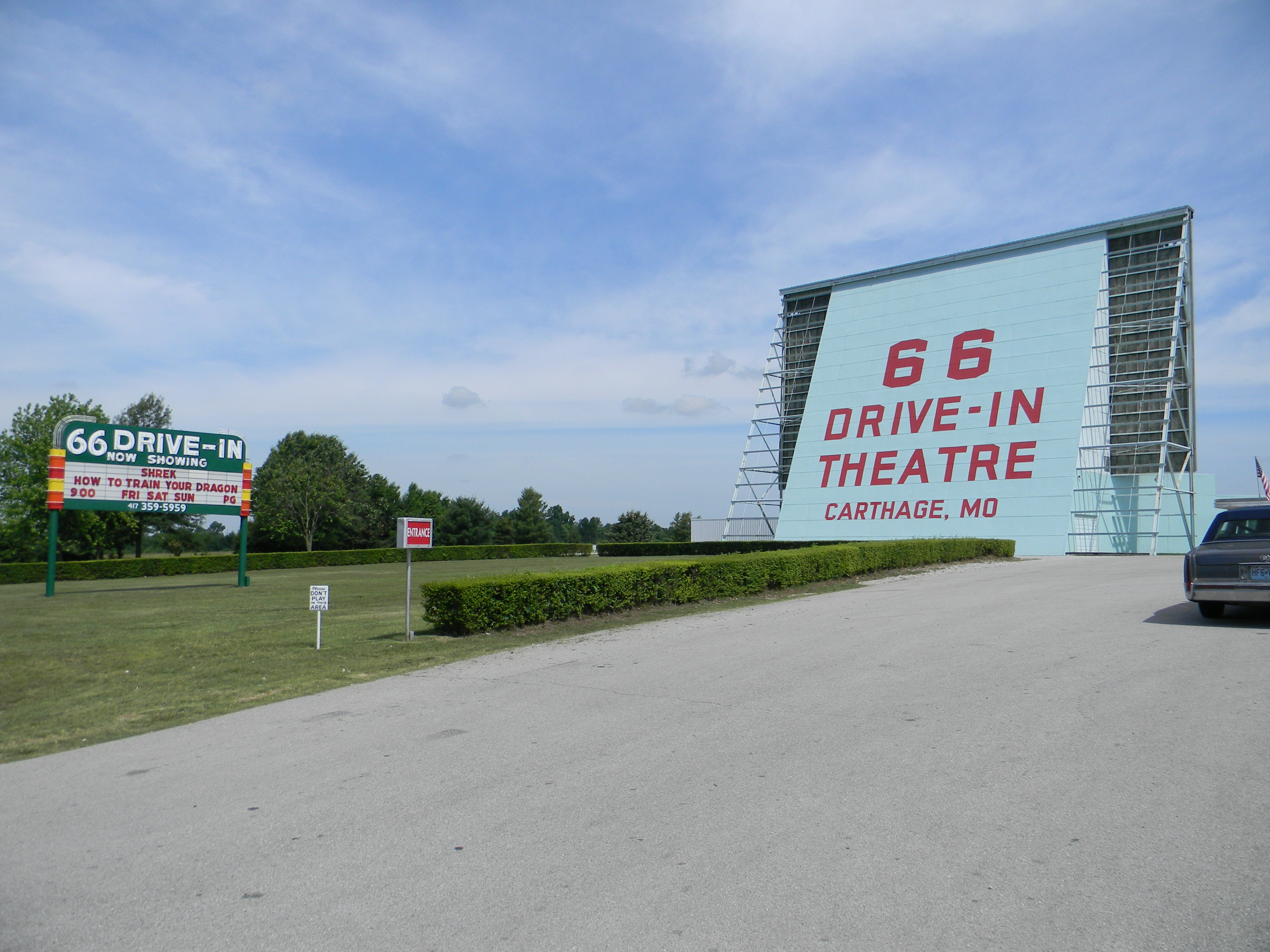

- Location within Missouri Location within the United States
- Location: 17231 Old 66 Blvd., Carthage, Missouri
- Coordinates: 37°10′24″N 94°22′06″W
- Area: 9 acres (3.6 ha)
- Built: 1949
- Built by: Ozark Engineering Co.
- Architectural style: Drive-In Theater, Art Deco / Streamline Moderne (ticket booth)
- MPS: U.S. Route 66 in Missouri
- NRHP reference No.: 03000182
- Added to NRHP: April 2, 2003

66 Drive-In is a historic drive-in theater national historic district located on U.S. Route 66 in Jasper County, Missouri near Carthage. The theater opened on September 22, 1949, four years before the first local television stations signed on in the Joplin-Springfield area. In an era before widespread adoption of transistors and before the invention of integrated circuits, car radios were not standard equipment in all vehicles. The few radios installed in vehicles were of vacuum tube design and power-hungry by modern standards. A series of poles in the car park of the nine-acre site were therefore deployed to hold loudspeakers so that viewers could hear the movie.

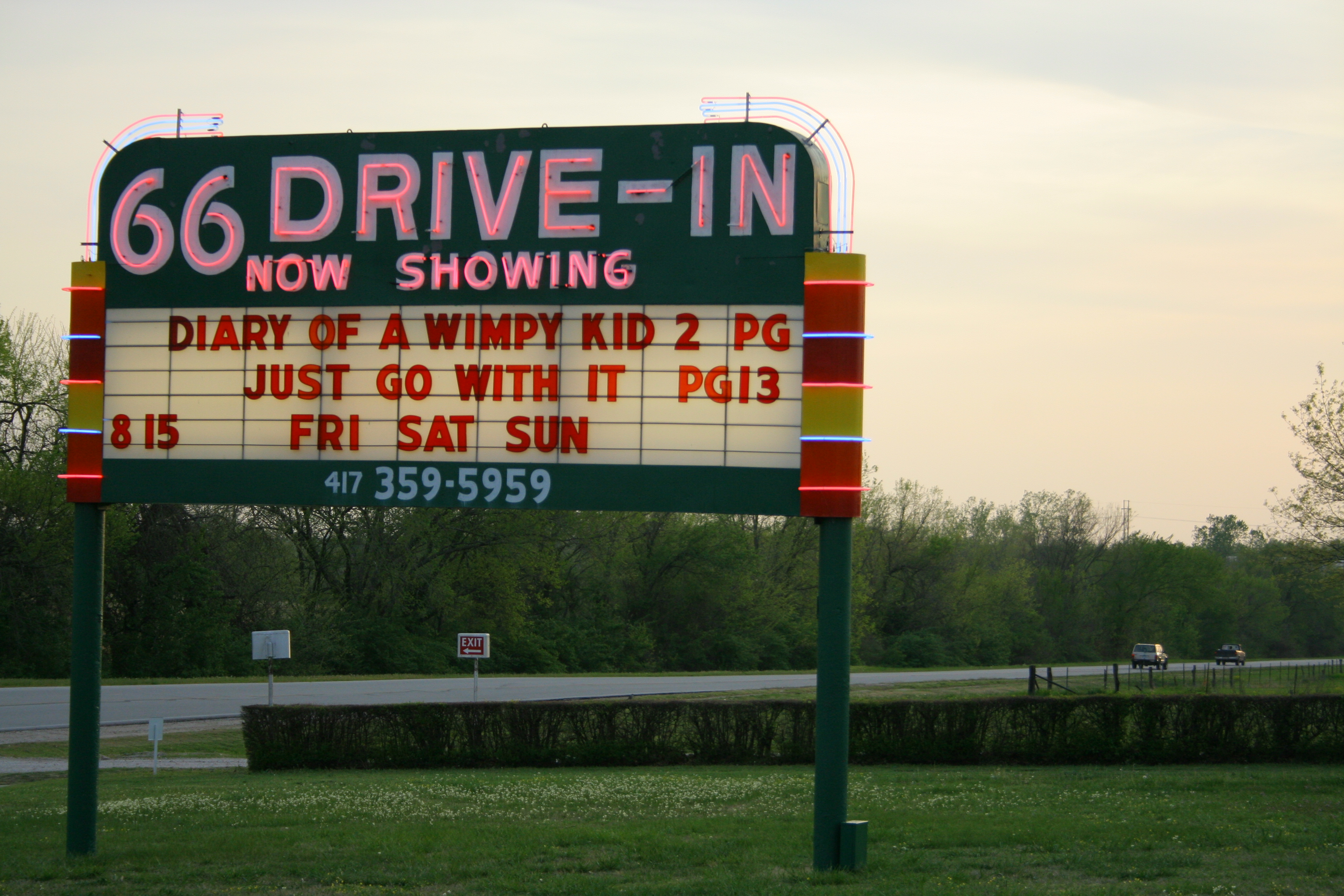
Illuminated neon sign at the 66 Drive-in

When television became a rival to cinema in the 1950s, movie studios went to widescreen format to differentiate their product from broadcast TV; the drive-in's screen was widened sometime after 1953 to accommodate the change in format. A playground was added on-site during the baby boom era.

The cinema was closed in 1985, but was renovated and reopened in 1998. It now shows two movies Friday, Saturday, Sunday every week.

The speakers are now gone, although the poles which once supported them remain.

A drive-in movie venue with many strong similarities to the original 66 Drive-In design (such as the original 4:3 screen aspect ratio, pole-mounted speakers and neon signage on the marquée) appears during the epilogue of Pixar's 2006 film Cars. The fictional drive-in is depicted as screening parody versions of other Pixar feature films.

== See also ==
- List of drive-in theaters
