= Brian Kennedy (hurler) =

Irish hurler

Personal information
- Native name: Briain Ó Cinnéide (Irish)
- Born: 30 January 1992 (age 34) Freshford, County Kilkenny, Ireland
- Height: 5 ft 10 in (178 cm)

Sport
- Sport: Hurling
- Position: Left corner-back
Club
- Years: Club
- St Lachtain's
Inter-county*
Years	County	Apps (scores)
2014-	Kilkenny	2 (0-00)
Inter-county titles
- Leinster titles: 1
- All-Irelands: 1
- NHL: 1
- All Stars: 0
- *Inter County team apps and scores correct as of 18:33, 7 July 2014.

Brian Kennedy (born 30 January 1992) is an Irish hurler who plays as a left corner-back for the Kilkenny senior team.

Born in Freshford, County Kilkenny, Kennedy first played competitive hurling whilst at school at Kilkenny CBS. He arrived on the inter-county scene at the age of seventeen when he first linked up with the Kilkenny minor team before later joining the under-21 side. Kennedy made his senior debut during the 2014 National Hurling League and quickly became a regular member of the team. Since then he has won one National Hurling League medal, one Leinster Senior Hurling Championship and one All-Ireland Senior Hurling Championship medal as a non-playing substitute.

At club level Kennedy is a one-time All-Ireland medallist in the intermediate grade with St Lachtain's. In addition to this he has also won one Leinster medal and one championship medal.

== Honours ==
=== Player ===
St Lachtain's

- AIB All-Ireland Junior Club Hurling Championship (1): 2025 (Vs Russell Rovers-Cork)
- All-Ireland Intermediate Club Hurling Championship (1): 2010
- Leinster Intermediate Club Hurling Championship (1): 2009
- Kilkenny Intermediate Hurling Championship (1): 2009

Kilkenny

- All-Ireland Senior Hurling Championship (1): 2014 (sub)
- Leinster Senior Hurling Championship (1): 2014 (sub)
- National Hurling League (1): 2014
- Leinster Intermediate Hurling Championship (1): 2012
- Leinster Under-21 Hurling Championship (1): 2012
- All-Ireland Minor Hurling Championship (1): 2010
- Leinster Minor Hurling Championship (1): 2010
