= Wellfleet Drive-In Theater =

Theater in Wellfleet, Massachusetts

Coordinates: 41°52′38.88″N 69°59′30.88″W

Wellfleet Drive-In and Cinemas
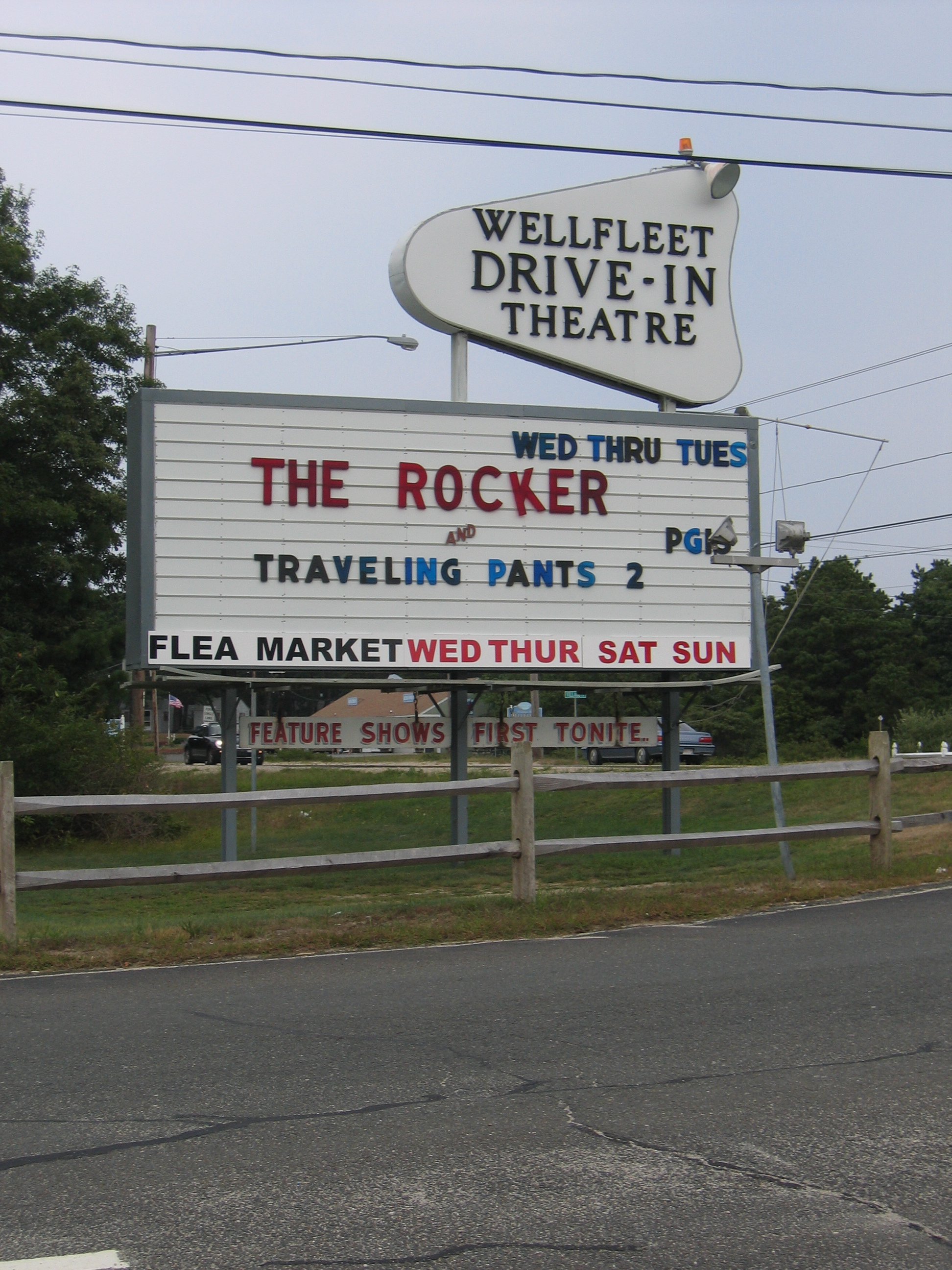
- Main entrance of the theater in 2008
- Interactive map of Wellfleet Drive-In and Cinemas
- Address: 51 State Highway, Route 6 Wellfleet, Massachusetts; United States
- Owner: Spring Brook Center
- Type: Drive-in theater

Construction
- Opened: 1957

The Wellfleet Drive-In Theater is the only drive-in theater on Cape Cod, located in Wellfleet, Massachusetts along U.S. Route 6, near the Massachusetts Audubon Society's Wellfleet Bay Wildlife Sanctuary. The complex offers first-run double features in season, with other attractions such as indoor cinemas, a flea market, a miniature golf course, and restaurants.

The Drive-In is one of the venues for the annual Provincetown International Film Festival in Provincetown, Massachusetts . Frommer's lists the Drive-In as one of the "500 Places to See Before They Disappear" and Travel and Leisure selected it as a Top Ten Retro Escape.

== History ==
Its original owners, John Jentz and Charlie Zehnder, opened the drive-in on July 3, 1957. It has a 100-by-44-foot (30 m × 13 m) screen, with sound provided by both an FM stereo signal and the original individual monaural speakers that can be attached to a car's window. The mini-golf features obstacles that date back to 1961. The cinema was built in the 1980s; according to Eleanor Hazen, its owner at the time, one of the reasons the cinema was built is that film distributors started refusing to allow drive-ins to show first-run feature films.

== See also ==
- List of drive-in theaters
