= Brian Kennedy (businessman) =

British businessman

Brian Kennedy is a British businessman, who has owned and managed businesses in the UK and the United States. They include Everest Home Improvement and Genesis Communications. In 2019, The Sunday Times listed him as the 460th richest person in the United Kingdom.

In sport, he has owned both Stockport County and Sale Sharks. He also made unsuccessful bids for two Scottish football clubs, Rangers F.C. and Hibernian F.C. Brian Kennedy is a devout Jehovas Witness https://www.gerrymccannsblogs.co.uk/Nigel/id147.htm

== Life and career ==
Kennedy grew up in Edinburgh, Scotland and attended Tynecastle High School. In 1999, Kennedy purchased a group of companies that included glazing manufacturer, Everest. Latium Enterprises was formed around this time, which has gone on to serve as parent company to many of his business interests.

In 2004, he sold his founding stake in Genesis Communications to Dixons for £31 million. In 2006, Kennedy agreed to acquire Ultraframe in a £29.2m takeover deal. Kennedy sold his stake in Everest in 2007. In 2010, Patrick Properties which is owned and managed by Kennedy, secured £60 million to be used for expanding the property firm.

In 2013, Kennedy Renewables setup Little Raith wind farm near Fife, Scotland. It became the biggest wind farm in the region at the time. In 2014, Kennedy partly funded and co-produced the film The Homesman. A year later, Kennedy also had a similar financing and production arrangement on the film The Great Gilly Hopkins.

Kennedy's Latium Enterprises reached £810 million in annual turnover in 2019, according to The Sunday Times. During the same year, he featured in the Netflix documentary The Disappearance of Madeleine McCann, after Kennedy helped fund the search for the missing child with donations.

== Sports ==
Kennedy previously owned Sale Sharks and won the European Challenge Cup in both 2002 and 2005 during his tenure. He sold the rugby union team in 2016 to a consortium. He was also the owner of Edgeley Park and football club Stockport County. He also was one of a number of bidders for Scottish side Rangers in 2012.

He also attempted to purchase Hibernian F.C., based in his home city of Edinburgh. However his offer was rejected.
