= Bengies Drive-In Theatre =

Drive-in theater in Middle River, Maryland, US

Bengies Drive-In
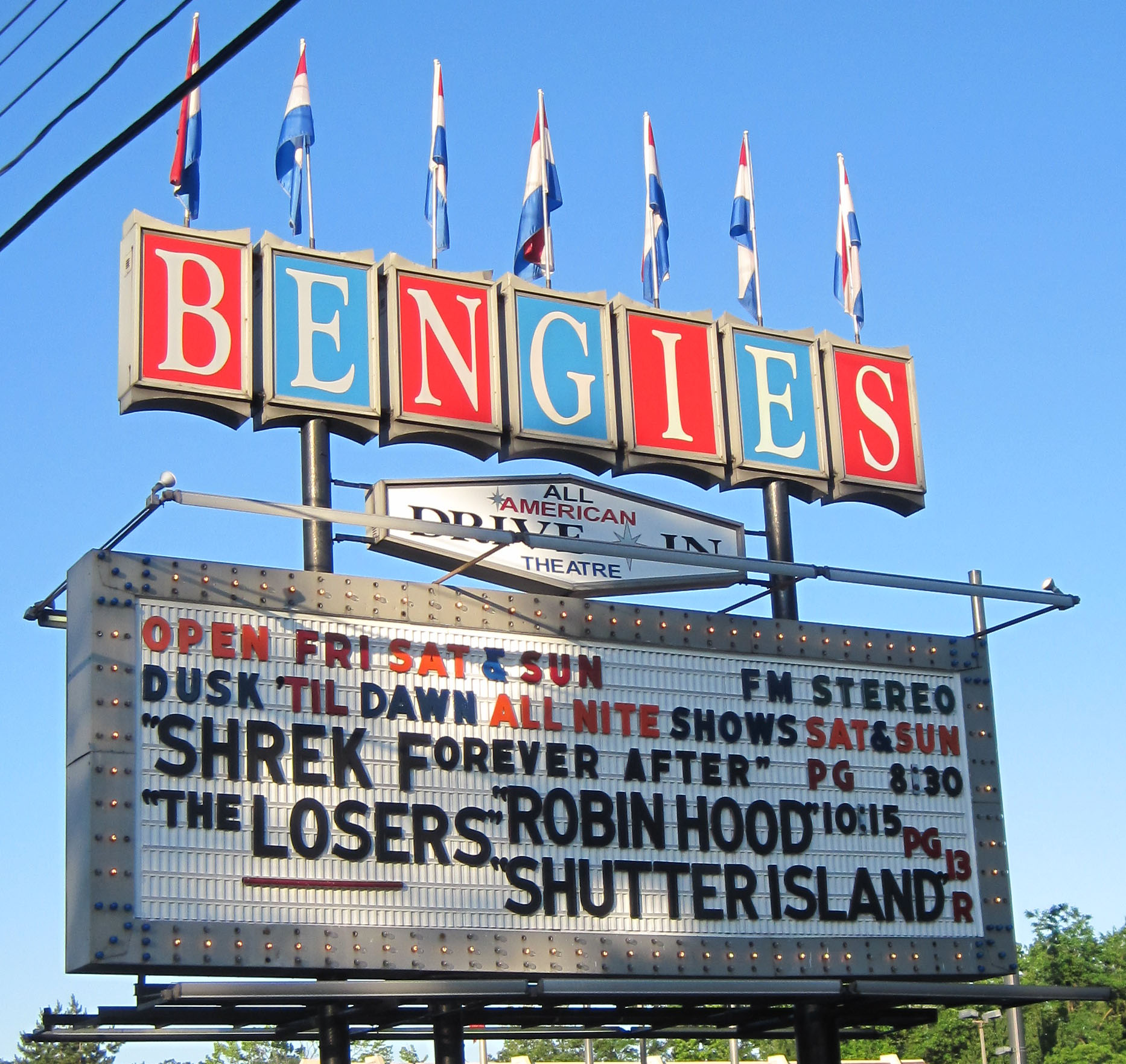
- Bengies Drive-In marquee
- Interactive map of Bengies Drive-In
- Address: 3417 Eastern Boulevard; Middle River, MD 21220; United States
- Coordinates: 39.3360°N 76.4038°W
- Type: Drive-In

Construction
- Opened: June 6, 1956

Website
- bengies.com

Bengies Drive-In is a drive-in theater in Middle River, Maryland, a suburb of Baltimore, with the largest movie screen remaining in the United States.

== History ==
Bengies was opened on June 6, 1956 by Frog Mortar Corporation. It was designed by Jack K. Vogel as one of three drive-ins in the Vogel Theatre chain, and is still owned by the Vogel family, and as of 2009 showed entirely double features, with triple features on weekends as of 2014.

During the 2020 COVID-19 pandemic, it was one of many drive-ins in the US used for socially distanced movie viewing and other events, and kept open after the summer ended; the theater rented in-car heaters to patrons.

== Screen ==
Its screen is the largest remaining in the United States, measuring 52 feet (16 m) high and 120 feet (37 m) wide.
