= 88 Drive-In =

Drive-in theater in Commerce City, Colorado, US

- East 88th Avenue Drive-In
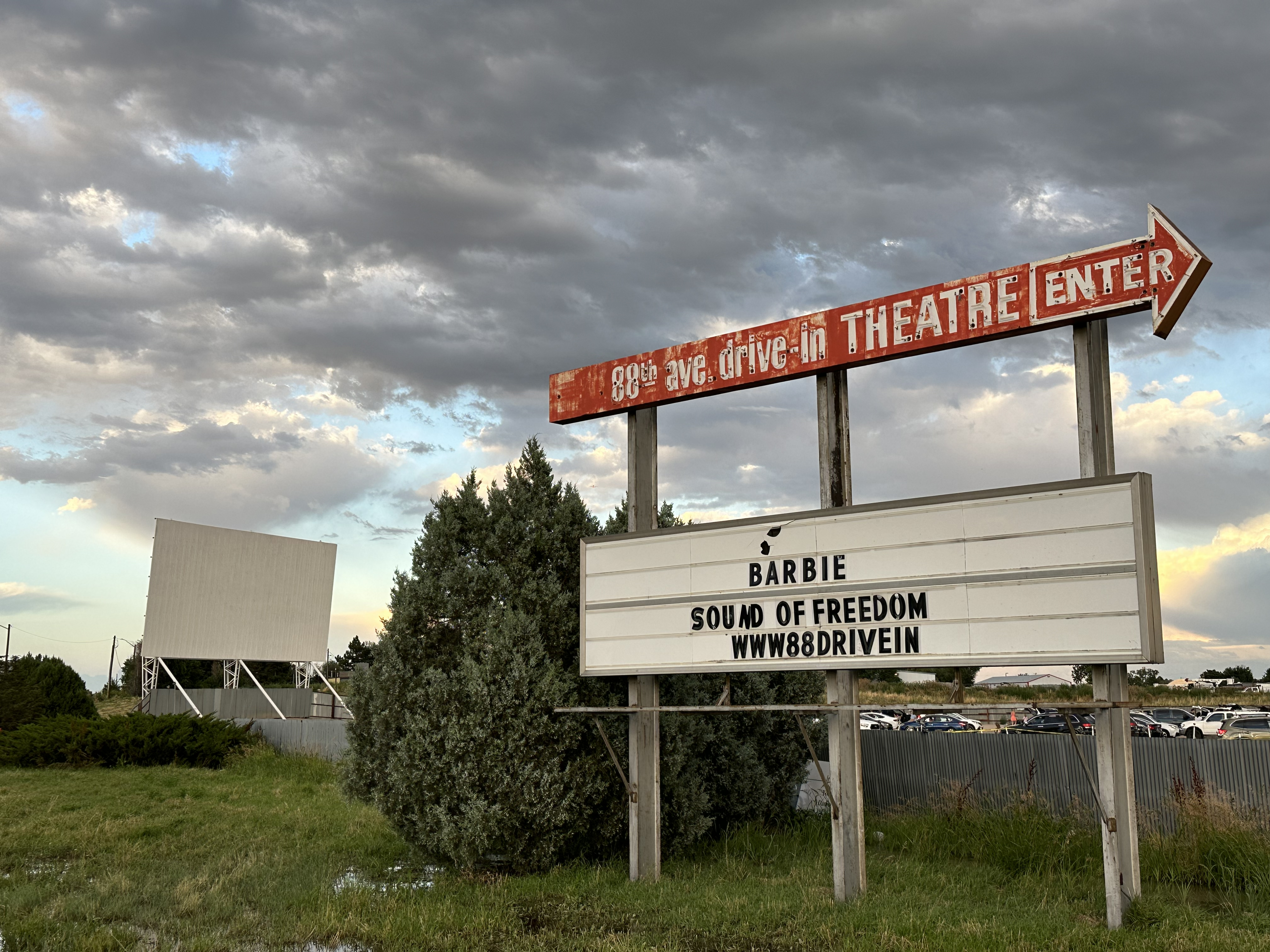
- 88 Drive-In photo
- Interactive map of 88 Drive-In
- Address: 8780 Rosemary St, Commerce City, CO 80022; Commerce City, CO 80022; United States
- Coordinates: 39.855°N 104.898°W
- Owner: Susan Kochevar
- Capacity: 500 cars
- Type: Drive-In

Construction
- Opened: August 12, 1971
- Years active: 1971-Current
- Architect: Paul Cory

Website
- www.88drivein.net

88 Drive-In (formerly East 88th Avenue Drive-In) is a drive-in theater in the Irondale neighborhood of Commerce City, a suburb of Denver.

== History ==
=== 1970s ===
Following a successful neighborhood petition for a zoning variance, East 88th Avenue Drive-in opened in August 1971. It was one of three theaters established by Paul Cory, who had also operated the Starlite Drive-In in Sterling, Colorado. The 1971 season was reportedly unprofitable, and in 1972 the drive-in began showing X-rated movies. The neighborhood, that was initially enthusiastic about the new drive-in, was disappointed with this turn of events. Drivers passing by were said to be distracted the by the X-rated films. A fence was erected around the roof of a nearby school to prevent students from climbing to the top of the building at night to watch the X-rated films. To address these issues, the drive-in first tried to build a fence measuring 30 feet (9.1 m) high around the perimeter of the property, but were denied by local authorities. A similar effort to hang a large light screen around the property draped from tall poles was also rejected by the county. In November 1972, Cory explained to court authorities that he had sold the drive-in to Olympic Drive-In Theatres of St. Louis.

Under new management, on February 11 of the following year, a bomb was detonated at the drive-in's concession stand. The blast opened a 12-inch hole in the wall and created $1500 worth of damages (equivalent to $10,879 in 2025). Earlier in the day prior to the explosion, the new manager, Michael Middleton, had been assaulted in a local grocery store. The suspect was apprehended, booked and then released on bail. In early March 1973, an injunction was issued directing the drive-in to shut down, but was addressed incorrectly to 8700 Rosemary, and hence the drive-in remained open. Neighbors, however, attempted to create a blockade around the drive-in using their cars. Later that March a correctly addressed injunction was delivered to the drive-in, shutting it down until yet unmet conditions of the original zoning variance were met. These conditions, however, only ordered the drive-in to install curbs and sidewalks. The drive-in reopened in May after reaching a settlement. The driven-in stopped showing X-rated films and the projectionist, Paul Rabe, became the new manager.

The drive-in changed ownership two more times, first to EMW Management of Houston that would later sell it to Steve Eisner of Scottsdale, Arizona in April 1974. In January 1976 a classified ad for the drive-in was placed in Boxoffice, and it was later sold to the family that continues to own it as of June 2023. The buyer was Bill Holshue, who was also the manager of Lake Shore Drive-In in Lakewood. At this time it was renamed 88 Drive-In. Bill and Margaret Holshue would later pass ownership of the 88 Drive-In to their daughter, Susan Kochevar.

=== 2010s and 2020s ===
In a 2010 article, Kochevar explained that the drive-in was still was buying movies on film to show on their existing film projector, however the industry technology was shifting towards digital projectors. She estimated a suitable digital projector would cost $80,000 (equivalent to $118,114 in 2025). By 2014 it became clear that she would need to purchase a digital projector to continue operating the drive-in.

That same year, Kochevar was contacted multiple times by local law enforcement and other Commerce City authorities regarding the amount of traffic generated by cars entering and exiting her theater. In July 2014, a letter was issued threatening to suspend or revoke her business license. The roads adjacent to the drive-in, 88th Avenue and Rosemary Street, represent two of the major thoroughfares in the Irondale neighborhood, making congestion there especially problematic for people driving through the area. Commerce City authorities argued that the traffic congestion created a problem for emergency response vehicles, and that the theater's management didn't sufficiently monitor customer's consumption of alcohol and marijuana while they were in their cars.

Kochevar responded that Commerce City was trying to hold her responsible for changing people's driving habits rather than improving roads, noting that in the prior 40 years of operation this had never been raised as an issue before. Kochevar would later bring a petition to Commerce City officials showing more than 12,000 signatures of people supporting her in keeping the drive-in operational.

2014 would also see Kochevar, who lived in Westminster, Colorado, at the time, become the Republican nominee for state House District 29, in Jefferson County. She ran unsuccessfully against Democratic incumbent Tracy Kraft-Tharp in 2014 and then unsuccessfully again in 2016. In 2018 she had moved closer to the drive-in and ran for state House District 30 and lost to incumbent Dafna Michaelson Jenet.

88 Drive-In would open for the new season in April 2015 with a new digital projector and a 40 feet (12 m) high by 70 feet (21 m) wide screen, and no further threats of disruption from Commerce City.

During the COVID-19 pandemic, Colorado experienced renewed interest and attendance at drive-ins as, among other features, they had room to accommodate social distancing. 88 Drive-In remained open through most of their normal 2020 and 2021 seasons, with reduced capacity of 250 cars per night.

=== Potential closure ===
At the May 18th, 2023 meeting of the Commerce City Planning Commission, it was announced that Susan Kochevar "...is ready to leave the movie theater business." At the meeting, developers proposed replacing the drive-in with a large warehouse. For the warehouse construction to proceed, its zoning Planned Unit Development (PUD) will need to be changed. As zoned in 1971, the PUD only allowed for a drive-in theater and a single-family residence. The zoning will need to be changed from that PUD to an I-1: Light-Intensity Industrial District, which is a general commercial and industrial area zoning. Should a zoning variance be allowed, Chicago-based developer First Industrial Realty Trust, will build a warehouse on the land that is now used for the 88 Drive-In. This was discussed again at the June 5th meeting of Commerce City city council.

Before the evening of the June 5, 2023, city council meeting, Westword printed a statement Kochevar and her associates had given directly to the magazine. The statement explained that it was a difficult decision for them to sell the drive-in, and that the property had already been under contract for 18 months. They added that they felt the best use for the land would be to be redeveloped as a warehouse. Due to the growth of the city around the drive-in property, she explained, it is no longer an ideal location due to light and noise pollution.

However in March 26, 2024, the 88th Drive-in Instagram announced they will open for the 2024 season, countering 2023 report's. On March 28th Commerce City spokesperson Travis Huntington state the reason was that the company, First Industrial Realty Trust, withdrew the application before the city could hold a final vote on the rezoning. As of now, there are no other applications to buy the property. Then on May 10th, the 88th Drive-in officially reopened for the 2024 season. It was announced on April 2, 2026, that the 88 Drive-In would once again reopen for their 50th season. Tickets cost $10 per person for two movie showings, and children under 12 are free.
