= Mobmov =

Mobile Movie (aka "MobMov") is a worldwide network of guerrilla drive-ins using car-powered video projectors and FM transmitters. The MobMov represents over 150 independent guerrilla drive-ins, from United States to France, India, and Australia.

Shows are free and are announced via mailing list and SMS. Patrons drive to the listed location, tune their radios, and watch a movie drive-in style. The coordinator uses a car or small generator to power the projector and FM transmitter.

The MobMov was started by Bryan Kennedy in May, 2005. Kennedy's San Francisco-area MobMov has been defunct since late 2009 but other variations on the concept exist in the San Francisco Bay Area, and throughout the United States.

== See also ==
- List of drive-in theaters
- Drive-in theater Revival, for other guerrilla drive in operations
