= Beverly Drive-In Theatre =

- U.S. National Register of Historic Places
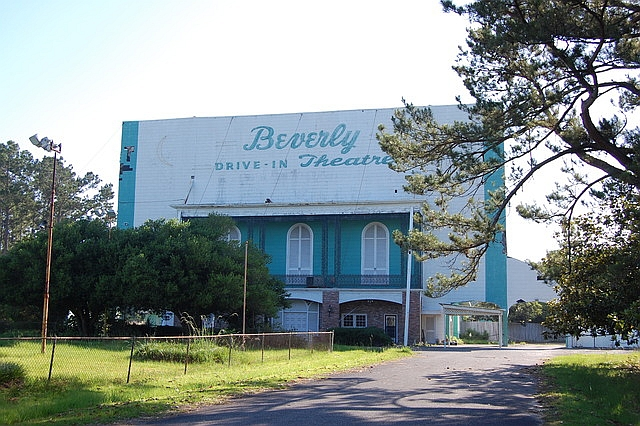
- Beverly Drive-In Theatre 2008

- Location within Mississippi Location within the United States
- Location: 5320 US Hwy 49 S., Hattiesburg, Mississippi
- Coordinates: 31°16′42.38″N 89°17′15.79″W
- Area: 12 acres (49,000 m^{2})
- NRHP reference No.: 08000761
- Added to NRHP: July 30, 2008

Beverly Drive-In Theatre opened May 29, 1948, as a cinema structure in Forrest County, Mississippi. It was operated continuously by the original owners until 1987, then reopened in 2001 under new management. Following substantial damage to the infrastructure by Hurricane Katrina in 2005, the Beverly Drive-In never recovered. In 2008, the drive-in was listed on the National Register of Historic Places. In 2010, a fire of unknown origin destroyed the facility.

== History ==
The Beverly Drive-In was constructed in 1948 under ownership of the Hargroder family. The main screen measured 105 by 75 feet (32 by 23 meters), and the theatre contained a paved parking area for 500 vehicles. The back of the screen tower held a display of neon lights that denoted the Beverly logo with a moon and shooting stars. The original owners built their home beneath the main screen. A second screen, measuring 80 by 40 feet (24 by 12 meters), was added in March 1979.

The theatre was named Beverly after one of the daughters of the original owner. The theatre operated continuously from 1948 until 1987, when it closed following the original owner's death in 1980, but it was used periodically thereafter for special events. The theatre reopened on May 15, 2001 under new management led by Jim Norton and Barbara Suick who operated other drive-in theatres in several states. By 2005, the Beverly was the oldest drive-in theatre still operating in Mississippi. In August 2005, Hurricane Katrina caused significant damage to the screen and buildings, but few repairs were made following the storm's aftermath; consequently, the drive-in never reopened.

In 2007, the Mississippi Heritage Trust listed the Beverly Drive-In as one of the ten most endangered historic places in Mississippi. The theatre was added to the National Register of Historic Places on July 30, 2008.

On October 30, 2010, a fire of unknown origin resulted in complete destruction of the Beverly Drive-In.

== See also ==
- List of drive-in theaters
