= Midway Drive-In (Texas) =

Coordinates: 34.37456°N 100.97539°W

The Midway Drive-In Theater was built in 1955 between Turkey and Quitaque, Texas, on Highway 86 when over 300 drive-ins were operating in Texas.

== Background ==
This theatre was like the other Midway drive-ins that were built midway between two towns or cities. It closed down in the 1980s during a time that few drive-ins were surviving across America. Then, it was purchased, restored, and reopened to play current movies by a local citizen in 2000. The Midway was noted in episode 818 of Texas Country Reporter that aired May 3, 2003. The drive-in ran for over five years until it closed again. The property was rented, and opened intermittently until 2009, when it was purchased by another family, who started a second restoration and reopened the theater. It has been listed as one of 545 known permanently constructed and commercially operated drive-ins in the world that still operated in 2011. Other Midway Drive-Ins are located around the US, but this theater is the only known one still in operation in Texas until 2011. The Midway Drive-In closed down and did not open in 2012 because of the lack of available 35-mm film prints. Supply slowed down because of the Hollywood transition to digital distribution only.

== See also ==
- List of drive-in theaters
