= Spud Drive-In Theater =

- U.S. National Register of Historic Places
- U.S. Historic district
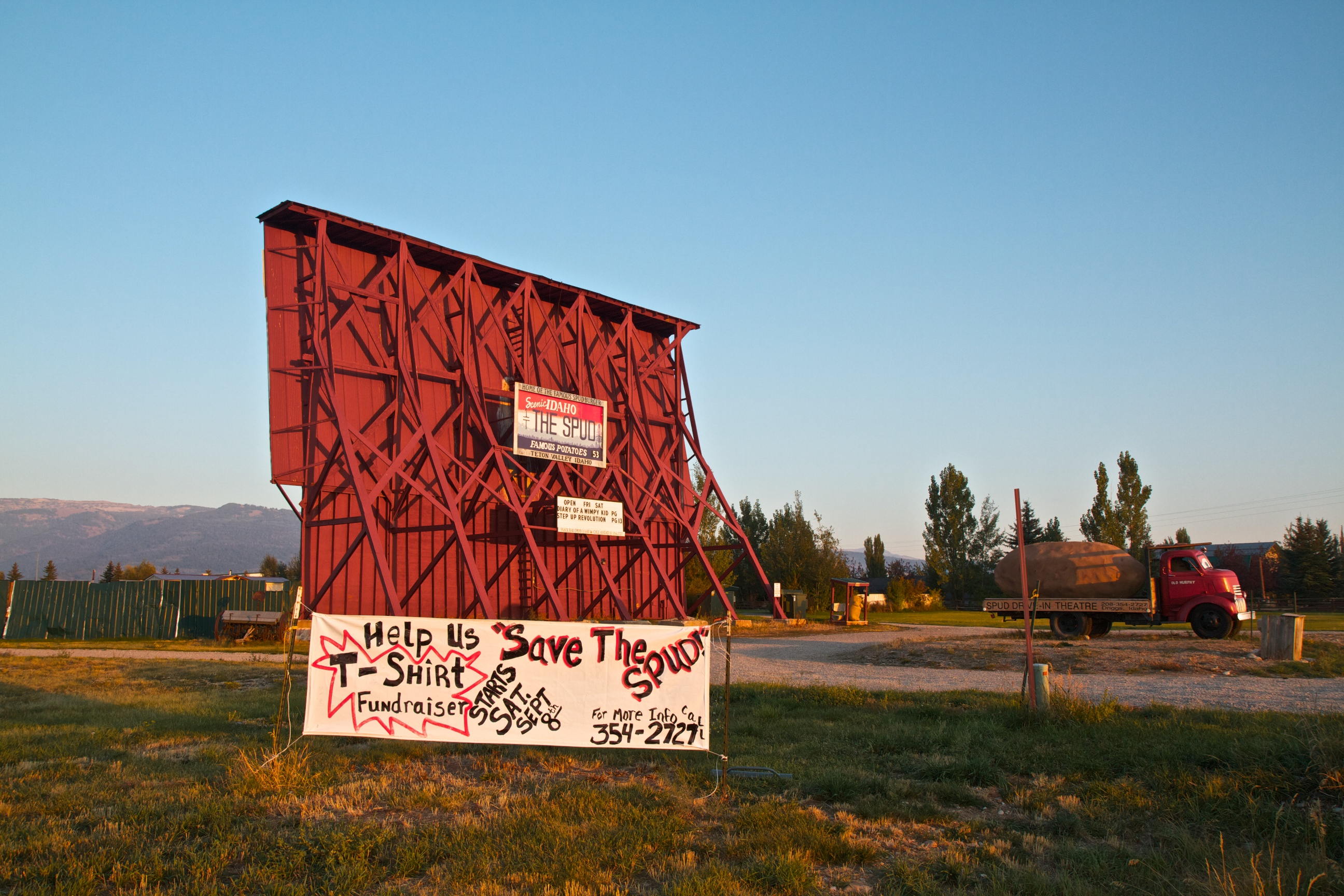
- The theater's sign alongside the giant potato

- Location within Idaho Location within the United States
- Nearest city: Driggs, Idaho
- Coordinates: 43°41′22″N 111°6′30″W
- Area: 4.2 acres (1.7 ha)
- Built: 1953
- Architect: Fence Company of Michigan; Ballentyne Company
- NRHP reference No.: 99001475
- Added to NRHP: June 05, 2003

The Spud Drive-In Theater is a drive-in theater between Victor and Driggs, Idaho.

== Background ==
Located in a potato-farming region, the theater's entrance sign features a giant potato on the back of a 1946 Chevrolet flat-bed truck. The drive-in was built by Ace Wood in 1953. The theatre has also hosted concerts, including a 2010 concert by the band Widespread Panic. Financial difficulties in 2011 threatened to close the drive-in, but arrangements were made to continue its operation.

On the evening of April 4, 2022, the original screen structure was destroyed in a windstorm. Manager Katie Mumm said that it would be rebuilt in the same colors as the original structure and that they will probably need to replace the screen.

In August 2023, MD Nursery purchased the Spud. MD Nursery owns the surrounding land and operates a commercial landscaping company. The new owners plan to keep the theater in operation.

== SpudFest Family Film and Music Festival 2004-2008 ==
Spud Drive-In Theater was the home base for the film screenings, music performances and parties of The SpudFest Family Film and Music Festival, which was an annual film festival from 2004 to 2008. It was established in the summer of 2004 by Dawn Wells, the original Mary Ann from Gilligan's Island and founded as a natural outgrowth of the Idaho Film and Television Institute and Film Actors Boot Camp.

SpudFest was discontinued in 2008.

== See also ==
- List of drive-in theaters
