= Auto-Vue Drive-In Theatre =

Drive-in theater in Colville, Washington, US

Auto-Vue Drive-In
- Interactive map of Auto-Vue Drive-In
- Address: 444 Auto View Road, Colville, WA 99115; Colville, Washington; United States
- Coordinates: 48.585°N 117.975°W
- Elevation: 1,555 ft (474 m)
- Capacity: Approx. 220 vehicles
- Type: Drive-in
- Event: Theater
- Screen: One
- Acreage: 4.5

Construction
- Opened: 1953
- Years active: 1953–present

The Auto-Vue Drive-In is a single screen drive-in theatre located in northwestern Stevens County, Washington, United States. Located between Kettle Falls and Colville, the approximately 220-car venue is located adjacent to U.S. Route 395 near the base of Rattlesnake Mountain. It first opened in June 1953 and has operated seasonally since, closing yearly before winter and opening again the next spring. In the late 2000s, the Auto-Vue faced probable closure due to the cost of transitioning from 35mm film to a digital projection system. Purchase of an intact drive-in theater screen from a defunct operation and replacement of the camera system allowed the theater to continue operation. The theater and its sister have been sold several times since opening, in the 1957, 1974, and most recently in 2024.

== Location ==
The theater is located at about 1,555 ft (474 m) in elevation in the Colville River valley adjacent to U.S. Route 395, 4 mi (6.4 km) west of Colville. Located in north Stevens County, it is approximately 75 mi (121 km) northwest of Spokane, and approximately a six-hour drive from the Seattle urban area. Viewing movies places the bulk of Rattlesnake Mountain, across Route 395, behind the screen as a backdrop.

== Amenities ==
The estimated 2024 capacity was around 235 vehicles, with attendance being an average of 500 people, though it's possible with very full ridership viewings to bring attendance up to 1000 people. On nights where the parking fills up, patrons may be turned away or told to park at a nearby gravel quarry and walk in to join acquaintances already onsite. The theater is pet friendly, only asking that the pets remain on leash and are cleaned up afterwards.

A single building on the property houses the concessions area, the projections room, restrooms, and a small apartment where a manager can live. With the change in ownership in 2024, the restrooms were remodeled and upgraded. The property lacks a dedicated children's play area, and the area around the building is unpaved. As concessions are an important part of the theater revenue, outside food and drink is not permitted into the grounds. Additionally the venue is a dry theater, not permitting alcohol onsite.

From opening until the 2014-15 digital conversion, the theater used a 35mm film drive-in theater projection system. It was replaced by a NEC NC2000C digital projector that has been mounted on the original 35mm projector stand. The replacement screen is 30 ft (9.1 m) tall and has a 70 ft (21 m) horizontal span, while the original was a square frame screen which would sometimes not be big enough for the movies presented leaving the movie credits to run off the screen edges. Sound is provided over FM radio channel and not the usual stand mounted drive-in speaker system. During a wind event in 1983 the highway marquee blew down. It was not rebuilt and erected again until 1990.

== History and sister theaters ==
The Auto-Vue first opened in June 1953 as the sister theater to the Alpine Theater located in Coville proper, which opened on January 8, 1937, and The Avalon Theatre of Chewelah, Washington. The theater had an open house event on Sunday May 10, and officially opened the evening of Monday May 11. Initial plans were also announced in February 1953 for a drive-in to be built just south of Chewelah to be named The Chief. With a planned capacity of 400 cars it would have been 100 car stalls larger than the Auto-Vue. The group was sold in November 1957 to new owners in Republic, Washington, who also owned the Selma Theater there.

At the height of the drive-in heyday in the late 1950s it is estimated that over 4,000 theaters were in operation, with seven in Spokane plus two in Coeur d'Alene, Idaho operating into the 1980s. However, by 1994 the last of the drive-ins in Spokane had closed, as had those in north Idaho, leaving the Auto-Vue as the last operating drive-in within a 70 mi (110 km) radius of Spokane. In 2013 the Auto-Vue had become the last drive-in theater operating in all of Eastern Washington and Northern Idaho. All the other theaters had succumbed to declining viewership brought on in the 1980s and the advent of video rental shops, and as of 2024 operating drive-in numbers in the United States had dwindled to around 200 to 250 nationally, with only five in Washington.

Pricing has increased gradually over the years with adult admission in 1996 moving from $2.50 a head to $4, kids getting in free, and no showing if less than five vehicles attending. Eight years later the cost had inched up to $5 for adults, $1 for children under 11, and Sundays were "carload night" with a flat $10 fee per vehicle. The 2024 admissions were up to $8 for adults and $4 for children under 11, but Sundays were still the same carload night price.

As the only drive-in theater in the inland northwest, 2024 patronage included visitors from British Columbia and Alberta, Idaho, Montana, and Oregon. The Auto-Vue and its sister theater the Alpine were the only theaters operating in Stevens County in 2024.

== Scheduling history and pandemic impact ==
The summer of 2003 marked the 50th anniversary for the Auto-Vue, and over the season special offers on viewings and concessions were given. In 2004 the theater was running from Memorial day to Labor Day, six nights a week and Sundays were "carload" nights. The 2024 viewing schedule maintains the tradition of first run movies shown as double features May through October, though showings were only Friday through Sunday. There are also occasional screenings of special events over the season. The movie start time varies with the time of year, aligning with nightfall on any given day. The theater is also available for special occasion rental.

In 2020 the COVID-19 pandemic brought about state restrictions on most businesses. These restrictions delayed the opening of the Auto-Vue beyond the traditional May 1 date, and prevented the Alpine from opening in the first half of the year. The concessions booth was initially going to be kept closed as well. The closures presented financial problems for both theaters despite the Auto-Vue being "in the black". Following the early shut down of non-essential business, Washington states "Safe Start Washington - Phase 2" pandemic plan included the opening of drive-in theaters, with the stipulation that movie goers were to stay in their vehicles or in lawn chairs between the vehicle and screen. Masking was required for visiting the concession stand or restroom.

The Auto-Vue was officially open by June 2020. As of June 27 it was one of three drive-in and pop-up drive-ins in eastern Washington and Northern Idaho that showed the Garth Brooks: A Drive-In Concert Experience. The $100 ticket price was stipulated to cover one sedan or SUV and only up to six people. The event was shown at 300 total venues across the United States, and despite Ticketmaster's website crashing, tickets to the Auto-Vue showing were sold out by the Wednesday before the concert.

== Digital conversion ==
In 2012 the theater owner Steve Wisner announced that 2013 would likely be the last season for the Auto-Vue. Up until the late 2000s both it and the Alpine Theater were able to get first run movies in 35mm film format to run on the aging projection equipment without issue. However changing industry practice would soon involve digital only distribution of first run movies. As such the Alpine was retrofitted with new digital equipment to keep up with the need, but this drained the finances.

It was estimated that a conversion of the Auto-Vues projection equipment would cost at least $82,000 (equivalent to about $113,300 in 2025) with retrofitting costs for the projection booth an additional $2,000 (equivalent to about $2,800 in 2025) expense. Another major looming cost for the theater was the need to replace the screen itself, which was still the original structure from the opening and as of 2013 approaching 60 years old. The screens frame had been constructed from cedar timbers and the weather wear was starting to show. Building a new screen was given an initial $94,000 (equivalent to about $129,900 in 2025) price tag. After closing, Wisner planned to convert the 4.5 acres (1.8 ha) into a hops farm supplying the local microbrewery industry.

After the announcement of the possible closure at the end of 2013, the theaters 60th, community response asking what could be done to keep the theater open grew. An online group named "Save the Auto-Vue drive-in" was formed. The group organized a series of fundraising concerts and auctions plus set up an account with the Colville Key Bank location for direct donation deposits. By spring of 2014, the fund had reached $11,000 towards the combined digitization and screen replacements estimated $186,000 (equivalent to about $253,000 in 2025) cost via fundraisers and social media work, such as a GoFundMe campaign.

Given the community investment in keeping the theater, Wisner began investigating options to facilitate the conversion. The digital projector was the more problematic need. In late fall 2013 the community group entered into a Honda sponsored national give away contest for drive-ins. Based on online voting in the contest, five digital projectors would be awarded to the five winning struggling drive-ins. However the Auto-Vue was not one of the winning theaters, and a digital projection system was still needed. Among the options looked at as temporary solutions was a smaller projector that if set up at the front of the parking area, could have projected DVDs on the screen. The smaller projector was purchased, but was installed in the Alpine theater instead, and the digital projector that had been bought several years earlier for the Alpine was transferred to the Auto-Vue.

The need to replace the screen was solved when the screen for the closed drive-in near Soap Lake, Washington was suggested. The Park-In Drive-In was opened in June 1953 with a similar capacity as the Auto-Vue, and the screen was still in good condition. After connecting with a semi-trailer truck willing to transport the screen for free, and with the help of several welders he knew, the screen was transported for free to its new home in late spring of 2014. The screen was sold to the Auto-Vue for a scrap metal fee of $4,000, while the old Auto-Vue cedar screen had been demolished in May 2014.

The theater remained closed for several seasons while the conversion was completed and the replacement screen was transported north and installed. The theater was fully closed for the 2014 season, but were initially hopeful in May 2015 that a nearly full 2015 season would be possible, with a possible opening date in June. The theater finally officially reopened for the 2016 season as a digital drive in venue.

== Ownership ==
The theater was opened and first operated by Colville resident Max Hadfield. In November 1957, Kan Haines, owner and manager of the Alpine, Avalon and Auto-Vue theaters sold the group to Mr and Mrs Pipkin of Republic. He stayed on though February 1958 before fully resigning from managing the group in prep to move to Tacoma.

Earl and Jane Wisner bought and took over managing the theaters in 1974 when they moved to Colville, with Steve Wisner, manager in 2013 working for his father until 1993 when he took over ownership with his wife Karen.

In late 2023 Wisner put the theater and the Alpine up for sale, soon turning 72 and having decided he wanted to retire. He listed the pair as a package deal with a sale price of $800,000, which included everything from the buildings to the real-estate. On June 17, 2024, purchase of the theaters was finalized to Andrew Ross, a Colville local, and his fiancé Scott Aslakson. Ross grew up in Colville and visited the theater as a child, after graduation he moved to the greater Seattle area for work in the tech industries. It was in Redmond, Washington that he met Aslakson, born in Puyallup and having a wide range of retail and retail management experience. The couple had bought real-estate in Colville with the intention of moving back when they learned the theater was up for sale. Ross and Aslakson were originally going to shadow Wisner and his wife Karen for two weeks to gain on the job training, but the shadowing turned into 2 months as Ross arrived every day to learn more.
