= Midway Drive-In (Ohio) =

Auto drive-in movie theatre

Coordinates: 41.156975°N 81.295035°W

The Midway Drive-In Theater near Ravenna, Ohio, United States is one of two drive-ins operated by John Knepp. Originally built in 1955 by famed drive-in architect Jack K. Vogel, the drive-in was one of the last drive-ins standing with a Vogel screentower. It is named for being located in western Ravenna Township "midway" between the cities of Ravenna to the east and Kent to the west along Ohio State Route 59.

The theater was designed, built, and operated by the Vogel family. A second screentower was added at the back of the lot to make it a twin drive-in. It was sold to Knepp in the early 1990s. From the beginning, the theater featured a rounded blue screentower. The original drawing of the screentower was one of several Vogel designs featured in The American Drive-In Movie Theater book by Don and Susan Sanders (see References section). Of the designs featured in the book, the Midway in Ravenna was the only standing example.

The original screentower was destroyed by a winter storm in December 2000. The screentower was demolished and replaced with a standard-issue Selby Screentower in time for the 2001 season. A display case in the concession stand includes memorabilia including photos of the original screentower.

== See also ==
- List of drive-in theaters
