= Middle River, Maryland =

- Census-designated place
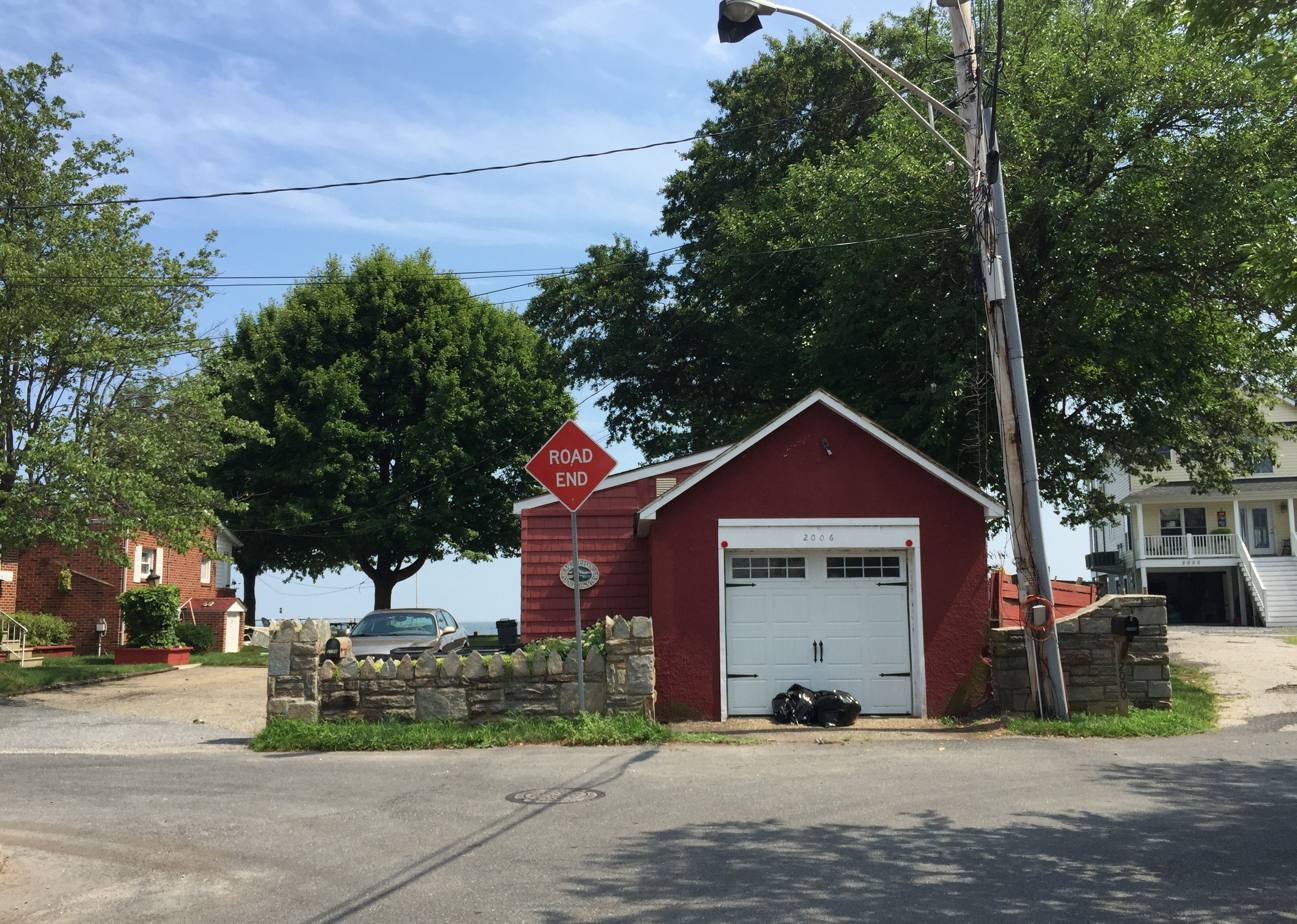
- End of Wilson Point Road in Middle River, Maryland

- Location of Middle River, Maryland
- Coordinates: 39°20′2″N 76°26′26″W
- Country: United States
- State: Maryland
- County: Baltimore

Area
  - Total: 13.64 sq mi (35.34 km^{2})
  - Land: 12.76 sq mi (33.04 km^{2})
  - Water: 0.89 sq mi (2.30 km^{2})
- Elevation: 26 ft (8 m)

Population (2020)
  - Total: 33,203
  - Density: 2,602.6/sq mi (1,004.86/km^{2})
- Time zone: UTC−5 (Eastern (EST))
  - Summer (DST): UTC−4 (EDT)
- ZIP code: 21220
- Area codes: 410 and 443
- FIPS code: 24-52300
- GNIS feature ID: 0590793

Middle River is an unincorporated community and census-designated place in Baltimore County, Maryland, United States. The population was 33,203 at the 2020 census. A Middle River Train Station first appeared on the 1877 G.M. Hopkins & Co Baltimore County Map and by 1898 had a designated Post Office and modest street grid. The town expanded during the 1930s and 1940s and established the "Aero Acres" housing community which borders the railroad tracks and Martin Blvd. to serve as housing for people working at the Martin Aerospace Company. For this development, the architecture firm of Skidmore, Owings & Merrill designed gable-roofed Cape Cod houses with dimensions of 24 feet (7.3 m) by 28 feet (8.5 m), featuring large commercial-style windows in their principal rooms. In 1941 a total of 600 homes were built at Aero Acres using this design from Cemento (a cement/asbestos material).[2]

== Geography ==
Middle River is located at 39°20′2″N 76°26′26″W (39.333957, −76.440502).

According to the United States Census Bureau, the Census Designated Place (CDP) has a total area of 8.5 square miles (22 km^{2}), of which 7.7 square miles (20 km^{2}) is land and 0.7 square miles (1.8 km^{2}), or 8.63%, is water.

== Demographics ==
Historical population
Census	Pop.	Note	%±
1960	10,825		—
1970	19,935		84.2%
1980	26,756		34.2%
1990	24,616		−8.0%
2000	23,958		−2.7%
2010	25,191		5.1%
2020	33,203		31.8%
U.S. Decennial Census

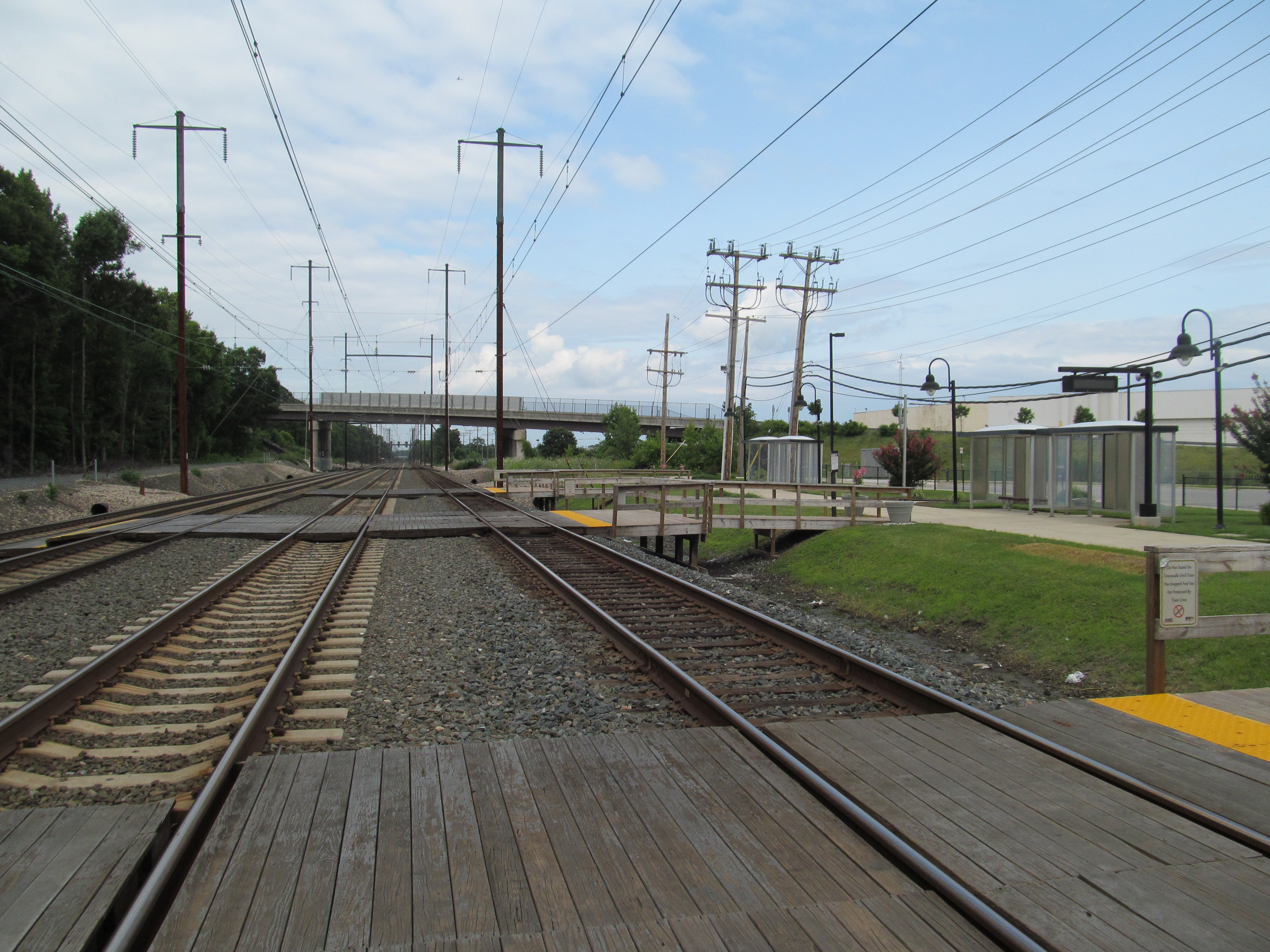
Martin State Airport station has MARC Train commuter rail service to Baltimore and Washington DC

=== Racial and ethnic composition ===
Middle River CDP, Maryland – Racial and ethnic composition Note: the US Census treats Hispanic/Latino as an ethnic category. This table excludes Latinos from the racial categories and assigns them to a separate category. Hispanics/Latinos may be of any race.
Race / Ethnicity (NH = Non-Hispanic)	Pop 2000	Pop 2010	Pop 2020	% 2000	% 2010	% 2020
White alone (NH)	19,585	16,356	16,202	81.75%	64.93%	48.80%
Black or African American alone (NH)	3,139	5,557	10,704	13.10%	22.06%	32.24%
Native American or Alaska Native alone (NH)	131	137	109	0.55%	0.54%	0.33%
Asian alone (NH)	292	832	1,451	1.22%	3.30%	4.37%
Native Hawaiian or Pacific Islander alone (NH)	7	9	6	0.03%	0.04%	0.02%
Other race alone (NH)	35	26	145	0.15%	0.10%	0.44%
Mixed race or Multiracial (NH)	308	702	1,730	1.29%	2.79%	5.21%
Hispanic or Latino (any race)	461	1,572	2,856	1.92%	6.24%	8.60%
Total	23,958	25,191	33,203	100.00%	100.00%	100.00%

=== 2020 census ===
As of the 2020 census, Middle River had a population of 33,203. The median age was 36.4 years. 24.3% of residents were under the age of 18 and 14.0% of residents were 65 years of age or older. For every 100 females there were 91.9 males, and for every 100 females age 18 and over there were 87.4 males age 18 and over.

100.0% of residents lived in urban areas, while 0.0% lived in rural areas.

There were 12,644 households in Middle River, of which 33.3% had children under the age of 18 living in them. Of all households, 39.3% were married-couple households, 18.8% were households with a male householder and no spouse or partner present, and 32.8% were households with a female householder and no spouse or partner present. About 27.5% of all households were made up of individuals and 10.8% had someone living alone who was 65 years of age or older.

There were 13,496 housing units, of which 6.3% were vacant. The homeowner vacancy rate was 1.9% and the rental vacancy rate was 7.2%.

Racial composition as of the 2020 census
Race	Number	Percent
White	16,592	50.0%
Black or African American	10,836	32.6%
American Indian and Alaska Native	165	0.5%
Asian	1,459	4.4%
Native Hawaiian and Other Pacific Islander	7	0.0%
Some other race	1,656	5.0%
Two or more races	2,488	7.5%
Hispanic or Latino (of any race)	2,856	8.6%

=== 2000 census ===
At the 2000 census, there were 23,958 people, 9,425 households, and 6,399 families living in the CDP. The population density was 3,100.8 inhabitants per square mile (1,197.2/km^{2}). There were 10,000 housing units at an average density of 1,294.3 per square mile (499.7/km^{2}). The racial makeup of the CDP was 82.60% White, 13.21% African American, 0.60% Native American, 1.23% Asian, 0.03% Pacific Islander, 0.86% from other races, and 1.47% from two or more races. Hispanic or Latino of any race were 1.92% of the population.

Of the 9,425 households 33.1% had children under the age of 18 living with them, 46.0% were married couples living together, 16.1% had a female householder with no husband present, and 32.1% were non-families. 25.7% of households were one person and 9.8% were one person aged 65 or older. The average household size was 2.51 and the average family size was 2.99.

The age distribution was 25.9% under the age of 18, 8.0% from 18 to 24, 30.7% from 25 to 44, 22.2% from 45 to 64, and 13.1% 65 or older. The median age was 36 years. For every 100 females, there were 91.1 males. For every 100 females age 18 and over, there were 87.0 males.

== History ==
Middle River was once known as a "Little Appalachia". Before, during, and after World War II many Appalachian migrants settled in the Baltimore area, including Middle River. Appalachian people who migrated to Middle River were largely economic migrants who came looking for work.

== Schools ==
Victory Villa Elementary School was built in the 1930s to teach the children of the Martin Aerospace Center's employees. It was rebuilt in 2018.

Martin Boulevard Elementary School was built in the 1950s and rebuilt on the same property in the 1990s to accommodate the ever-expanding population in the Middle River Community.

Middle River Middle School, originally a junior high school housing seventh through ninth grades, now conforms to the Maryland shift in grades and houses sixth through eighth grades. Students feed into Kenwood High School, located on Stemmers Run Road in Essex. Glenmar Elementary School is located across from Middle River Middle School and Hawthorne Elementary borders Essex.

== See also ==
- Martin State Airport
- Bengie's Drive-In Theatre
