= Sun Picture Gardens =

Heritage listed cinema in Broome, Western Australia

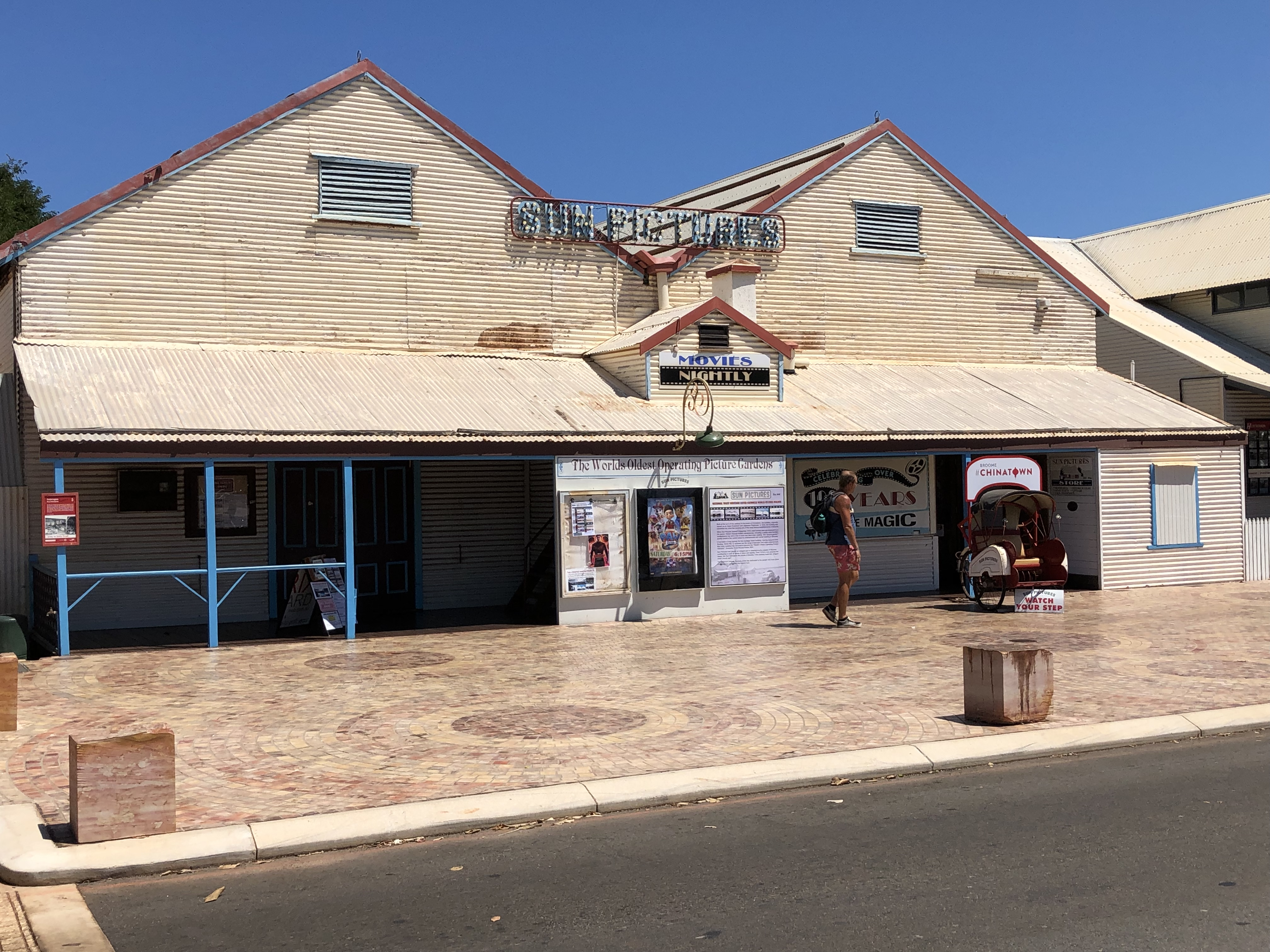
- The facade of the building in 2018

- Location within Western Australia
- 17.95344°S 122.24307°E
- Location: 8 Carnarvon Street; Broome WA 6725

History
- Built: 1916

Western Australia Heritage Register
- Type: State Registered Place
- Designated: 9 Feb 1996
- Reference no.: 293

The Sun Picture Gardens (also known as Sun Pictures) is the world's oldest picture gardens still in operation. It is located in Broome, Western Australia. Unlike most outdoor cinemas, it screens multiple films per night; the majority of outdoor cinemas screen one or two films a week.

== History ==
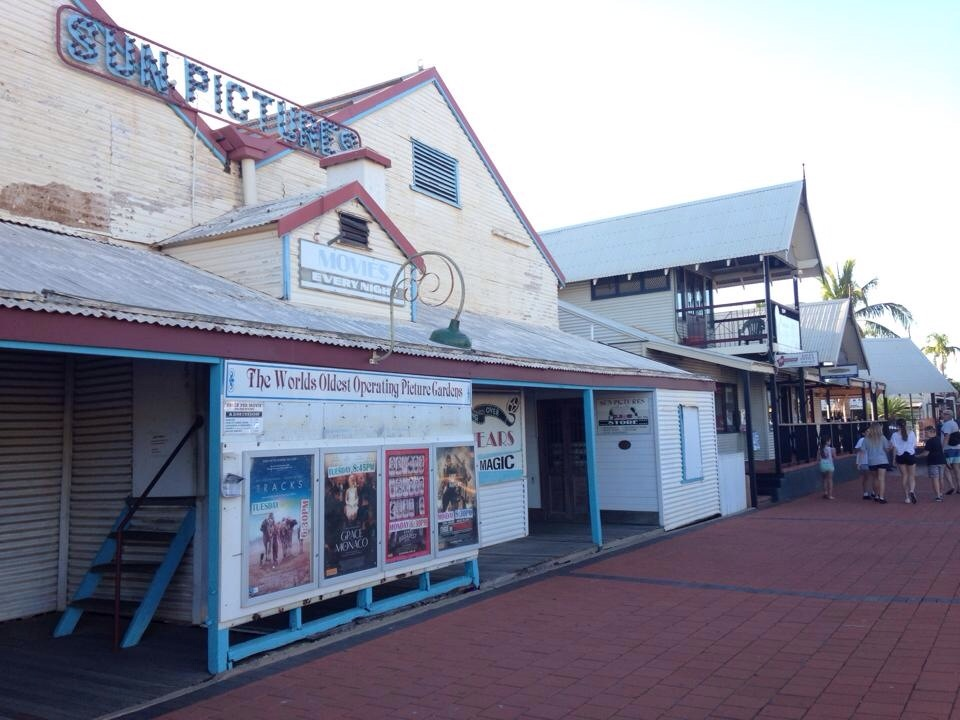
Sun Picture Gardens frontage

=== Yamsaki store ===
After Broome was established, a Chinatown area emerged after the town became home to a large Asian population. The Yamsaki family opened a store on Carnarvon Street in 1903, selling Asian clothing, food stuffs and other Asian goods. Their love of theatre eventually led them to devoting part of the building to a Noh theatre. In 1913, the building was purchased by master pearler Ted Hunter, who began converting the store into a cinema.

=== Silent movie era ===
Sun Pictures opened on 9 December 1916, with a full house. The first film to be played was a racing drama called Kissing Cup. From this era, a local personality spawned. Known as "Fairy", she became famous for her piano playing. The most played song was "If You Were the Only Girl (In the World)". In 1924, Sun Pictures was purchased by W.H. Milner and Leonard R. Knight; their wives manning the box office and handling public relations.

=== Sound era and World War Two ===
In 1933, the cinema was adapted for sound. The first sound film was Monte Carlo (1930). Milner died in 1940, and Knight returned to Perth. Milner's wife continued to run the cinema on her own until Broome was evacuated in 1942, just two days before a Japanese air raid. During or after the evacuation (no one is certain) projection equipment was vandalised. Army officers repaired it and used the cinema for themselves, but had difficulty changing reels, sometimes taking up to forty minutes to do so. During the change over, a record called You Look Like a Monkey When you Grow Old was played over and over until the projector was reloaded.

=== Tidal flooding ===
Almost every night, the cinema would be flooded. Some claimed you could catch a fish during the screening. Most nights, people would leave to find the street outside submerged. Men took this in their stride, carrying women to higher ground, no matter who they were.

=== Anderson era and racial discrimination ===
Up until 1967, Europeans who were considered most worthy were seated in the middle of the cinema, with their children up front. Other whites and Asians sat on the left side, while "coloured people" were forced to sit on hard wooden benches on the right and enter through a separate door. A boycott began just before anti-discrimination laws were brought in during 1967.

=== End of tidal flooding and restoration ===
In 1974, a levy was built to stop tidal flooding, making the cinema more enjoyable. In 1989, the cinema was listed on the Register of the National Estate, meaning that it can only be restored, but not altered in appearance or demolished. In 1995, the cinema was added to the State Register of Heritage Places due to its cultural and historical significance. Marrissa Ferraz bought the cinema in 1997 and began restoring it in 1999. In 2002, an indoor cinema called Sun Cinemas was opened, operating alongside Sun Pictures. Two years later, the cinema entered Guinness World Records for being the "Oldest Open Air Cinema in Operation".

=== Bran Nue Dae ===
In 2009, the cinema hosted the premiere of the Western Australian made musical film, Bran Nue Dae. The stars walked a red dirt carpet and Ernie Dingo performed the film's title song.

== See also ==
- Outdoor cinema
- List of drive-in theatres in Australia
- List of drive-in theaters
