= Creative cluster s52 =

Creative cluster s52 (Russian: Креативный кластер с52) is a coworking and creative space in Rostov-on-Don, Russia. It is located at 52 Suvorova Street (Kirovsky District).

== History ==
Creative cluster s52 was housed in a former warehouse and sewing factory with total area 2000 m^{2} in 2011 by design of Denis Zubkov who later was joined by Alexander Kuleshov. Now Alexander Kuleshov is a manager and owner of s52. The project was conceived as office space, environment for communication and collaborative work where creative industry representatives’ need for self-realization and development of urban projects would be fulfilled.

Alexander Kuleshov says that they wanted to do a project inspired by loft ideology. The building was being reconstructed gradually because of the selected financial scheme according to which managing company was renovating areas of common use while lessees, after moving in, did their own renovation to suit their concept.

Today Creative cluster s52 is a cultural and business center of Rostov-on-Don. It hosts different exhibitions, lections, film demonstrations, concerts and other events. Also youth garage sale is held here every month – it's a temporary drift store, tabletop sale and dress-crossing event.

== Opportunities in Creative cluster s52 ==
In the territory of Creative cluster s52 now there are:

- some fast food joints;
- a hairdressing salon;
- a barbershop;
- a makeup studio;
- a photo studio;
- a rooftop cinema;
- a coffee house;
- board games libraries;
- a bicycle-sharing center;
- individual offices;
- non-mass market shops;
- meeting and event rooms.
