= Coburg Drive-In =

Historic drive-in cinema in Melbourne, Australia

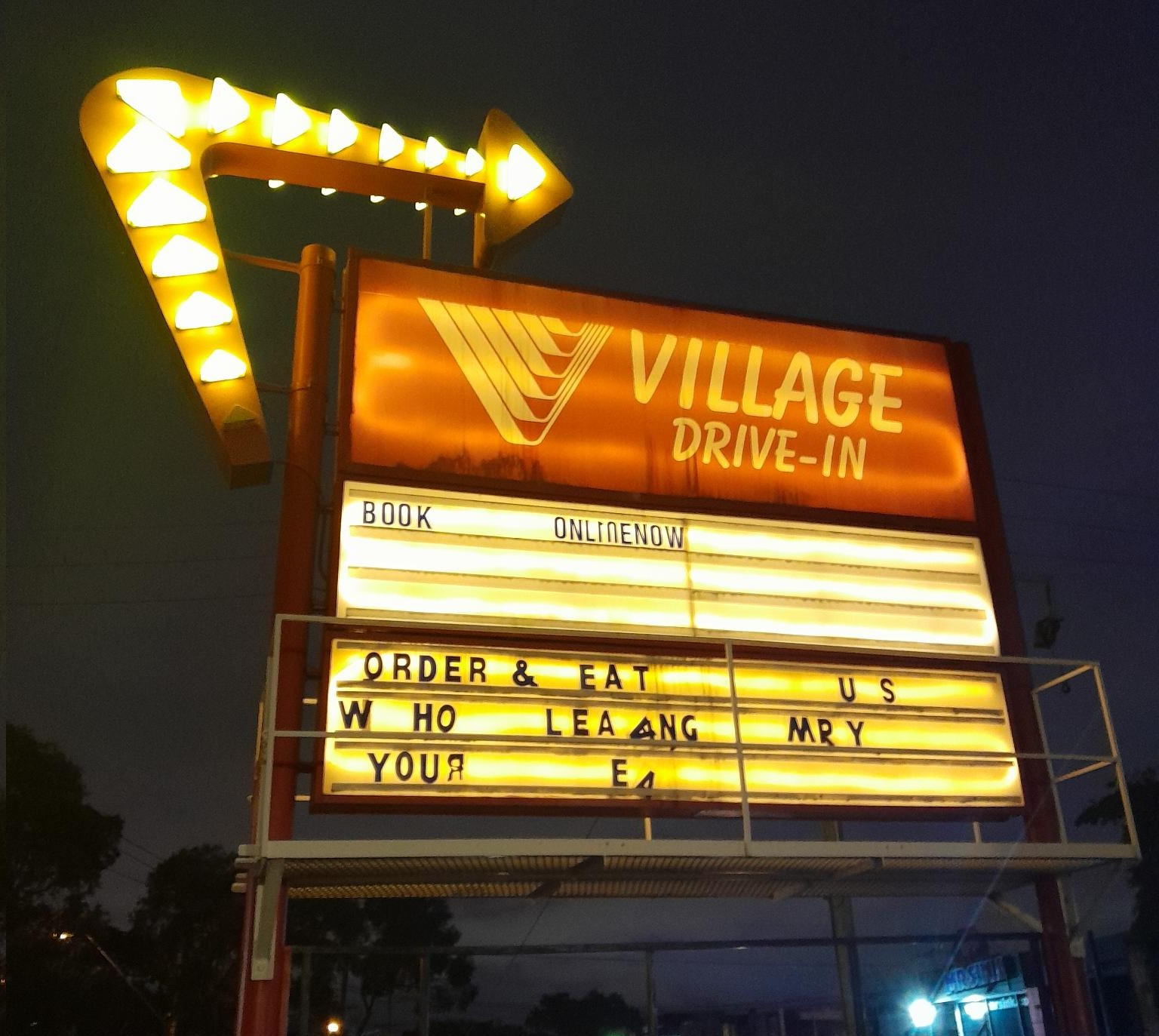
- The entrance sign from Newlands Road, 2023

- Location of the drive-in in Greater Metropolitan Melbourne
- Interactive map of Coburg Drive-In
- Full name: Village Drive-In (as per sign, 2023)
- Former names: Hoyts Drive In (1970–1985); Village Triple Drive-In (2000s)
- Address: 155 Newlands Road, Coburg North, Melbourne, Victoria, Australia
- Coordinates: 37°43′23″S 144°58′15″E
- Owner: Sillman and Sharp (1965–1967); Hoyts (1967–2018); Charter Hall (since 2018– )
- Operator: Big Six (1965–1967); Hoyts (1967–1984); (then JV from 1986– ); Village Cinemas (since 1986– )
- Seating type: Motor vehicles
- Capacity: 850 cars (1965–1987); 900 cars (since 1987– )
- Type: Drive-in theatre
- Screens: 3; (Screen 1: 33 m (108 ft) wide)

Construction
- Built: 1965
- Opened: 25 November 1965; 60 years ago
- Expanded: 1987 (second screen); 1995 (third screen)
- Years active: 1965–1984; since 1986–

Victorian Heritage Register
- Official name: Coburg Drive-In
- Type: Registered place
- Designated: 23 September 2010
- Reference no.: H2218
- Heritage overlay no.: HO445
- Category: Recreation and Entertainment

The Coburg Drive-In is a drive-in theatre located in Coburg North, an inner northern suburb of Melbourne, in Victoria, Australia. Operated by Village Cinemas, films are screened throughout daily at night, and the site is also used, during the day, for the Coburg Trash and Treasure Market on Sundays.

Completed in 1965, closed in 1984 and reopened in 1986, with additional screens added in 1987 and 1995, the drive-in remains one of two surviving drive-in theatres in Melbourne's greater metropolitan area, along with the Dromana 3 Drive-In on the Mornington Peninsula. The Coburg Drive-in was added to the Victorian Heritage Register on 23 September 2010 in recognition of its historical and social significance. The site was also added to a non-statutory list by the Victorian branch of the National Trust on 1 May 2007.

== History ==
The first American-style drive-in theatre to open in Australia was the Skyline in the Melbourne suburb of Burwood, in 1954.

=== 1965 to 1984 ===
The Coburg Drive-In opened on 25 November 1965 with a double feature of Marnie and McHale's Navy. The Big Six chain were the original owners for the first two years of operation, until Hoyts acquired the theatre in 1967.

Drive-ins grew out of the growing popularity of cars, and provided an easy and convenient form of entertainment. The Coburg Drive-in catered for people who had problems with parking and walking; young children; and teenagers and young adults who were attracted to particular film genres and intimate evenings. The 1960s and 1970s were the peak of drive-in culture's popularity in Melbourne, and at one stage the theatre competed with six other drive-ins within the surrounding suburbs alone; and approximately sixty drive-in theatres throughout Victoria.

In 1974, fire trucks from the Metropolitan Fire Brigade entered the drive-in with lights flashing to put out a grass fire along the banks of the adjoining Merri Creek. Coincidentally, the film screening that night was The Towering Inferno, which led many audience members to believe the fire trucks were part of a publicity stunt.

Drive-ins were popular until the late 1970s, with the supremacy of television, then home video in the 1980s, and multi-cinema complexes, audiences began to dwindle. In the 1980s, 23 theatres closed throughout the city and were sold to property developers. The Coburg Drive-In closed and was put up for sale in 1982. However, the land did not sell. This was said to be due to the site's location in a quiet industrial area, which made it unsuitable for residential development, while the poor road access down a single long driveway and unstable ground on the site of a former rubbish tip meant industrial development would also be difficult. The cinema ironically survived because of its poor location and access, which made the land unattractive to developers. The drive-in eventually closed in 1984.

=== 1986 to present ===
In 1986, Hoyts reopened the site as a joint venture with Village Cinemas, and a second screen was added in 1987. From this period, despite its obscure and unprofitable location, the Coburg Drive-In remained open where all others of its kind in the area had closed; and it dominated the market as drive-ins accumulated a retro cult following and again became fashionable.

On 3 May 1987, a film entitled Automania at the Drive-In was screened as part of the Automania series of car-themed events around the city conceived by artists Ted Hopkins and Sue McCauley. The film was a custom 75-minute compilation of car chase scenes from various films, including Mad Max and The Terminator. This was followed by a live reading of Gerald Murnane's novel Landscape with Landscape, set to an experimental film by Peter Lyssiotis called Lonesome Trees that consisted of photos of trees in bleak urban settings. The 900-strong audience of local car enthusiasts reacted with violent disapproval, threatening to invade the projection room and leading to a near-riot. Order was restored with the Whoopi Goldberg film Burglar.

Since at least 1988, the site has been utilised on Sundays for the Coburg Trash and Treasure Market.

A third screen was installed in 1995.

In 2018, the land was sold to the Charter Hall property development group for $12.5 million and leased back to Village Cinemas until 2028. David Harrison of Charter Hall described their purchase as a "mid-ring infill investment opportunity (with) better use in the long-term" and did not specify details beyond that, especially given the heritage listing. The site's future beyond 2028 is yet to be determined.

In 2020 and 2021, the drive-in was allowed to remain open under strict conditions during various stages of the COVID-19 pandemic lockdowns, when regular cinemas remained closed across the city.

== Layout ==
The theatre is accessed via a long driveway that extends from Newlands Road into the triple-screen field. Visitors are greeted by a large sign installed in 2008 that features a lit-up arrow directing cars inside. A ticket booth at the end of the driveway features a vintage Dodge Phoenix car attached to the roof, originally red, and subsequently repainted yellow. The field is surrounded by warehouses to the south and east, and Merri Creek to the north and west. As a result, the drive-in has limited residential neighbours.

Sound was once accessed via speakers on poles in the traditional drive-in style and, since 1978, has offered sound via FM radio. The poles remain extant, however the speakers were removed. The central building in the field includes a 1950s-style snack bar, toilets, and a children's playground. At 33 metres (108 ft) wide, cinema 1 is the largest of the three screens, and is also the largest outdoor cinema screen in the Southern Hemisphere. Originally opened with access for 850 cars, with the addition of the second screen in 1987, capacity was expanded to accommodate 900 cars on the same footprint.

== In media ==
In 1991, the film Holidays on the River Yarra featured a scene filmed at the drive-in in which the two young protagonists attempt to sell ill-gotten car parts at the Trash and Treasure Market. In 2021, the drive-in was used both as a filming location and premiere venue for the Mad Max documentary, Beyond the Wasteland.

== See also ==
- List of drive-in theatres in Australia
- List of places on the Victorian Heritage Register in the City of Merri-bek

== Additional reading ==
- Broome, Richard (1987). Coburg : Between Two Creeks. Lothian. ISBN 978-0-85091-278-4.
- Chatham, Lyn (2002). The Paddock on the Edge of Town.
- Wright, Tony (10 September 2016). "Nostalgia has limits, even for drive-in movies". The Age. p. 26. ISSN 0312-6307.

== Further links ==
- "Coburg Triple Drive-in". Drive-Ins Downunder. December 1999. Archived from the original (includes historical images) on 16 February 2011.
