= Shankweiler's Drive-In Theatre =

Drive-in movie theater in Pennsylvania

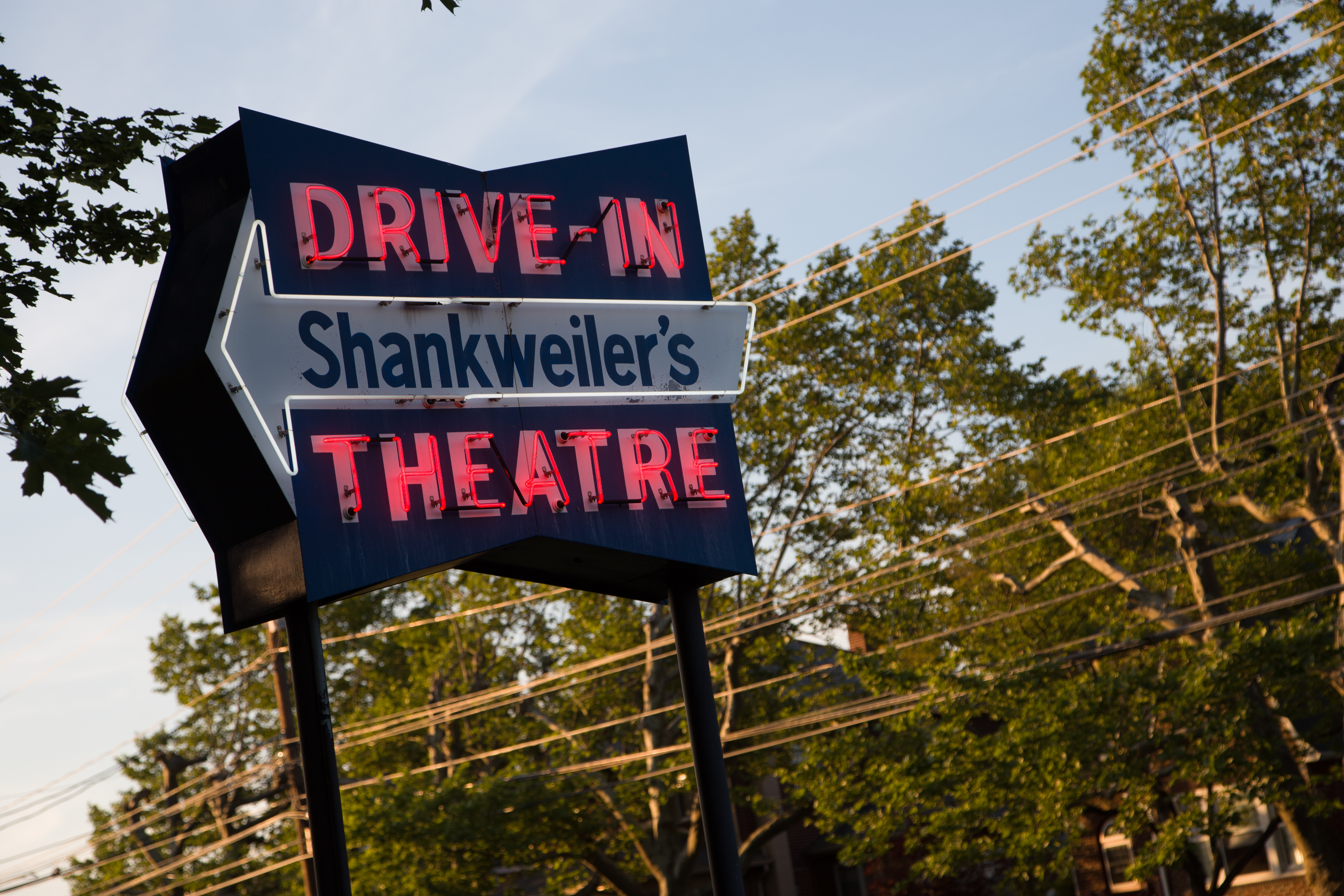
- Interactive map of Shankweiler's Drive-In Theatre
- Location: Orefield, Pennsylvania, U.S.
- Coordinates: 40°38′42.11″N 75°35′40.32″W
- Capacity: 300 cars

Construction
- Opened: April 15, 1934

Website
- www.shankweilers.com

Shankweiler's Drive-In Theatre is a single-screen drive-in movie theater located off of PA Route 309 in Orefield, Pennsylvania, United States. It is the oldest operational drive-in theater in the world The four acre theater generally operates during weekends in the colder months, while playing films seven days per week during the summer season. Admission gives patrons access to both nightly movie showings.

== History ==
Shankweiler's was opened by Wilson Shankweiler on April 15, 1934, making it the first drive-in theater to open in the state of Pennsylvania and the second drive-in theater to open in the entire United States. While passing through Camden, New Jersey, Shankweiler had learned about the first-ever American drive-in theater, opened less than a year before by Richard Hollingshead. He decided to bring the business to Pennsylvania with the goal or attracting visitors to his other businesses. Originally located behind his restaurant and inn, the original drive-in was called Shankweiler's Auto Park and described as a "bedsheet hung between two poles." While the theater initially showed silent films, audio was later broadcast to the audience through two large speakers. According to future owner Paul Geissinger, the lot had previously been a landing strip behind the hotel for pilots to fly in to visit.

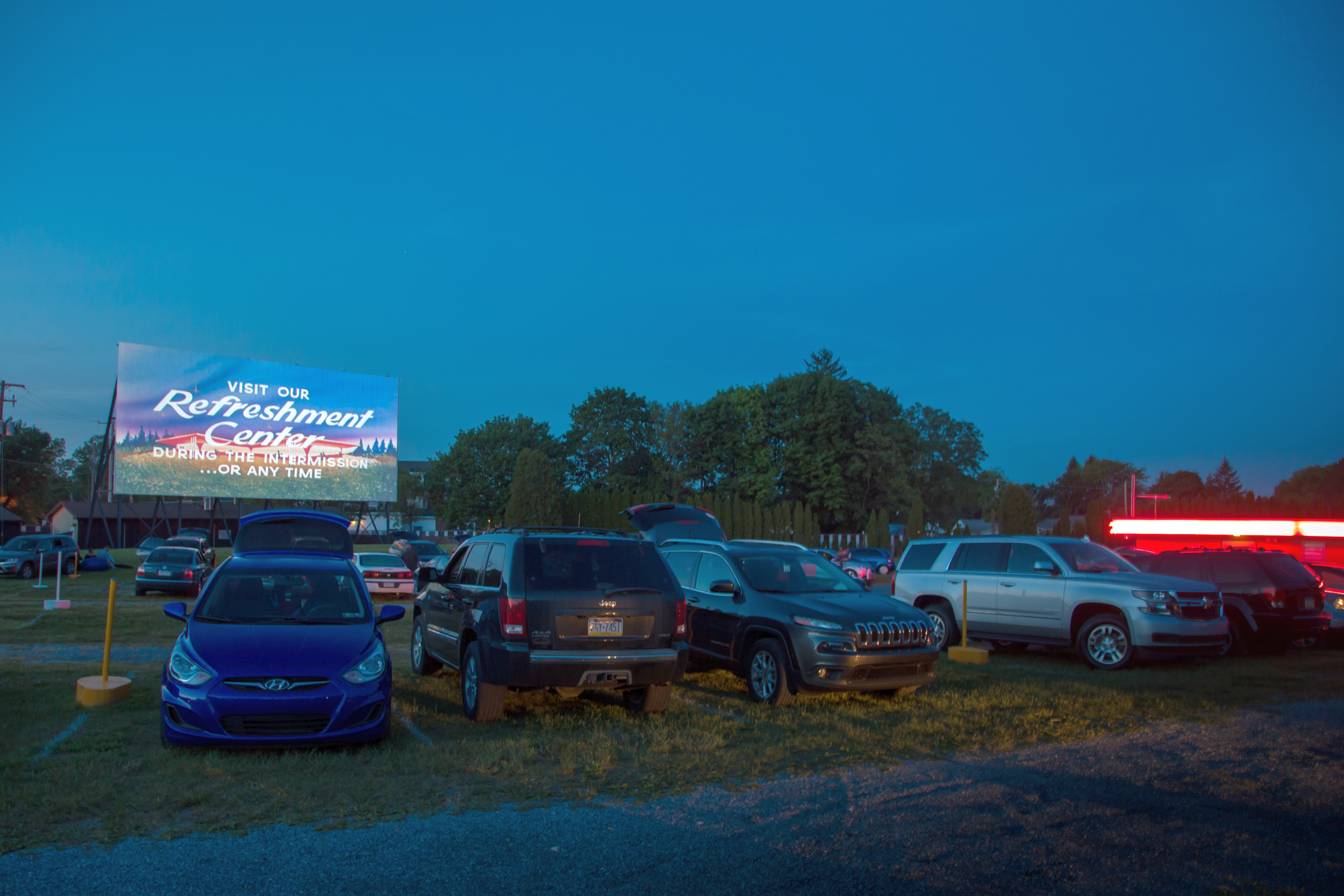
2017

In 1939, a new model RCA Victor projector was introduced. In 1948, Shankweiler's installed speaker poles and car speakers. Hurricane Diane in 1955 caused severe damage to the screen and projection booth at Shankweiler's, prompting the construction of a new snack bar/projection booth and installation of a new CinemaScope movie screen.

The Shankweiler family continued to run the businesses, selling the restaurant in the mid-1950s. Shankweiler died in 1963 and the drive-in was sold in 1965 to Robert Malkames who had been leasing it for several years prior. Under Malkames' ownership, the theater in 1982 adopted micro-vicinity AM radio broadcasting to deliver movie soundtracks to patrons, though the car speakers remained in place.

Malkames sold Shankweiler's to Paul and Susan Geissinger in 1984. Paul Geissinger had worked at Shankweiler's since 1971, beginning shortly after his high school graduation. In 1986, Shankweiler's became an early adopter of delivering movie sound via FM broadcast stereo; although their website describes them as "the 1st Drive-in to feature audio in FM broadcast Stereo," the Dromana 3 Drive-In in Melbourne, Australia had introduced FM stereo two years earlier in 1984. Later, Shankweiler's sound system was upgraded in 2002, and featured fully digital video projection and sound equipment in 2013. The 2013 conversion to digital cost $120,000 and was necessary to continue showing new releases, which would no longer be distributed in 35 mm.

In 2005 and again in 2010, Shankweiler's was used as a filming location for the movies Rounding First and Bereavement. In 2015, the Geissingers listed Shankweiler's Drive-In for sale, and then re-listed it for sale in 2018, with an asking price of $1.2 million.

In November 2022, the theater was sold for $1.05 million to Matthew McClanahan and Lauren McChesney of The Moving Picture Cinema, a mobile movie theater based out of Allentown, Pennsylvania. The theater resumed operations and is now open year-round. In April, 2024 the drive-in celebrated its 90th anniversary.
