= Dromana 3 Drive-In =

Historic drive-in cinema in Melbourne, Australia

- Location of the drive-in in Greater Metropolitan Melbourne
- Interactive map of Dromana 3 Drive-In
- Former names: Peninsula Drive-In (1960s–1980s); Dromana Twin Drive-In; Dromana Drive-In
- Address: 133 Nepean Highway; Dromana, Mornington Peninsula, Melbourne, Victoria; Australia
- Coordinates: 38°19′47″S 144°59′48″E
- Owner: Frank Whitaker (1962–1989); Paul Whitaker (since 1989)
- Operator: Whitaker family
- Seating type: Motor vehicles
- Capacity: 485 cars (1962)
- Type: Drive-in theatre
- Screen: 3; plus 1 outdoor cinema

Construction
- Built: 1961–1962
- Opened: 1962; 64 years ago
- Expanded: 1992 (second screen); 2001 (third screen)

Website
- dromanadrivein.com.au

Victorian Heritage Register
- Official name: Dromana Drive-In
- Type: Registered place
- Designated: 23 September 2010
- Reference no.: H2219
- Heritage overlay no.: HO407
- Category: Recreation and Entertainment

The Dromana 3 Drive-In, also known as the Dromana Drive-In, is an independently-operated drive-in theatre, located at 133 Nepean Highway, Dromana, on the Mornington Peninsula, in the south eastern suburbs of Melbourne, in Victoria, Australia.

Opened in 1962, it is the oldest continuously operating drive-in in Australia; and it is one of two surviving drive-in theatres in Melbourne's greater metropolitan area, along with the Coburg Drive-In. The Dromana 3 Drive-In was added to the Victorian Heritage Register on 23 September 2010 in recognition of its historical significance; and was added to a non-statutory list by the Victorian branch of the National Trust on 1 May 2007.

== History ==
=== Context ===
The first American-style drive-in theatre to open in Australia was the Skyline in the Melbourne suburb of Burwood, in 1954.

Drive-ins grew out of the growing popularity of cars, and provided an easy and convenient form of entertainment. They catered for people who had problems with parking and walking; young children; and teenagers and young adults who were attracted to particular film genres and intimate evenings. The 1960s and 1970s were the peak of drive-in culture's popularity in Greater Melbourne; and approximately sixty drive-in theatres operated throughout Victoria. Drive-ins were popular until the late 1970s, with the supremacy of television, then home video in the 1980s, and multi-cinema complexes, audiences began to dwindle. In the 1980s, 23 theatres closed throughout the city and were sold to property developers.

=== Drive-In on the Mornington Peninsula ===
The Dromana 3 Drive-In opened as the Peninsula Drive-In in 1962, with original owner Frank Whitaker, who was involved in the cinema industry since the 1930s. Paul Whitaker, son of Frank, took over management in 1989.

In 1984, the Peninsula Drive-in became the first in the world to offer true stereo sound via an FM radio signal. Though a similar service was being offered in some drive-ins through CINE-FI, it was either on the AM band with lower sound quality and only in mono, or in FM but in an artificially mixed "stereo."

A second screen was added in 1992 after being disassembled and transported over from the former Hoyts Altona drive-in after it closed. A third screen followed in 2001. A fourth screen was later added, but it is a more traditional outdoor cinema setup with deck chairs and not a drive-in like the others.

Several concerts were held at the Dromana Drive-In during the 1980s and 1990s, most notably a festival on New Year's Eve 1994 featuring Silverchair, TISM, The Meanies and an early-morning screening of Pink Floyd The Wall. The aftermath on the morning of New Year's Day 1995 was described by police as "resembling a war zone", as roughly 200 people had decided to sleep off their hangovers on the premises.

In 2013, a large model of an X-wing fighter from the Star Wars films was added to the roof of the entrance ticket booths. This has since become the theatre's signature landmark.

In 2020 and 2021, the Dromana Drive-In was one of the few cinemas allowed to remain open during various stages of the COVID-19 pandemic in Melbourne and resultant lockdowns in which all indoor cinemas were closed. After a period of mandated closure during 2021, the Dromana Drive-In reopened with a live screening of a St. Kilda Saints versus Hawthorn Hawks football match.

== Description ==
The layout of the drive-in has changed to adapt to the introduction of each of the three screens. The six-hectare (fifteen-acre) site is divided into three fields separated by white picket fences. Berms have been constructed in each field to elevate the noses of cars toward each screen. Sound was originally delivered to the cars via a small speaker that clipped onto a side window of the car. The speakers were attached to posts located to the side of each parking space. In 1999 the speakers were removed, though the posts remain.

Originally a simple skillion-roofed timber-framed fibro-clad structure, this building has been significantly altered. Two simple fibro-clad ticket booths joined by a flat roof are located at the end of the drive. An original 'Peninsula' neon sign is attached to the rear of the original screen. A 1950s-style diner, named Shel's Diner after its operator, Shelly Whitaker, was completed as a homage to Mel's Drive-In in San Francisco, California.

In addition to screening films, community groups for school graduation ceremonies, local plays, and church group sessions can be arranged at the Dromana Drive-In.

== See also ==
- List of drive-in theatres in Australia
- List of places on the Victorian Heritage Register in the Shire of Mornington Peninsula
