= Anatoly Sobino Park =

Memorial Park

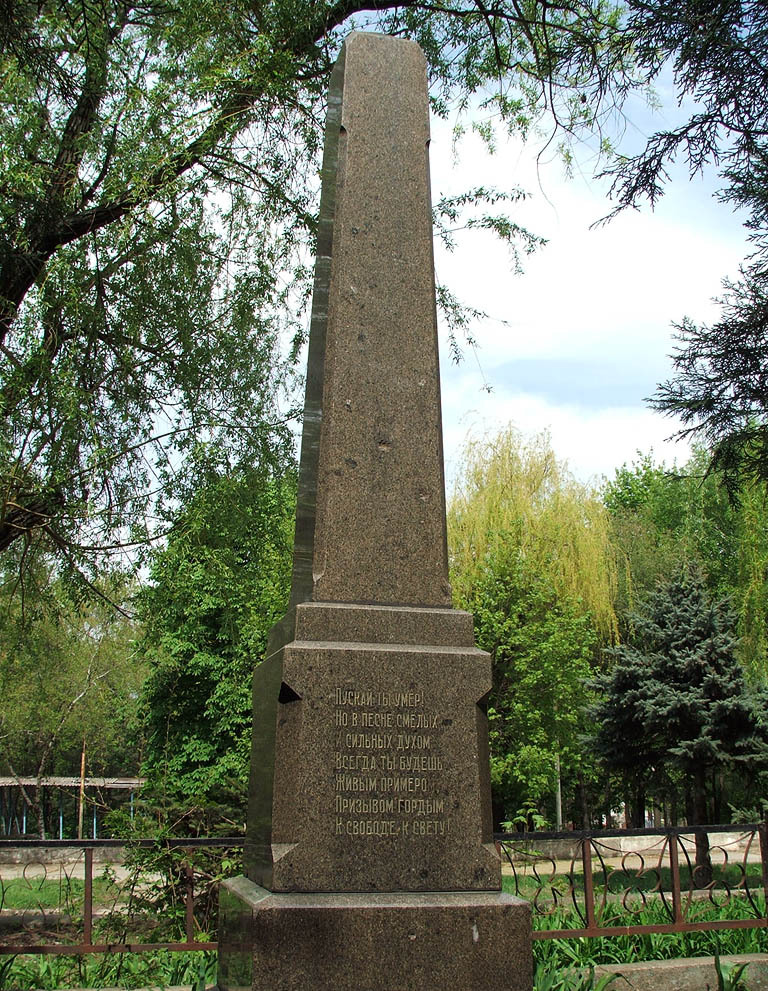
- Monument to Anatoly Sobino
- Interactive map of Anatoly Sobino Park
- Location: Rostov-on-Don, Russia
- Coordinates: 47.1310°N 39.4016°E

Anatoly Sabino Park (Russian: Парк имени Анатолия Собино) is a park in Zheleznodorozhny District of Rostov-on-Don. It is named after Russian revolutionary Anatoly Sobino, who is buried at its territory.

== History and description ==
Before the park was established, at its territory had been Lengorod Garden, which was considered the main park of Zatemernitsky Settlement, a historical part of Rostov-on-Don.

In times of the Soviet Union, the park was a small piece of greenery. There also was a Ferris wheel, children's attractions, a summer stage, an open-air cinema and a planetarium.

In the 21st century, many structures in the park came to a state of disrepair and required to be restored. At the whole territory there are fragments of old buildings, among them — remains of the summer stage, which is surrounded by bricks and building blocks, as well as by a brick wall. Most of the benches were broken as well as the sidewalks. Rostov-on-Don dwellers usually call this park "skvernyi skver" (ugly square in English).

In 2006 the park was granted the status of a square. The territory underwent some changes: the trees in emergent condition were cut off, dilapidated buildings were partly demolished. In 2014 the park was again partly landscaped.

In December 2017 an Orthodox chapel constructed at the territory of the park, which was meant to be transformed into a church, was a subject of arson. It is presumed that the arson was committed by some of the local residents who were hostile to the idea of construction of a new chapel in the city district.

In 2021, the Fathers' Alley of 20 blue spruces and 30 linden trees was laid in the park. The planting of the Alley was dedicated to Father's Day, annually celebrated in Russia in October.
