= Hot Tub Cinema =

Cinematic event company

Hot Tub Cinema is a cinematic experience created in 2012.

== Overview ==
Created by Asher Charman, the events combine popular films with hot tubs, often in unusual spaces such as rooftops, old factories or abandoned train stations (such as the former Shoreditch tube station, London). In addition to watching a film, cinema-goers have the opportunity to celebrate after the film with a VJ-led party.

In addition to shows in London, Hot Tub Cinema events have been held in New York City, Ibiza, and in several cities around the UK.

== Notable screenings ==
In addition to regular shows, Hot Tub Cinema has also been involved in several film & TV launches, such as a one-off launch screening Spring Breakers which included an appearance from the writer/director Harmony Korine. Held in an abandoned fire station in South London, in addition to the film and afterparty guests could experience recreations of iconic scenes throughout the venue.

They also created an event for a DVD launch of The Walking Dead, which included (real) roast squirrel and a tub full of blood and limbs.

== See also ==
- Outdoor cinema
