= Orefield, Pennsylvania =

Unincorporated community in Pennsylvania, US

- Unincorporated community
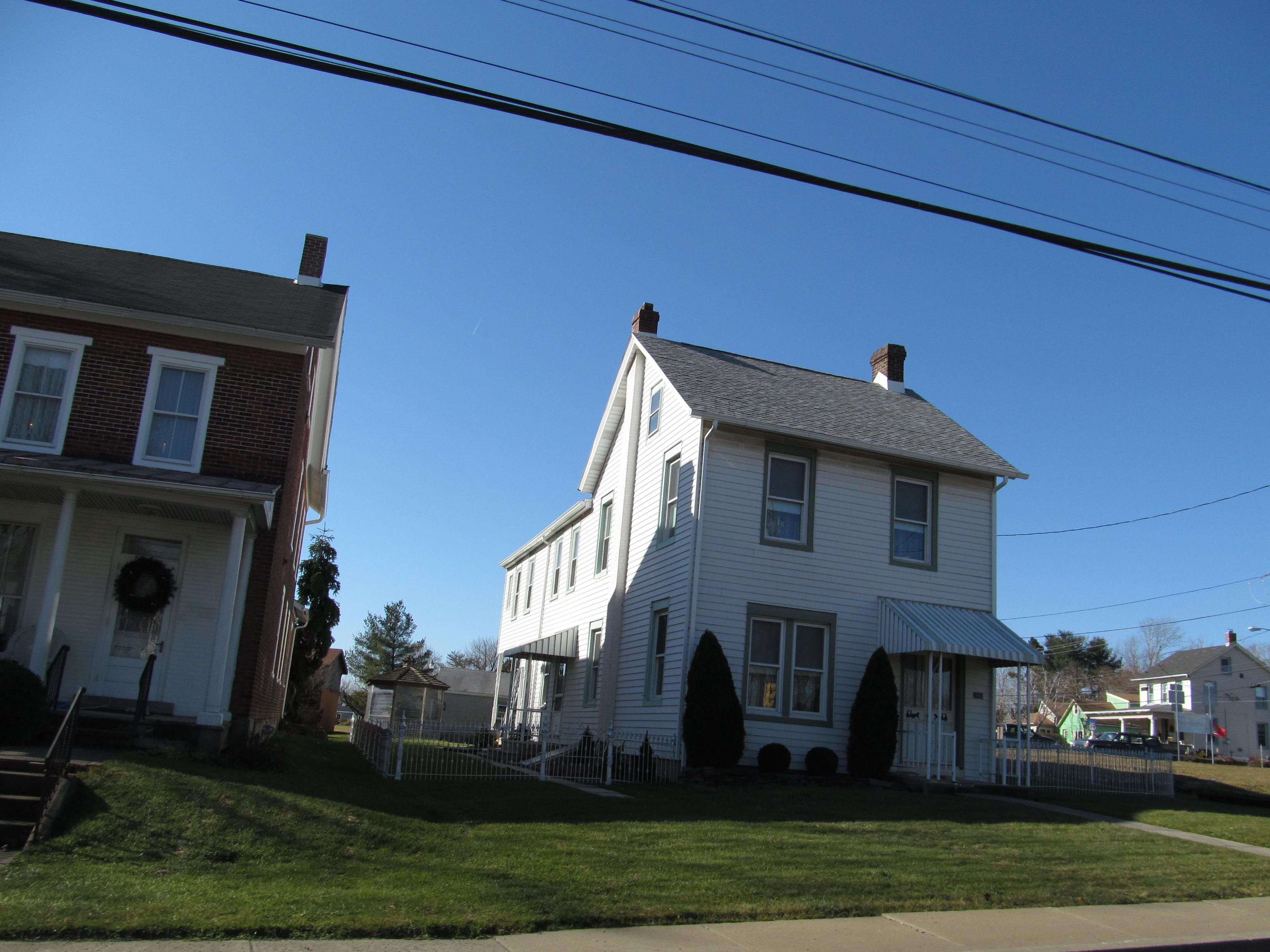
- Homes in Orefield in January 2013

- Location within Pennsylvania
- Coordinates: 40°38′05″N 75°35′04″W
- Country: United States
- State: Pennsylvania
- County: Lehigh
- Township: North Whitehall and South Whitehall
- Elevation: 453 ft (138 m)

Population
  - Metro: 865,310 (US: 68th)
- Time zone: UTC-5 (Eastern (EST))
  - Summer (DST): UTC-4 (EDT)
- ZIP code: 18069
- Area codes: 610 and 484
- GNIS feature ID: 1183034
- Primary airport: Lehigh Valley International Airport
- Major hospital: Lehigh Valley Hospital–Cedar Crest
- School district: Parkland

Orefield is a small unincorporated community in Lehigh County, Pennsylvania. The community is split between North Whitehall and South Whitehall townships. Orefield is part of the Lehigh Valley, which has a population of 861,899 and is the 68th-most populous metropolitan area in the U.S. as of the 2020 census.

Located along Pennsylvania Route 309, Orefield has the ZIP Code of 18069. Its name is derived from the extensive deposits of limonite (iron ore) once mined here. It was once the terminus of the Siegersville Branch of the Ironton Railroad, which was extended here to haul the ore. Orefield is the former home to Parkland High School. It is located outside of Allentown. Orefield is surrounded by many suburban housing developments, many of which were former farms operated by the Pennsylvania Dutch whose influence in the community is waning. Several covered bridges nearby cross the Jordan Creek.

Located near Orefield is a large factory for Alpo a dog food company, which has been owned by Ralston Purina since the 1990s. Also located nearby are the Jaindl turkey farms; Orefield's turkey farms provide the already-slaughtered turkeys that are presented to the president of the United States each Thanksgiving; the live turkeys that are pardoned at the same presentation come from rotating locations). Located in Orefield is Shankweiler's Drive-In Theatre, the second drive-in ever built (1934) and America's oldest operating drive-in theater.

== Education ==
Orefield is served by the Parkland School District, which has Orefield Middle School in the village. The district's high school was located in Orefield until 1999, when it moved to Cedar Crest Boulevard to the east. Kernsville Elementary School is located just west of the village. Students in grades nine through 12 attend Parkland High School, the state's fourth-largest public high school, in South Whitehall Township.

== Notable residents ==
- Greg DeLong, former professional football player for the Minnesota Vikings, Baltimore Ravens, and Jacksonville Jaguars
- Carson Kressley, television personality, author, and designer
- Brant Weidner, former professional basketball player, San Antonio Spurs
