= List of drive-in theatres in Australia =

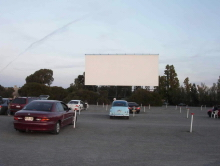
Mainline Drive-in Theatre Gepps Cross, South Australia in April 2006

Drive-in theatres (also known as drive-in cinemas or just drive-ins) were once very popular in Australia. Although considered an American invention, there is evidence of outdoor cinemas in Western Australia where some patrons attended in their cars as far back as 1938, and it is possible that these facilities may even predate the first American-style drive-in theatre.

== History ==
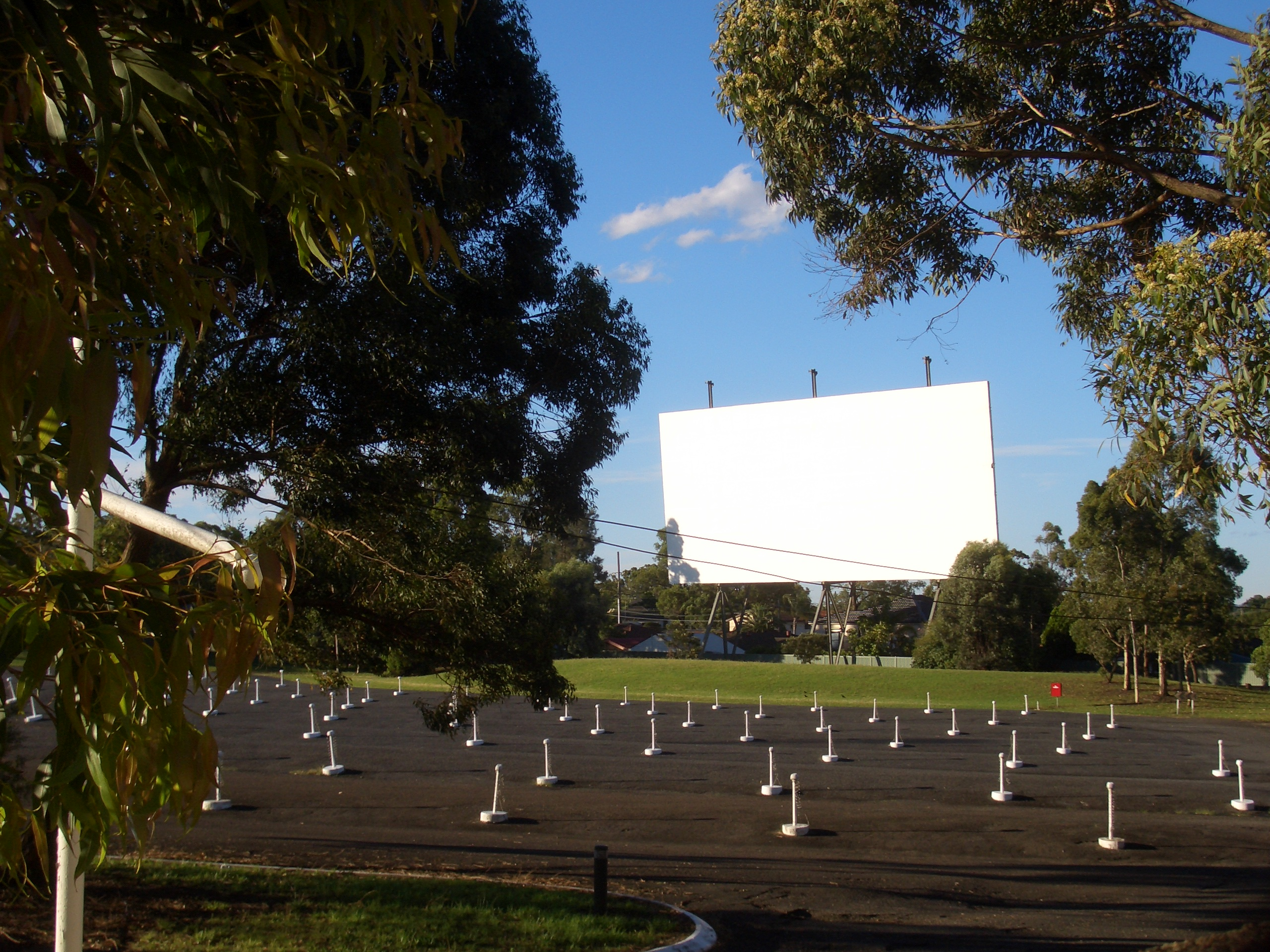
Bass Hill Drive-In Cinema

The first American-style drive-in theatre to open in Australia was the Skyline in the Melbourne suburb of Burwood on 18 February 1954. It was the first of 330 drive-in theatres that would open across Australia.

Many have since closed, with the large amounts of land taken up by drive-ins being sold off to build houses or shopping centres, although in recent years a number of drive-in theatres have reopened or expanded the number of screens available.

In the 1990s, the Coburg Drive-In in Melbourne was expanded to three screens, as was the Dromana 3 Drive-In In more recent times, the former Dandenong Panoramic Drive-in, in Victoria, has been reopened as the Lunar Drive-in Theatre and now has four screens making it Australia's largest drive-in theatre with the most screen choice.

In 2002 the Rodeo Drive-in at Mareeba, near Cairns, re-opened, with the Tivoli Drive-in near Ipswich re-opening in 2008.

Dromana Drive In is the longest continually running in Australia. It was opened in 1961 and has never closed.

The longest-running Drive In Theatres in Western Australia that is still open today are located in Dongara. This opened in 1967 and still operates every summer, the projector has been upgraded to digital to show the latest movies.

Along with a few metropolitan operations, there are a number of drive-in theatres serving remote communities such as Jericho in Queensland.

== By state and territory ==
The remaining drive-ins provide a glimpse of what was a very popular pastime in the 1950s and 1960s. The following is a listing of Australia's remaining open drive-in theatres. It includes portable operations in which patrons can either drive or sit down to see a movie outdoors.

=== Australian Capital Territory ===
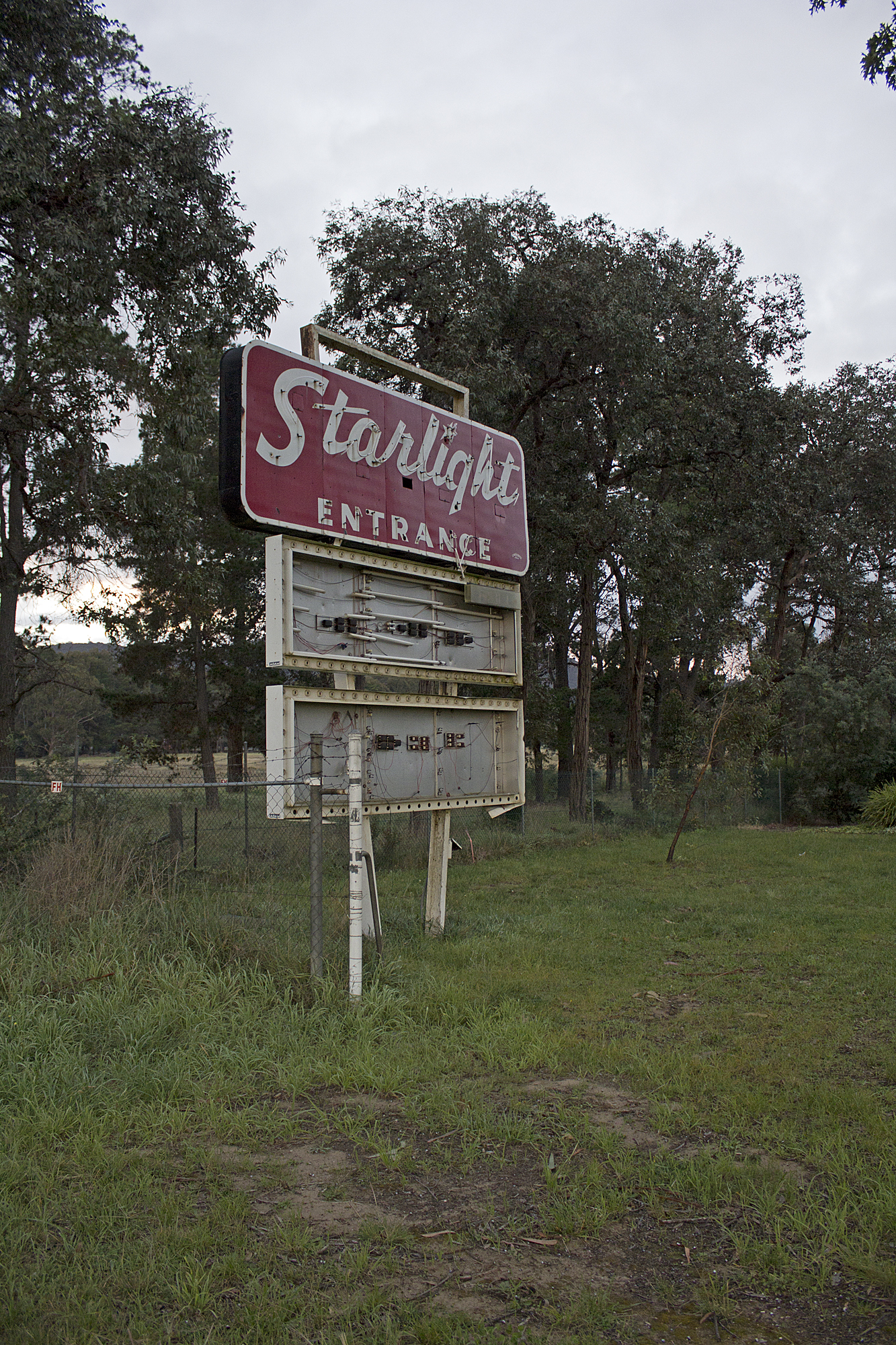
Former Starlight drive-in sign, first neon sign in Canberra and the only drive-in sign in Australia that is still in its original location.

The ACT had two drive-in theatres, the Starlight in Watson (opened in January 1957 and closed in 1993), which has now been redeveloped for medium-density housing, and the Sundown at Narrabundah (opened in 1968 and closed in 1984), which is now a motel and private housing village.

On 2 February 2018, the Southern Cross Drive-In theatre opened just over the ACT border in Queanbeyan. However, it was only open for a month when it closed on 3 March after a severe storm damaged the screen.

=== New South Wales ===
The Skyline drive-ins at Frenchs Forest and Dundas were Sydney's first. They opened simultaneously on Wednesday 24 October 1956, with Frenchs Forest screening 3 Ring Circus and Dundas screening The Racers.

The Skyline on Johnston Rd in Bass Hill opened in November 1956, with a 724 car capacity and until its closure in September 2007 was Australia's oldest continually operating drive-in theatre.

The Chullora Metro Twin drive-in was opened by Metro-Goldwyn-Mayer Pty. Ltd. in October 1956 with Chips Rafferty in Walk Into Hell. It was taken over by Greater Union in 1971 but closed in 1979. It was Australia's first twin-screen drive-in.

North Ryde drive-in, on the corner of Lane Cove and Waterloo Roads, opened in December 1956, accommodated 620 cars and operated for 30 years from December 1956. It was operated by Consolidated Drive-In Theatres Property Ltd. It closed in February 1986. The site was redeveloped for industrial uses.

Caringbah Skyline drive-in on Taren Point Rd opened in 1956 and closed in 1988. It is now occupied by a retail development.

In the southwestern suburbs of Sydney, El Rancho drive-in opened in March 1957 on Hamilton Road in the then rural locality of Fairfield West, and closed as the Skyline drive-in in 1984. The site is now occupied by Mary McKillop College Wakely (the name change from Fairfield West occurred in the early 1980s as the area was urbanised). Later came the Prestons drive-in, which had closed by the early 1990s.

The Matraville Star Drive-In opened in August 1958, and was operated by Star Drive-In Property Ltd. In 1971 it was re-named Skyline Matraville but closed in August 1984.

In the Western Suburbs, the Blacktown (Prospect) Skyline drive-in opened in December 1963 as a single screen site, with a second screen being added in the 1980s. Until recently the Blacktown Skyline Drive In was one of Sydney's last remaining drive-ins. It was the first of the Consolidated circuit to add a second screen in 1984 and has a capacity of 700 cars. It is currently operated by Event Cinemas. The Penrith Starline drive-in opened in 1965 and in 1970 was brought by Consolidated Drive-In Theatres Property Ltd and renamed Penrith Skyline drive-in. It was taken over by Hoyts Theatres in March 1979, taken over by Greater Union in 1982, and closed in August 1984.

Warriewood drive-in opened in September 1971 and closed in August 1984. It was then used as a plant nursery, but later demolished for residential development.

Probably the last of Sydney's drive-ins to be built, the Parklea Skyline drive-in opened in December 1976 with Rachel Roberts in 'Picnic At Hanging Rock'. It lasted less than eight years, closing in August 1984. Parklea Market then occupied the site.

In Lambton in Newcastle the Skyline drive-in opened in December 1956 at a cost of $200,000, with a capacity for 722 cars and a holding area for a further 420. It closed in June 1985.

In Wollongong, the Southline drive-in, on the corner of the Princes Hwy and Balgownie Rd in Fairy Meadow opened in October 1957 with 'Picnic'. It closed in March 1984. The Lakeline drive-in, located on Kanahooka Rd, Kanahooka, opened in November 1967 with 'Divorce, American Style'. It closed in March 1986. There is now a summer outdoor cinema held periodically in the Wollongong Botanic Gardens.

The Village Orange drive-in opened on 8 October 1970 but closed in the early 1980s. From then until 2018, when it was demolished, it was used for various types of open-air markets.

In Thurgoona in Albury, the Stargazer drive-in opened in October 1972. It closed in December 1990.

The Sturt drive-in in Wagga Wagga opened in February 1959. It closed in the late 1980s and was demolished sometime after 1998. The site is now occupied by retail.

The Taree drive-in, located on Bushland Drive, opened around 1970 but closed in the mid-1980s. The site remains unused, with the concession stand, ramps and ticket booths still standing as of 2019.

Coffs Harbour drive-in opened in February 1972 and closed in September 1988. It was demolished in December 1988 for an industrial estate.

At Narellan, the Gayline drive-in opened in November 1967 and closed in 1990. It has been demolished and the site has been redeveloped for housing.

The opening date of the Lismore drive-in is not known, but was before 1973. It has been demolished.

Tweed Heads drive-in opened in December 1971 and is thought to have closed in the 1990s. The site was brought by Gold Coast Airport for carparking.

The Armidale Drive-In was located on Mossman St and opened in the 1970s and closed in 1986.

In Broken Hill, the Bel-Air drive-in opened in the early 1960s, and closed in 1989. It has since been demolished.

Several smaller community drive-ins remain in rural NSW.

- Tamworth Drive-in theatre opened in July 1965 and closed circa 1980. Featured a children's playground and mini-golf with full food amenities.
- Heddon Greta Skyline (1 screen): Heddon Greta Drive-in was opened in the 1960s, but between 1984 and 1996 the theatre was closed; however, it has been reopened. The theatre has a capacity of 676 cars. It is currently operated by Skyline (Greater Union/Hoyts) and Donna and Scott Seddon. The land has been sold, and the cinema is set to close in November 2026.
- Dubbo Westview Drive In (1 screen), Closed in the mid-1980s, recently restored and reopened to special events.

In 2010 a new seasonal facility with a blow up screen was proposed Randwick Racecourse. In 2020, the Mov'in Car drive-in theatre opened on the rooftop car park at the Entertainment Quarter in Moore Park.

=== Northern Territory ===
Darwin was home to the Paspalis (Nightcliff) Drive-in Theatre, the largest privately owned drive-in located in Australia, which was opened in 1965 and closed in 1985. The Alice Springs Star line Drive-in operated from 1975 to 1990, closing when the Alice Springs Cinema opened in 1989. There are currently no operating drive-ins in the territory. The Tennant Creek drive-in ran 1972–84 and Katherine hosted one on Bogart Rd.

=== Queensland ===
Queensland had at one stage over 50 drive-ins. Now all of the suburban Brisbane drive-in theatres have closed leaving the Gold Coast's Yatala as the closest drive-in theatres to Brisbane. In rural Queensland however, there are still a number of drive-in theatres operating.

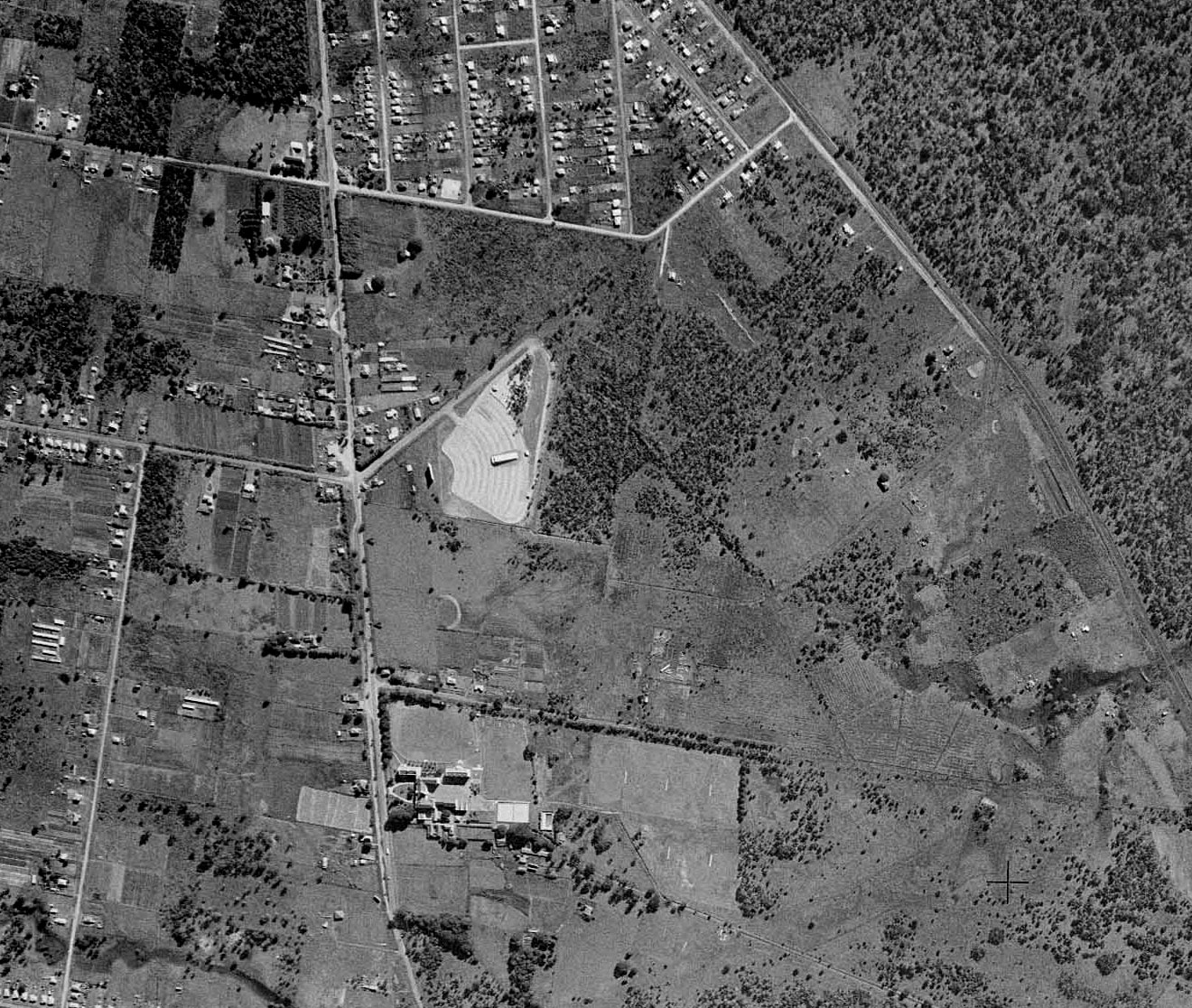
Boondall Drive-In, May 1958

Brisbane's first drive-in was the Capalaba which opened in 1955. The Boondall Drive-in opened on 8 February 1956, at the time it had the largest screen in Australia. Kids were well catered for with a Merry-Go-Round, miniature Cobb & Co coach and Shetland Ponies to ride (Brisbane Telegraph, 6 Feb 1956). The site of the Boondall Drive-In has now been developed into housing.

The Burleigh Heads Drive-in was one of Queensland's first drive-ins when it opened in 1957 with a 500-car capacity. It was followed by the Starlight drive-in at Aspley, which was opened in January 1957 (at a cost of £100,000). Fourth to open, in April 1957, was Hoyts Skyline Drive-in located at Coopers Plains at a cost of £200,000. It could hold 650 cars on its 17 acres and also had a children's railway line, putt putt, badminton facilities and a dance floor.

The Starline Drive-In opened near Ipswich in the early 1960s. Other drive-ins opened in and around Brisbane in the late 1960s, and early 1970s. These included the Keperra, the Western at Oxley, the Galaxy at Cannon Hill and the Redcliffe Drive-In on the city's northern outskirts.

In 2002 a small boutique drive-in was opened in Wonga (north of Gympie), with a second screen added in 2004, increasing it to a 250 car capacity. A third screen was subsequently added; however, in January 2010 the drive-in closed, when its owner went into receivership. In September 2010 a new owner took over the operation of the drive-in, reopening in December that year. The drive-in has recently closed.

- Ayr Stardust Drive In, Ayr

The Stardust drive-in was opened in September 1964, with a capacity of 360 cars. Built within the grounds is a hardtop cinema, so patrons can choose between outdoor and indoor movies.

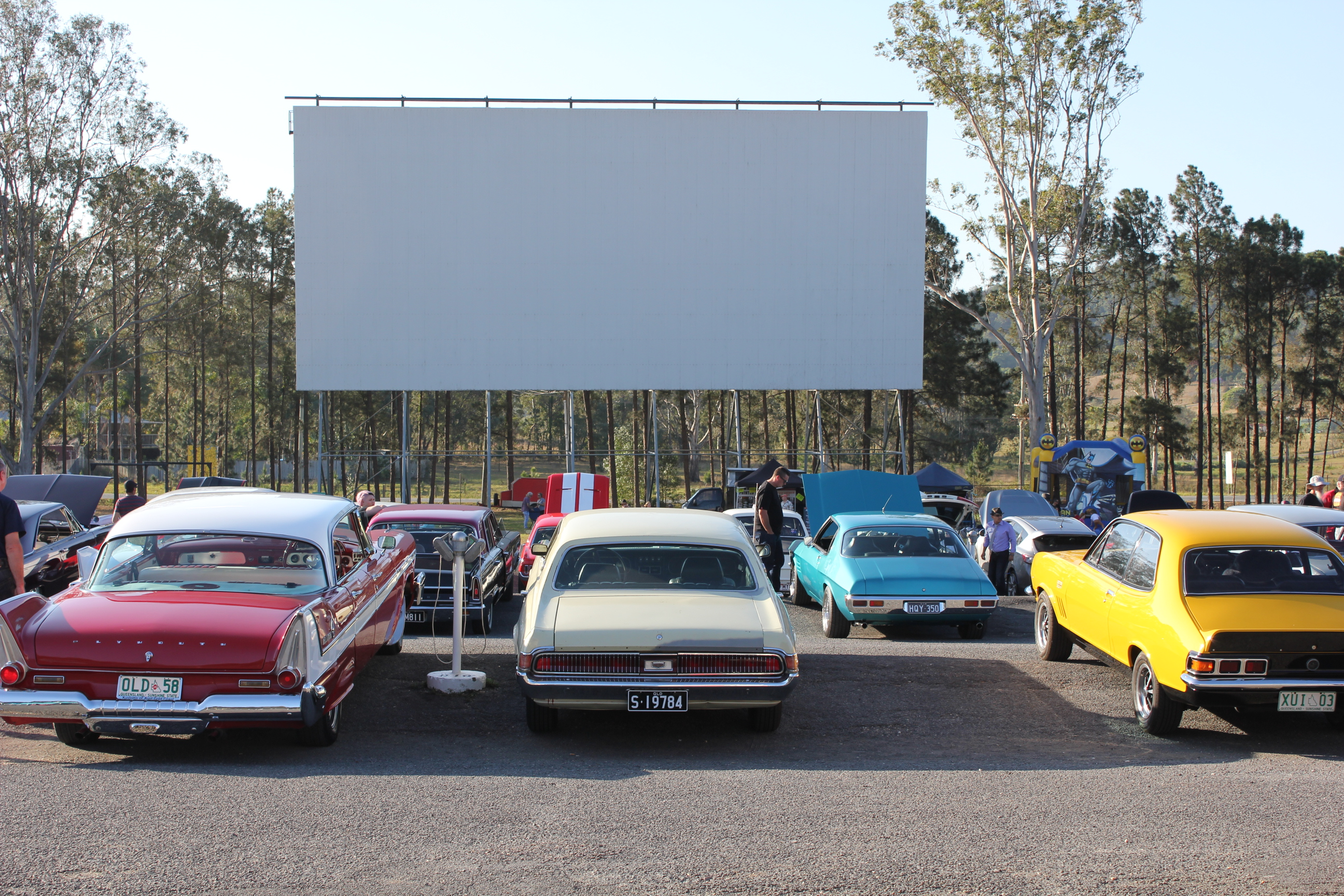
Yatala Drive-In during a themed event in 2013

- Charters Towers Tors Drive-In, 110–120 New Queen Road, Queenton, Charters Towers (20.0650°S 146.2907°E).

The Charters Towers Tors drive-in was opened in 1966 and has two screens with capacity for 300 cars.

- Jericho Drive in, Jericho

The Jericho drive-in is the smallest public drive-in located in Australia, and possibly the world, with a capacity for 36 cars. It was opened in 1969. Movies are screened once a month.

- Rodeo Drive In Mareeba, Mareeba

The Mareeba Rodeo drive-in was built by Far Northern Theatres in the 1960s. Far Northern Theatres had a circuit that extended right through far northern Queensland and into Papua New Guinea. The circuit was sold to Birch Carrol & Coyle in the 1970s. In the mid-1980s, Birch Carrol & Coyle pulled out and the Rodeo was sold to Norm Janke. Janke operated the drive-in until 1998 when it closed. It subsequently re-opened in 2002, with a 300 car capacity.

- Tivoli Drive In Theatre, Chuwar

The Tivoli Drive In Theatre first opened its gates in 1976 and operated for many years before closing in March 2000. The property was purchased by Rivers of Life Christian Church in 2003 and rebranded as the Tivoli Miracle Centre. In 2008 the church revived the Tivoli Drive In as a weekly community Drive-In theatre focused on providing families with low-cost family-oriented entertainment, and providing employment and work skills training opportunities for unemployed young adults and youth. The Drive-In screened movies every Saturday night. In November 2025, Tivoli Drive-In announced its closure due to declining attendance numbers and increasing operating costs.

- Yatala Drive-In (3 screens), Yatala

The Yatala Drive-In on the Gold Coast's last open-air drive-in theatre (in an area which formerly had over 20 drive-in theatres), formerly Beenleigh Drive-In, it opened on 27 October 1974, and in 2000 the theatre was renamed Yatala Twin Drive-In when a second screen was added. A third screen was added in 2013.

=== South Australia ===
The Blue-Line drive-in located in West Beach, Adelaide was the first drive-in located in South Australia, and the first to be constructed outside of Melbourne. It was opened on 28 December 1954 and was followed by the Mainline Drive-In theatre at Gepps Cross on 7 October 1955, which was Australia's first drive-in / walk-in theatre (with a capacity for 500 cars and seating for 400 patrons). It was followed by the Shandon in Seaton in early July 1956, the Hi-Line in Panorama in March 1957, and the MGM Metro at Marion in June 1957. The first country drive-in opened at Port Pirie in September 1957.

Following the closure of the Valleyline at Modbury in May 2003, only the Wallis Mainline Drive-in at Gepps Cross remained as the only remaining drive-in located in metropolitan Adelaide. In November 2021, Wallis announced the closure of Mainline at the end of February 2022, leaving Adelaide with no more drive-in theatres. Its reasons for closure were cited as "the changing nature of the cinema industry, the introduction of daylight saving, film piracy and now the lengthy COVID-19 epidemic".

In the country areas, the Riverview at Murray Bridge closed in February 2005 (after 46 years) and the Riverland in Barmera closed in September 2008.

The closure of the Mainline at Gepps Cross in February 2022 left the community-run facility at Coober Pedy as the state's last drive-in theatre. The Coober Pedy drive-in opened in 1965, but became less popular after 1980 with the arrival of television in the town, and ceased regular operation in 1984. It was reopened in 1996 and was operated by volunteers from 2000. Due to the opal miners often carrying explosives in their vehicles, the drive-in has a ban on bringing explosives onto the site. On 15 November 2023, winds reaching almost 120 kilometres per hour (75 mph) destroyed the screen, resulting in the drive-in's closure, but local volunteers hope they will be able to rebuild the screen and re-open the drive-in.

Over the years, the list of drive-ins in metropolitan Adelaide included:

- Ocean Line Drive-In Theatre - Dyson Road, Christie Downs
- Star Line Drive In Elizabeth - Main North Road, Hillbank
- Mainline Drive-In Theatre - Gawler Road, Gepps Cross
- Star Line Drive In Gilles Plains - Blacks Road, Gilles Plains
- Star Line Drive In Hectorville - Glynburn Road, Hectorville
- Metro Drive-In Theatre Marion - Oaklands Road, Marion
- Park Line Drive-In Theatre - Marion Road, Mitchell Park
- Valley Line Drive-In Theatre - Tolley Road, Modbury
- Star Line Drive In O'Halloran Hill - Majors Road, Darlington
- Harbour Line Drive-In Theatre - Victoria Road, Osborne
- Hi-Line Drive-In Theatre - Goodwood Road, Panorama
- Hollywood Drive-In Theatre - Winzor Street, Salisbury Downs
- Star Line Drive In Seaton - Tapleys Hill Road, Seaton
- Blue Line Drive In Theatres - Military Road, West Beach
- Star Line Drive In Woodville North - Grand Junction Road, Mansfield Park

=== Victoria ===
Lunar Drive-in Theatre Dandenong

Following a visit to the United States in the early 1950s, Hoyts' southern division manager, George Griffith Jr., believed that drive-in theatres would be successful in Australia. Hoyts and Fox, however, did not share Griffith's enthusiasm for the establishment of a drive-in theatre, so Griffith subsequently formed a syndicate, Auto Theatres, which decided on a site in the Melbourne suburb of Burwood for Australia's first drive-in theatre. Construction proceeded through the latter half of 1953 from plans drawn up by AC Leith Bartlett & Partners in conjunction with RCA Australia. The Skyline Burwood officially opened on 18 February 1954 and proved extremely popular, with traffic jams in both directions along the Burwood Highway. Hoyts subsequently bought out Griffith and his partners.

Following the success of the first drive-in theatre, the Skyline (Burwood), Hoyts quickly opened Skyline drive-in theatres at Preston in 1954, and Oakleigh in March 1955. In Wodonga, the Skyline Drive-in, located on the southwest corner of the Hume Highway and Melrose Drive, opened in November 1956. The next Hoyts drive-in was constructed in Broadmeadows (1958), but then there was a break of almost 10 years until Hoyts acquired drive-ins at Coburg and Oakleigh and constructed new drive-ins in Bulleen (1965), Wantirna (1968) and Altona. In 1972 the Broadmeadows Skyline was the first of the Melbourne suburban drive-ins to close, whilst the Oakleigh site was the last drive-in operated by Hoyts in the world, when it closed in 1990.

Sandringham drive-in theatre (now closed) was located between Tulip and Talinga Roads in Sandringham. With the entrance being on Tulip St.

Today Melburnians have 10 screens in their immediate vicinity to choose from (counting Dromana as being basically suburban Melbourne). Rural Victorians, however, have none.

The Lunar Dandenong opened on 4 May 1956 and was constructed by J. and K. Houlahan from plans drawn up by Baily and Tilley. The original capacity was to be for 400 cars; however, this was redesigned to accommodate 600 cars, with the final capacity being 634 cars. The drive-in closed on 18 April 1984 and was subsequently purchased by Trash and Treasure Australia Pty Ltd, who operated a Sunday market on the site in the 1970s. On 19 September 2002 it reopened as a two-screen drive-in, with a third screen added in September 2003 with a 950-car capacity. It closed in late 2023.

Coburg Drive-In opened in November 1965, under the ownership of Sillman and Sharp and is still in operation today. It was acquired by Hoyts in 1967 and briefly closed for several years beginning in 1984. Hoyts was unable to sell the site despite numerous attempts, and in 1987, Village joined with Hoyts and re-opened Coburg as a twin screen in 1987. A third screen was added in 1995. Coburg was Australia's largest drive-in theatre with an 850-car capacity, until the expansion at Dandenong in 2003.

The Dromana Drive-In was opened in 1961 with a capacity of 485 cars. It has since been expanded to a three screen operation and has a Sunday market operating from the site. It is only one of three that have never closed (since the 1960s), operating continuously since its inception (1961) to the present.

=== Western Australia ===
The first conventional drive-in located in Western Australia was the Highway, opened in the Perth suburb of Bentley on 24 October 1955, with the screening of Cecil B. DeMille's The Greatest Show on Earth. The Highway, owned and operated by John Pye (who founded the Ace entertainment and hospitality group), was located on a 6 ha (15 acres) former dairy farm, fronting Albany Highway. It featured a 13 m (43 ft) high by 15 m (49 ft) wide screen on 240 t (260 tons) concrete footings, with a 642 car capacity, children's playground, mini golf course, cafeteria and approximately 30 staff. The resultant success of the Highway started a boom in suburban drive-ins which saw a further eight operating by the end of the decade (the Skyline in Floreat in November 1955, Mott's in Gosnells in January 1956, the Panorama in Roleystone in March 1956, the Metro in Innaloo, the Lakeway in Swanbourne in April 1957, the Melway in Melville, the Wirrina in Morley in March 1959 and the Eastway in Belmont in July 1959), with another nine sites opening in the 1960s (including the Starline in Hilton). The growth of Perth's suburban drive-ins then slowed to only five more built during the 1970s, with the last drive-in theatre, Aceway, in the suburb of Morley, constructed in 1980.

In the country areas, the first to open was the Oasis in Geraldton in 1957, and there were only three more built in the 1950s; the Mayfair in Bunbury, the Avonway in Northam and the Morcady in Wongan Hills. The boom years in the country were the sixties, which saw 61 drive-ins opened, with growth then slowing to only six more built in the seventies and one in the eighties.

By the 1990s there were only three suburban drive-ins that remained, but then the Metro (a twin screen site as of 1984) in Innaloo closed in 1993 followed by the Highway (a twin screen site as of 1986) in Bentley which closed on 19 June 1994; only the Galaxy (established 1 November 1973) in Kingsley remains open within the Perth surrounds. There are however a few drive-in theatres and car-friendly outdoor cinemas still operating in rural Western Australia. The Dongara Drive-in, built in 1966 and opened in January 1967, has been in continual operation since this time. After a storm in 2008 the screen was replaced and the original projector upgraded. In 2015 the projector was upgraded to digital. The drive-in can accommodate 200 cars; whilst it only operates in summer, it is the longest continually running drive-in in Western Australia. The Koorda Community Drive-in opened in October 1965; it closed in 1983 but reopened in 1987. It has a capacity of 110 cars, has been updated to digital, and screens monthly.

=== Tasmania ===
The state capital Hobart previously had two drive-in theatres, one on each side of the Derwent River. Opening in 1956, the Elwick Drive-In at Elwick was the first drive-in theatre in Tasmania. The Eastside Drive-In at Warrane was reportedly the largest screen in Australia upon opening in 1966, measuring 330 square metres (3,600 sq ft) in size and hosting 418 cars.

Launceston's Village Drive-In at Mowbray opened on 10 October 1957. The screen measured 29 by 12 metres (96 ft × 40 ft) with space for 877 cars, making it the largest in Tasmania by capacity. Drive-in theatres at Devonport and Burnie both opened in 1958.

The last of Tasmania's drive-in theatres at Elwick and Mowbray were closed by Village Cinemas in March 1985.

There are no current permanent drive-ins in Tasmania; however, drive-in events have been hosted at the Royal Hobart Regatta Grounds at Queens Domain as part of the City of Hobart's Out in the Open program, as well as special drive-in events facilitated throughout Tasmania by Tassie Open Air Cinemas. Launceston's Harvest Market secured funding to support drive-in events in 2020.

== See also ==
- Drive-in theater#Australia
- List of drive-in theatres
