= Drive-in theater =

Cinema format

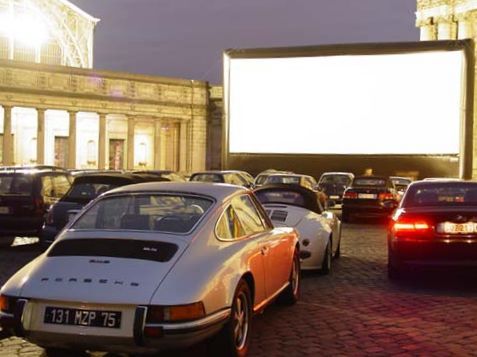
A drive-in with an inflatable movie screen in Brussels, Belgium

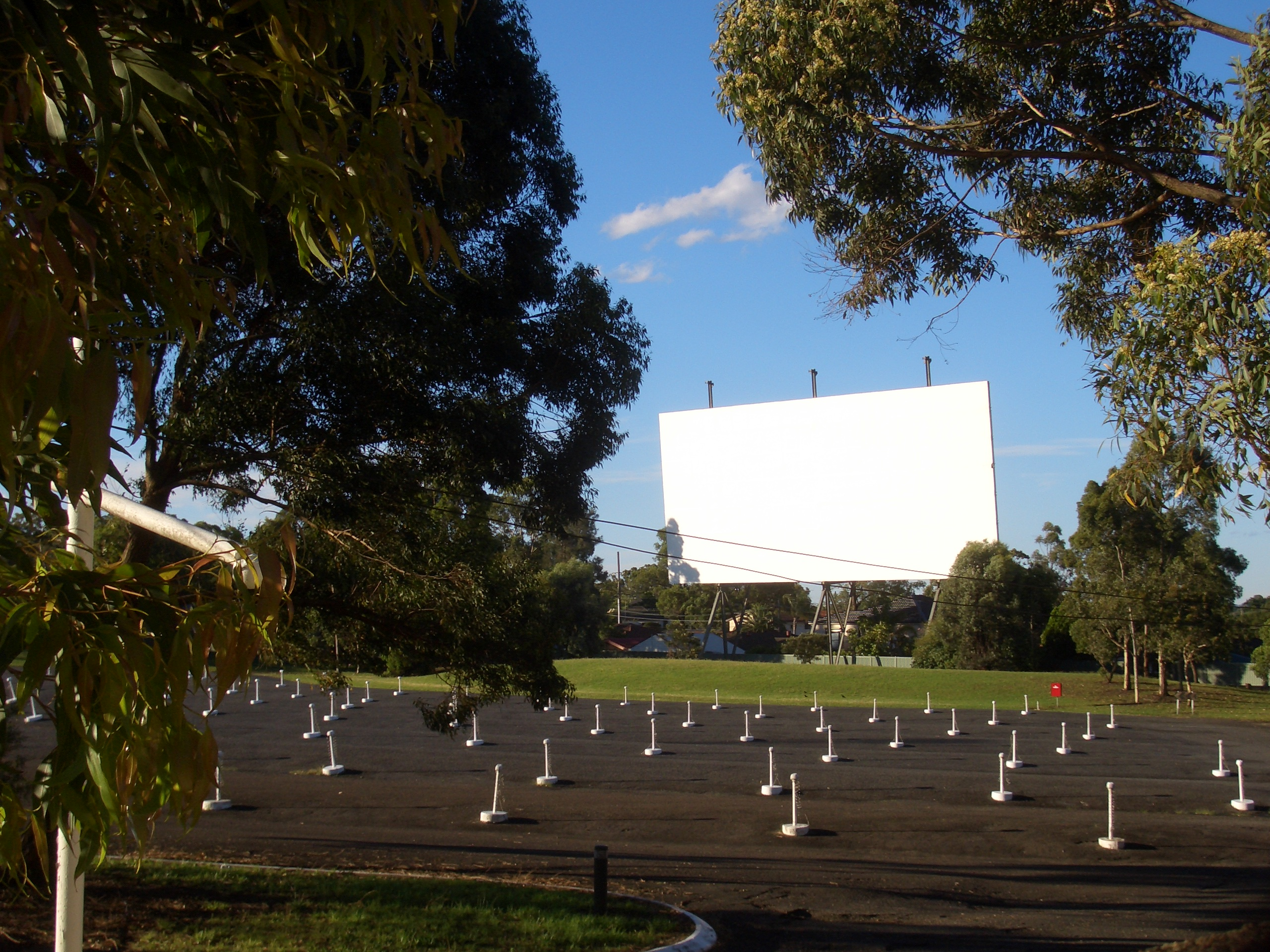
Bass Hill drive-in cinema, Sydney

A drive-in theater/theatre or drive-in cinema is a form of cinema structure consisting of a large outdoor movie screen, a projection booth, a concession stand, and a large parking area for automobiles. Within this enclosed area, customers can view movies from the privacy and comfort of their cars. Some drive-ins have small playgrounds for children and a few picnic tables or benches.

The screen can be as simple as a painted white wall, or it can be a steel truss structure with a complex finish. Originally, the movie's sound was provided by speakers on the screen and later by individual speakers hung from the window of each car, which was attached to a small pole by a wire. These speaker systems were superseded by the more practical method of microbroadcasting the soundtrack to car radios. This also has two advantages: 1. the film soundtrack to be heard in stereo on car stereo systems, which are typically of much higher quality and fidelity than the basic small mono speakers used in the old systems. 2. Drivers would frequently forget the speaker was attached to their window and would drive off, breaking the cable connecting the speaker to the sound system, the driver's side window, or even pulling the entire pole connected to the speaker out of the ground.

== History ==
=== Early drive-ins (before WWII) ===
A partial drive-in theater—Theatre de Guadalupe—was opened in Las Cruces, New Mexico on April 23, 1915:

Seven hundred people may be comfortably seated in the auditorium. Automobile entrances and places for 40 or more cars within the theater grounds and in-line position to see the pictures and witness all performances on the stage is a feature of the place that will please car owners.

The first movie shown by the Theatre de Guadalupe was Bags of Gold, produced by Siegmund Lubin. Theatre de Guadalupe was soon renamed De Lux Theater before closing in July 1916.

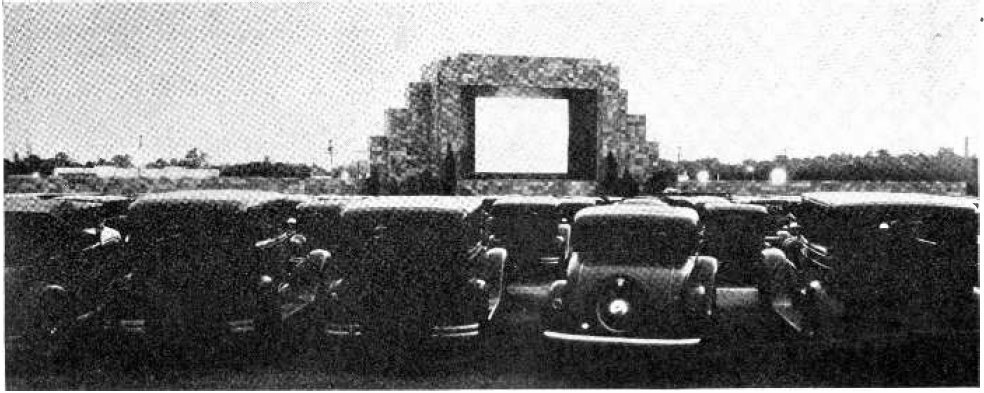
First drive-in theater, Pennsauken, New Jersey, 1933

In 1921, a drive-in was opened by Claude V. Caver in Comanche, Texas. Caver obtained a permit from the city to project films downtown. With cars parked bumper-to-bumper, patrons witnessed the screening of silent films from their vehicles. In the 1920s "outdoor movies" became a popular summer entertainment, but relatively few "drive-in" experiments were made due to logistical difficulties.

The drive-in theater was patented in Camden, New Jersey, by chemical company magnate Richard M. Hollingshead Jr., whose family owned and operated the R.M. Hollingshead Corporation chemical plant in Camden. In 1932, Hollingshead conducted outdoor theater tests in his driveway at 212 Thomas Avenue in Riverton. After nailing a screen to trees in his backyard, he set a 1928 Kodak projector on the hood of his car and put a radio behind the screen, testing different sound levels with his car windows down and up. Blocks under vehicles in the driveway enabled him to determine the size and spacing of ramps so all automobiles could view the screen. Hollingshead applied for a patent of his invention on August 6, 1932, and he was given U.S. patent 1,909,537 on May 16, 1933.

Hollingshead's drive-in opened in New Jersey on June 6, 1933, at 2901 Admiral Wilson Boulevard in Pennsauken Township, a short distance from Cooper River Park where the first commercial airport to serve Philadelphia was located – Camden Central Airport. Rosemont Avenue now runs through where the theater was and is currently the site of Zinman Furs. It offered 400 slots and a 40 by 50 ft (12 by 15 m) screen. He advertised his drive-in theater with the slogan, "The whole family is welcome, regardless of how noisy the children are." The first film shown was the Adolphe Menjou film Wives Beware. Failing to make a profit, Hollingshead sold the theater after three years to a Union, New Jersey, theater owner who moved the infrastructure to that city, but the concept caught on nationwide.

The April 15, 1934, opening of Shankweiler's Auto Park in Orefield, Pennsylvania, was followed by Galveston's Drive-In Short Reel Theater (July 5, 1934), the Pico Drive-In Theater at Pico and Westwood boulevards in Los Angeles (September 9, 1934) and the Weymouth Drive-In Theatre in Weymouth, Massachusetts (May 6, 1936). In 1937, three more opened in Ohio, Massachusetts and Rhode Island, with another 12 during 1938 and 1939 in California, Florida, Maine, Maryland, Massachusetts, Michigan, New York, Texas and Virginia.

Early drive-in theaters had to deal with sound issues. The original Hollingshead drive-in had speakers installed on the tower itself, which caused a sound delay affecting patrons at the rear of the drive-in's field. In 1935, the Pico Drive-in Theater attempted to solve this problem by having a row of speakers in front of the cars. In 1941, RCA introduced in-car speakers with individual volume controls which solved the noise pollution issue and provided satisfactory sound to drive-in patrons. Just before World War II, 9 of the 15 drive-in movie theaters open in the United States were operated by Philip Smith, who promoted a family-friendly environment by allowing children to enter free and built playgrounds.

=== Peak (late 1940s–1960s) ===
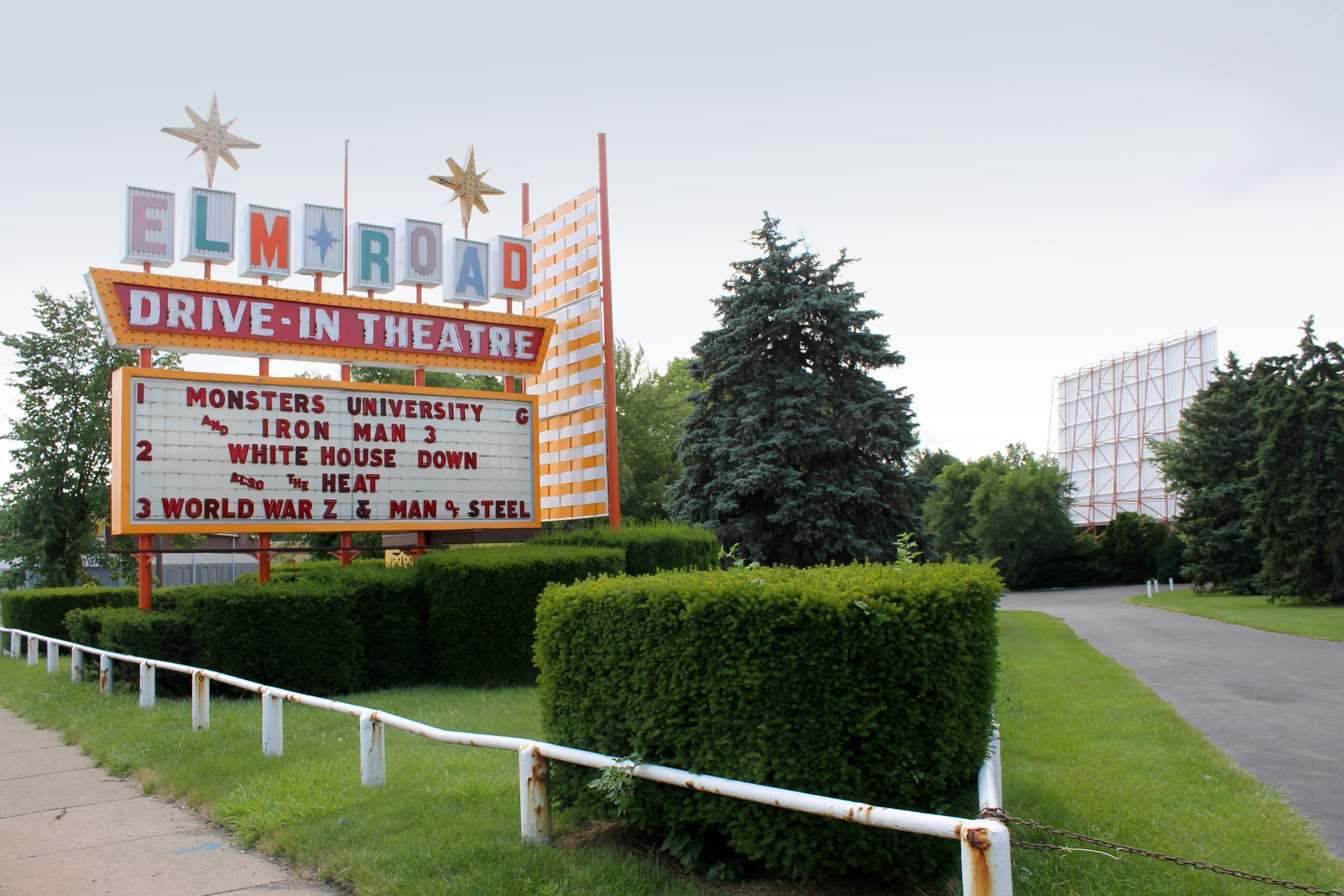
Classic googie architecture at this Ohio drive-in

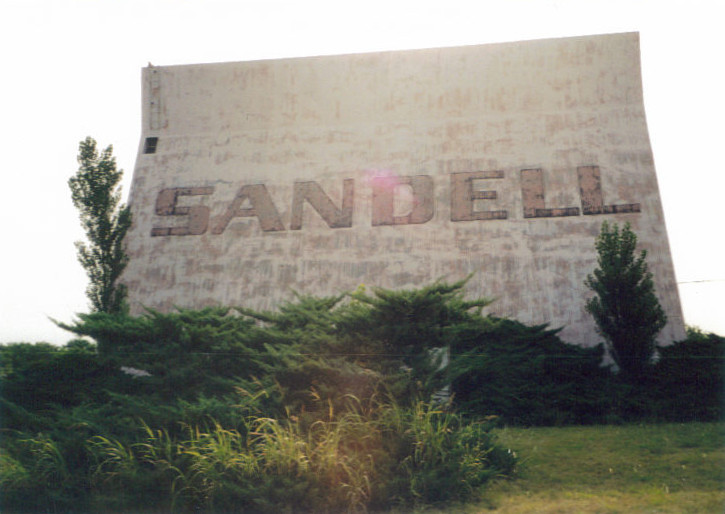
The Sandell Theater (pictured in 2000) off Texas State Highway 70, was a reminder of by-gone days, having closed in 1984. The theater reopened in 2002 in Clarendon, Texas.

After 1945, rising car ownership and suburban and rural population led to a boom in drive-in theaters, with hundreds being opened each year. More couples were reunited and having children, resulting in the Baby boom, and more cars were being purchased following the end of wartime fuel rationing. By 1951, the number of drive-in movie theaters in the United States had increased from its 1947 total of 155 to 4,151.

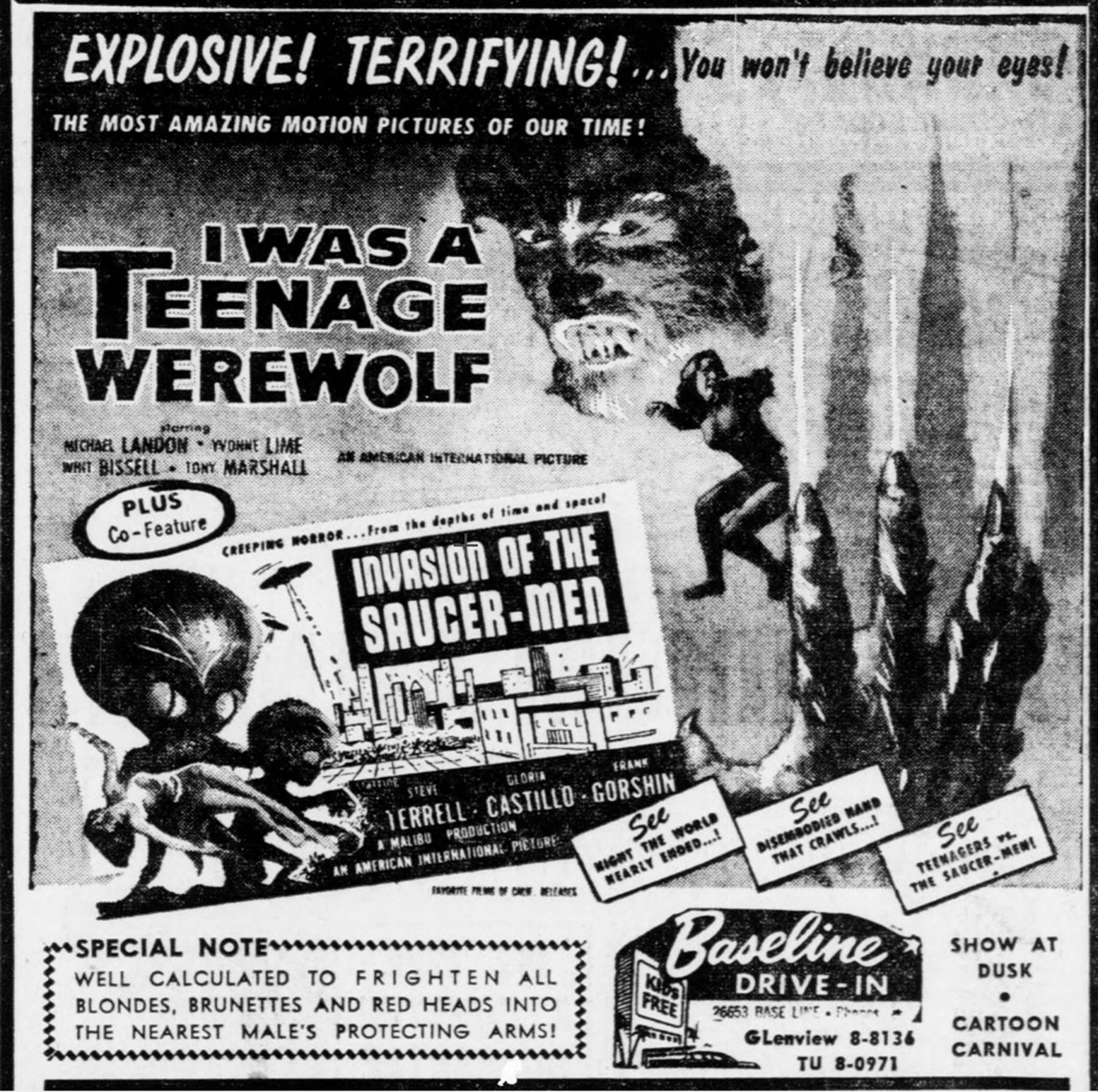
Drive-in advertisement from 1957 for a double feature of I Was a Teenage Werewolf and Invasion of the Saucer Men. Horror and sci-fi were popular on the drive-in circuit, and specifically aimed at teens.

The drive-in's peak popularity came in the late 1950s and early 1960s, particularly in rural areas, with over 4,000 drive-ins spread across the United States in 1958. They were a cheaper alternative to in-door cinema theaters because not only did they save the gas of driving out to the city and then back home, but the cost of building and maintaining a drive-in theater was cheaper than that of an indoor theater, resulting in the lower overall cost of attendance. Among its advantages was the fact that older adults with children could take care of their infant while watching a movie. At the same time, youth found drive-ins ideal for a first date. Unlike indoor cinema theaters, there was an air of informality that was appealing to people of all ages, but specifically to families. The drive-in's success was rooted in its reputation of being a family-friendly place. Parents were able to bring their children to the theater, often in pajamas, without worrying about bothering other movie-goers and were also able to spend time together without paying the expenses of babysitters. Drive-ins catered to their known audience, offering luxuries such as bottle warmers and diaper vending machines, and later miniature golf courses, swimming pools, and even motels on the land with windows facing the screens so that viewers could watch the films from their beds. During the 1950s, the greater privacy afforded to patrons gave drive-ins a reputation as immoral, and they were labeled "passion pits" in the media. The 1978 movie Grease portrays the local drive-in as a preferred spot for trysts. This indicates that the drive-in theater experience was a part of North American pop culture during this time, coupled with people's love for cars and movies. It was also popular among young people to meet up and have sex, smoke marijuana and drink alcohol. It was appealing to young people as it allowed them to express freedom and liberty they would otherwise lack at home.

At their height, some drive-ins used attention-grabbing gimmicks to boost attendance. They ranged from drawings for prizes and free admission, small airplane runways, helicopter or hot air balloon rides, unusual attractions such as a small petting zoo or cage of monkeys, personal appearances by actors to open their movies, or musical groups to play before the show. Some drive-ins held Sunday religious services or charged a flat price per car on slow nights like Wednesdays or Sundays. On "buck" or "bargain" nights during the 1950s and 1960s, the admission price was one dollar per car; during the 1970s and '80s, bargain night admission was generally five dollars.

As revenue was more limited than regular theaters since showings could only begin at twilight, there were abortive attempts to create suitable conditions for daylight viewing, such as large tent structures, but nothing viable was developed.

A snack bar ad shown at a drive-in

One of the largest drive-in theaters was the Johnny All-Weather Drive-In in Copiague, New York. Covering over 29 acres, it could park 2,500 vehicles. It had a full-service restaurant with seating on the roof and a trolley system to take children and adults to a playground and a large indoor theater for bad weather or for those who wanted to watch in air-conditioned comfort. The largest in the world was Loew's Open Air in Lynn, Massachusetts which could hold 5,000 cars.

On June 3, 1948, Edward Brown opened a "fly-in, drive-in" theater, advertised as the first in the world, beside his Monmouth County Airport (now Monmouth Executive Airport) in Wall Township, New Jersey. It had room for more than 500 cars and 20 airplanes; pilots landed at the airport and taxied to a ramp behind the cars, where a jeep towed each airplane to a stand fitted with its own speaker.

=== Decline (1970s–1990s) ===
Several factors contributed to the decline of the drive-in movie industry. Beginning in the late 1960s, drive-in attendance began to decline as the result of improvements and changes to home entertainment, from color television and cable TV to VCRs and video rental in the early 1980s. Additionally, the 1970s energy crisis led to the widespread adoption of daylight saving time (which caused drive-in movies to start an hour later) and lower use of automobiles, making it increasingly difficult for drive-ins to remain profitable.

Mainly following the advent of cable television and video cassette recorder (VCR), then with the arrival of DVD and streaming systems, families were able to enjoy movies in the comfort of their homes. The new entertainment technology increased the options and the movie watching experience.

While exploitation films had been a drive-in staple since the 1950s, helped by relatively limited oversight compared to downtown theaters, by the 1970s, several venues switched from showing family-friendly fare to R-rated and X-rated films as a way to offset declining patronage and revenue, while other venues that still catered to families, began to show R-rated or pornographic movies in late-night time slots to bring in extra income. This allowed censored materials to be viewed by a wider audience, including those for whom viewing was still illegal in some states, and it was also reliant upon varying local ordinances controlling such material. It also required a relatively remote location away from the heavier populated areas of towns and cities.

By the late 1970s, many drive-in theaters were showing mainly B movies, older second-run films and low-rated films from the movie industry. While movie rental fees were increasing, the film industry was also expecting drive-in theaters to maintain prolonged time to run the shows. A combination of these factors was creating difficulties for the drive-ins to compete with the growing indoor cinemas.

The runaway inflation and real estate interest rate hikes in the late 1970s and early 1980s made the large tracts of land used by drive-ins increasingly expensive and thus far too valuable for continued use as drive-ins. Many drive-ins operated solely on weekends, while some were open only during the spring and summer months; drive-ins were also frequently subject to poor attendance or cancellations due to adverse weather. By the late 1980s, the total number of drive-ins still operating in the United States and Canada fell to less than two hundred.

In addition to the large amount of land drive-in theaters occupy, older drive-ins were now showing their age and many required improvements or replacement of their infrastructure; many owners were not willing to make further investment in repairs and improvements and growing land prices were also making it difficult to invest in and maintain the expense of operating a drive-in theater business. As many of the drive-in theaters were set up in the outskirts, the expansion of towns was making the maintenance of large property more difficult and costly.

Many former drive-in movie sites remain, with several re-purposed as storage or flea market sites, often after residential housing or other higher-value uses came to rural or sparsely populated areas where the drive-ins were located. In Michigan, former drive-in properties have become industrial parks, shopping centers, indoor theaters, and even churches (as with the Former Woodland Drive-In in Grand Rapids, MI). In Philadelphia, the South City Drive-In became the location of the original Spectrum in the late 1960s, with a small portion of its old property line extending into what would become the (now-demolished) Veterans Stadium complex. (Today, that small portion, combined with the original Spectrum location, is part of Stateside Live!). Another example of a drive in-turned-flea market is Spotlight 88 in North Sewickley Township, Pennsylvania, which ended business as a drive-in after an F3 tornado destroyed much of the property on May 31, 1985. As a joke, after the tornado hit, the owners put up the "now-showing" sign Gone with the Wind. It was most likely copied from a Taylor, Michigan Drive in called Ecorse Drive-In. On July 16, 1980, a freak derecho storm with 150 mph straight-line winds swept the Drive-In away leaving only the "now-showing" sign with the letters "Now Playing Gone with the Wind". The screen was rebuilt, but the business never recovered; by 1989, it was sold and now is the site of a Kroger grocery store.

=== Revival and new drive-in formats (late 1990s–2000s) ===
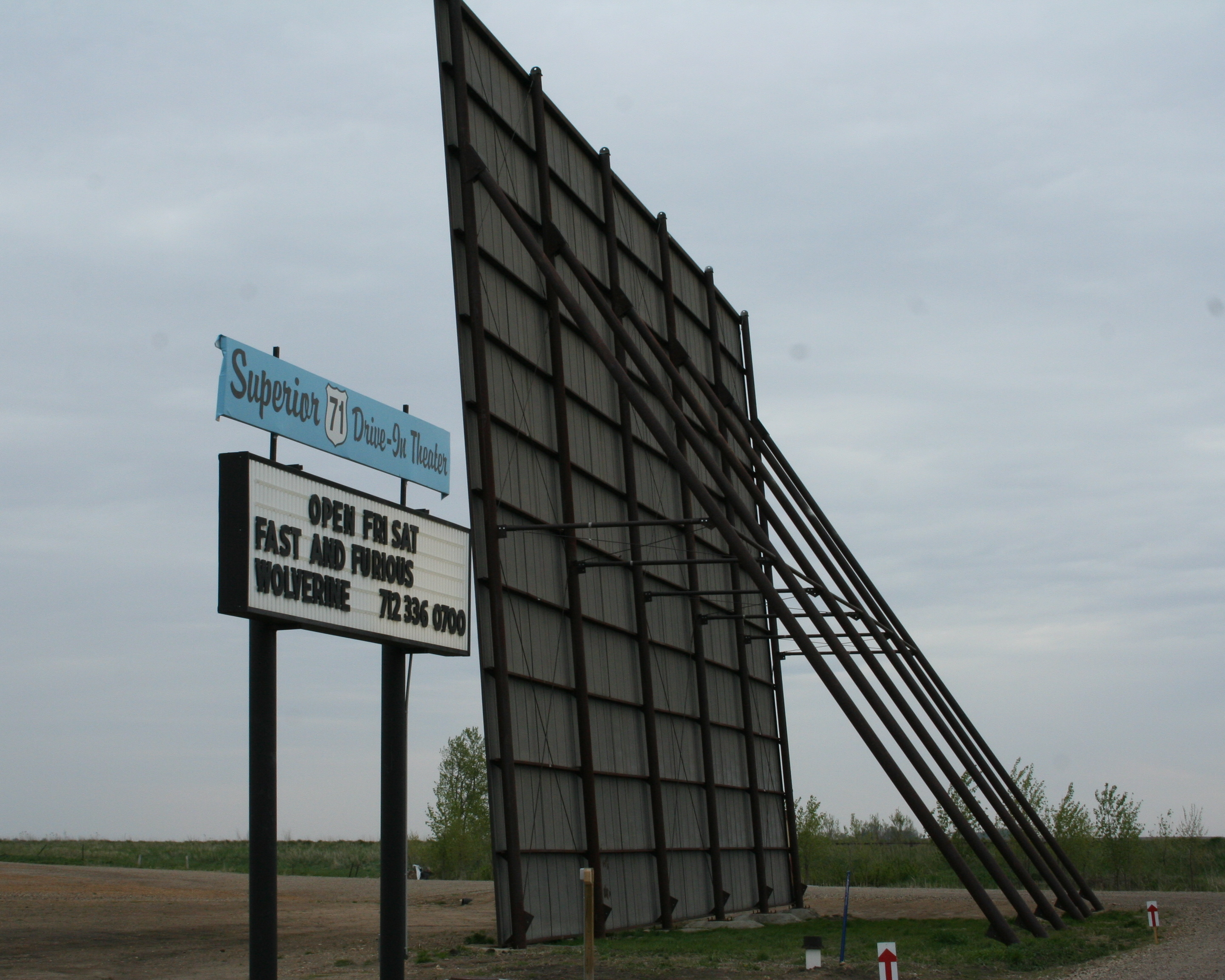
A newly built drive-in screen near Superior, Iowa, 2009

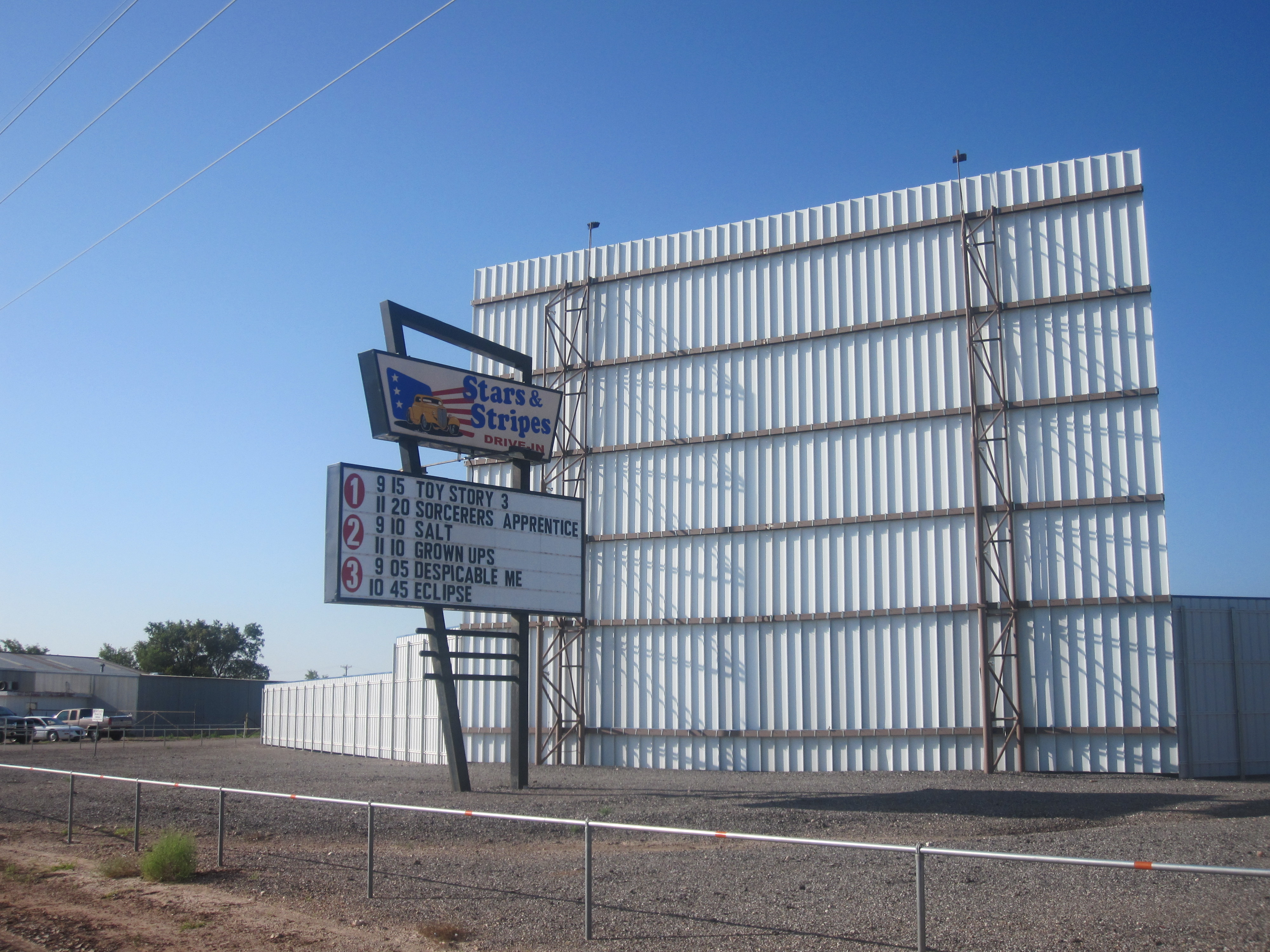
Stars & Stripes Drive-in at 5101 Highway 84 West in Lubbock, Texas, 2010

Beginning in the late 1970s and extending through the mid-1990s, those drive-ins still operating acquired a quasi-novelty status, catering to the wave of "boomer nostalgia" and loyal patrons. This "retro" appeal eventually led to a revival of sorts by the end of the 1990s.

This resurgence of the drive-in industry led to the inception of the "do-it-yourself" drive-in beginning in 2001, which used contemporary tools such as LCD projectors and micro radio transmitters. The first was the Liberation Drive-In in Oakland, California, which sought to reclaim under-used urban spaces such as vacant parking lots in the downtown area. The following years have had a rise of the "guerrilla drive-in" movement, in which groups of dedicated individuals orchestrate similar outdoor film and video screenings. Showings are often organized online, and participants meet at specified locations to watch films projected on bridge pillars or warehouses. The content featured at these screenings has frequently been independent or experimental films, cult movies, or otherwise alternative programming. Aside from Oakland's Liberation, the best-known "guerrilla" drive-ins include the Santa Cruz Guerilla Drive-In in Santa Cruz, California, North Bay Mobile Drive-In in Novato, California, Mobmov in San Francisco, California and Hollywood, and more recently the Guerilla Drive-In Victoria in Victoria, British Columbia.

A similar, more recent concept is the "boutique" drive-in, which caters to a smaller audience, generally 30 to 50 vehicles (with some also offering seats in front of the screen). At the same time, food trucks are often used as concession stands. However, unlike the "guerrilla" format, this type of drive-in also generally presents mainstream fare, current releases, and popular classics. A key feature of this format is the focus on the "vintage" aesthetics of the drive-in.

Faced with the closure of Hull's Drive-In in Lexington, Virginia in 1999, the nonprofit group Hull's Angels formed to raise funds, buy the property, and operate the theater as a nonprofit venture specializing in family-friendly films. Hull's continues to be the nation's only nonprofit drive-in.

By 2006, around 500 drive-in theaters were open in the United States, counting regularly operating venues (about 400) and those that held showings sporadically, usually during summertime, the highest number since the mid-1970s. The industry also rebounded in Canada and Australia during the early 2000s.

=== Present and digital conversion (late 2000s onwards) ===
In the second half of the 2000s, drive-ins had another decline because of the oil crisis and a worsening economy. Reduced use of automobiles and more people moving out of suburban and rural areas during the 2010s have also put the drive-in's future at risk, with numbers again on the decline. By 2013, drive-ins comprised only 1.5% of total movie screens in the United States, with 389 theaters in operation nationwide, mostly located in the South and the West Coast (at the industry's height, about 25% of the nation's movie screens were at drive-ins). A figure of 348 operating drive-ins was published for the United States in March 2014.

In 2010, the Galaxy Drive-In Movie Theater in Ennis, Texas became the world's first drive-in theater to show 3D films.

In the fall of 2014, retro-themed burger chain Johnny Rockets announced that it would team up with USA Drive-Ins to open 200 drive-ins by 2018, serving Johnny Rocket's food at the concession stands, but the plan never came to fruition, as did a proposed "Project Drive-In" scheme by Honda, which would have donated digital projectors. By 2018, less than 300 drive-in theaters were reported to operate worldwide, with only a handful outside North America.

The ongoing conversion of film distribution from celluloid to digital also puts additional pressure on drive-in theaters. Most small drive-ins lack the finances (beginning at $70,000 per screen) needed to convert to digital projection. The low volume of ticket sales from the lack of multiple showings also makes justifying the cost of installing digital projection hard for many drive-ins. Conversion of the projection booth to digital is more complex for drive-in theaters. The projector needs a more powerful bulb due to increased screen size and light pollution. In addition, digital projection equipment may require an Internet connection, and the booth must be retrofitted with special glass, more vents, and stronger air conditioning, as well as heat in northern climates.

With installation of Jumbotrons or similar digital display equipment in drive-in theaters, restrictions of the projector booth can be avoided; that is, no projector is needed.

The move to digital conversion took its toll on the industry; by October 2019, figures for operating drive-in theaters rose to 305 because of increased numbers of smaller 'boutique' operations that had never used traditional projectors, while several older drive-ins have closed.

=== Current drive-in theater experience (since 2020) ===
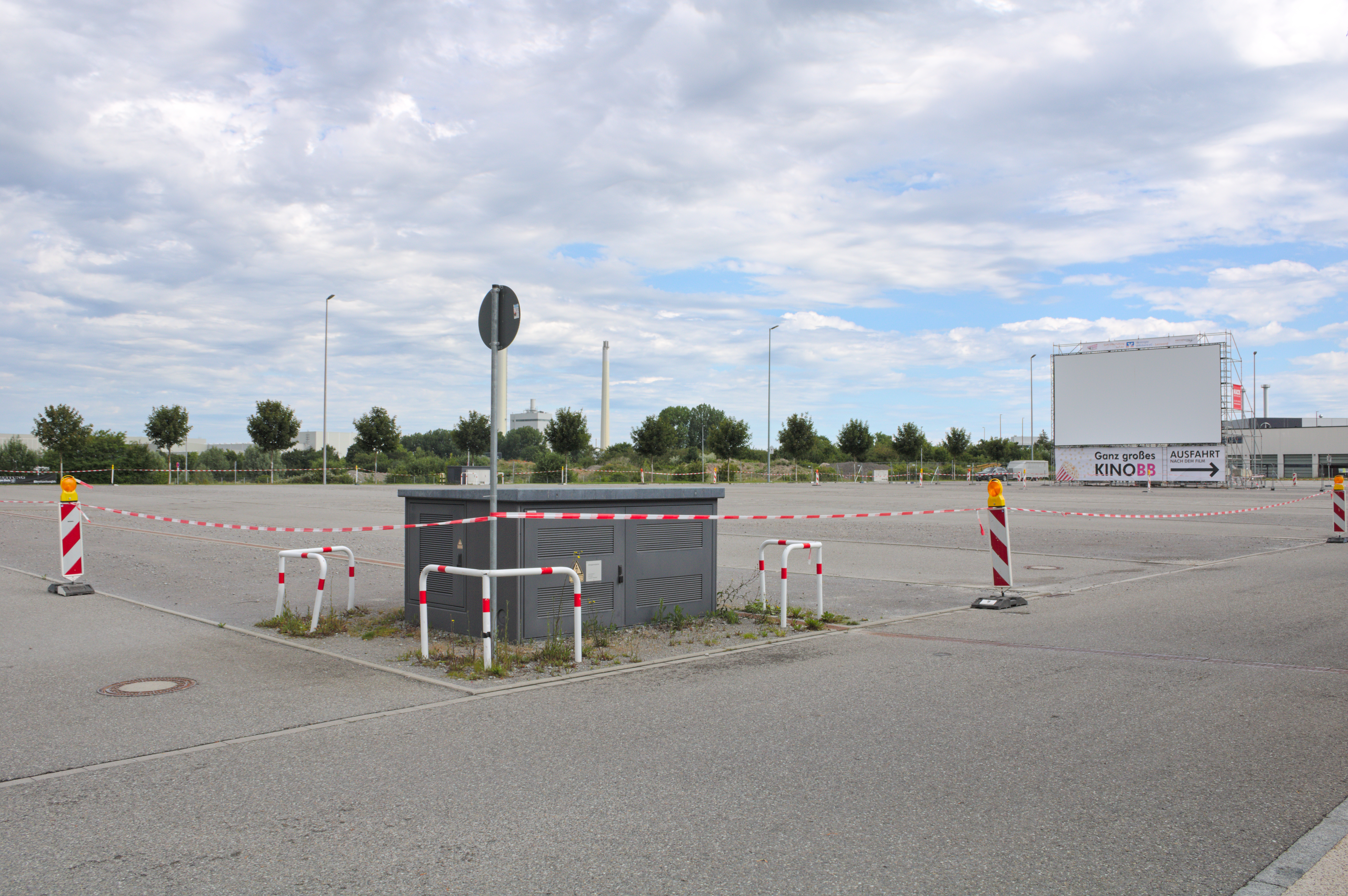
Temporary drive-in cinema in Böblingen, Germany

During the COVID-19 pandemic, drive-in theaters reported an unexpected surge in attendance in several U.S. states, as unlike with indoor theaters unable to operate because of bans on mass gatherings, these were allowed to operate, with such events as graduations, because people are automatically separated from each other by their cars, and usually enough space remains to walk around and still practice proper physical distancing.

The largest drive-in theater in the world, the Fort Lauderdale Swap Shop (opened 1963), doubles as the world's largest daily flea market.

There was some renewed interest in drive-in theaters among North American moviegoers at the outset of the 2020s. This trend was more apparent in 2020 through 2022. During the height of the COVID-19 pandemic, drive-ins accounted for an estimated 85 to 95 percent of North America's box office revenue according to a CNN report. The article also claims that the new experience in drive-in cinemas is gaining popularity not just in North America but in other countries as well.

After decades of decline, drive-in theaters re-emerged elsewhere. One of the countries where drive-in theaters is returning is the United Kingdom. In North America, several new drive-in venues have opened recently with long-term business goals and expansion plans. Some owners believe that drive-ins will help renew and modernize the outdoor movie experience.

Many of these new drive-in theaters feature updated designs that include electronic screen systems, allowing films to be shown during the day. These advancements improve both visual quality and convenience, removing the need to wait for darkness. Other improvements include upgraded concession areas and public facilities. One such example is LoCo Drive-In, a project by Whitener Company and London Entertainment LLC, which also plans to host additional social events such as car shows and community gatherings.

Another modern example is The Drive-In Experience Ottawa, which opened in 2020 and now operates two locations in the Ottawa area. Beyond movie nights, the drive-in hosts live entertainment such as comedy shows and concerts, and offers site rentals for events including graduations and weddings. The venue provides a large screen, wireless in-car FM transmission, and a stage for live performances. According to the company, this community-oriented model is designed to sustain the drive-in experience into the future.

The Ottawa Business Journal reports that local businesses and organizations can also rent the space to host private screenings and events. The venue can be used for activities such as yoga classes and fitness training. The director of The Drive-In Experience Ottawa stated that the goal is to help communities reconnect while hosting large-scale weekly entertainment for Ottawa residents.

This trend extends beyond Ottawa. According to CTV, several drive-ins in Ontario and other provinces have expanded their offerings to include live concerts and various entertainment options while continuing to focus on family-friendly movie experiences. In Nova Scotia and New Brunswick, some drive-ins also host religious events and other community activities.

== Drive-in theaters around the world ==
=== Australia ===
The drive-in theater also became popular in Australia during the 1950s and 1960s. The Hoyts Skyline in Melbourne was the country's first drive-in cinema, opening in 1954 with the film On the Riviera. The drive-in was successful, and four more opened within the year, including Mainline Drive-In in Gepps Cross, South Australia. The number of drive-ins increased across the country in the ensuing years. As these drive-ins were based on the American trend, many served American-style food at snack bars. At the height of their popularity in the mid-1960s, around 330 drive-in theaters were operating in Australia before quickly dropping off. As of May 2023, there were only 12 drive-ins in regular operation, with three more which sometimes opened for film screenings. Gepps Cross Drive-In closed at the end of February 2022, with the lengthy COVID-19 pandemic finally putting an end to its viability. As of May 2023, only 12 drive-in cinemas operate regularly, while an additional three sometimes open to screen films.

Melbourne's largest drive-in, the Lunar in Dandenong South, closed in July 2023. Queensland's Tivoli Drive-In, located in Chuwar, announced its closure in November 2025, citing rising maintenance costs, competition with streaming platforms and dwindling attendance.

The world's most remote drive-in may be at Coober Pedy, South Australia. It opened in 1965, but became less popular after 1980 with the arrival of television in the town, and ceased regular operation in 1984. It was reopened in 1996, and has been operated by volunteers since 2000. It is still in operation as of May 2023, and is the last drive-in theater in the state of South Australia (since February 2022). Due to the opal miners often carrying explosives in their vehicles, the drive-in has a ban on bringing explosives onto the site. On November 15, 2023, winds reaching almost 120 kilometres per hour (75 mph) destroyed the screen, resulting in the drive-in's closure, but local volunteers hope they will be able to rebuild the screen and re-open the drive-in.

=== Finland ===
There have been a few drive-in theaters in Finland, one of the first at the Keimola Motor Stadium in the late 1960s, while the latest in Kaarina in 2017, and in Turku and Vantaa in 2020.

=== Germany ===
Germany's first drive-in theater, the Gravenbruch, opened in April 1960 in a suburb of Frankfurt with a screening of The King and I. The only other drive-ins in Europe at the time were in Rome, Italy and Madrid, Spain.

=== Greece ===
In 1919, Athens, Greece opened their first outdoor theater that eventually led to the popularity of drive-in theaters in the 1970s. Three years before then, two men displayed a short silent film on a wall of the city. Greece's first drive-in theater began construction in 1960 near Varibobi, a suburb of Athens, and was planned to open in August 1961. Viewers today have the option to eat classic movie refreshments such as popcorn, or even native Greek snacks such as grilled calamari and souvlaki.

=== Iran ===
In 2020, Iran showed its first drive-in film, Exodus, during the COVID-19 pandemic. However the country previously operated one before 1979.

=== Italy ===
The first drive-in theater in Europe opened in Rome in 1954.

=== Philippines ===
The Philippines' shopping mall chain SM Supermalls opened the country's first drive-in theater near SM City Pampanga on July 31, 2020. It also opened a temporary drive-in cinema at the SM Mall of Asia concert grounds on September 9, 2020. Currently there are two locations for SM Supermalls drive-in theaters. Movies by the Bay Drive-In Cinema is located at the SM Mall of Asia, Seaside Blvd, Pasay City in the National Capital Region, Metro Manila.

=== Spain ===
The first drive-in theater in Spain opened in Madrid opposite Barajas Airport in 1958 called Motercine.

=== Sweden ===
In 2011, Stockholm International Film Festival organized its first drive-in theater in the suburb of Ropsten, with a screening of The Greatest Movie Ever Sold. After a hiatus, the event was reintroduced during the COVID-19 pandemic in 2020 as a response to restrictions on public gatherings. Since then, it has become the largest drive-in theater in the Nordic region and an annual five-day event held each June, featuring outdoor screenings on a large LED screen in Älvsjö and near the Solvalla race track.

== See also ==
- Societal effects of cars
- List of drive-in theaters
- Outdoor cinema
- Inflatable movie screen
