= Outdoor cinema =

Cinema operating outdoors

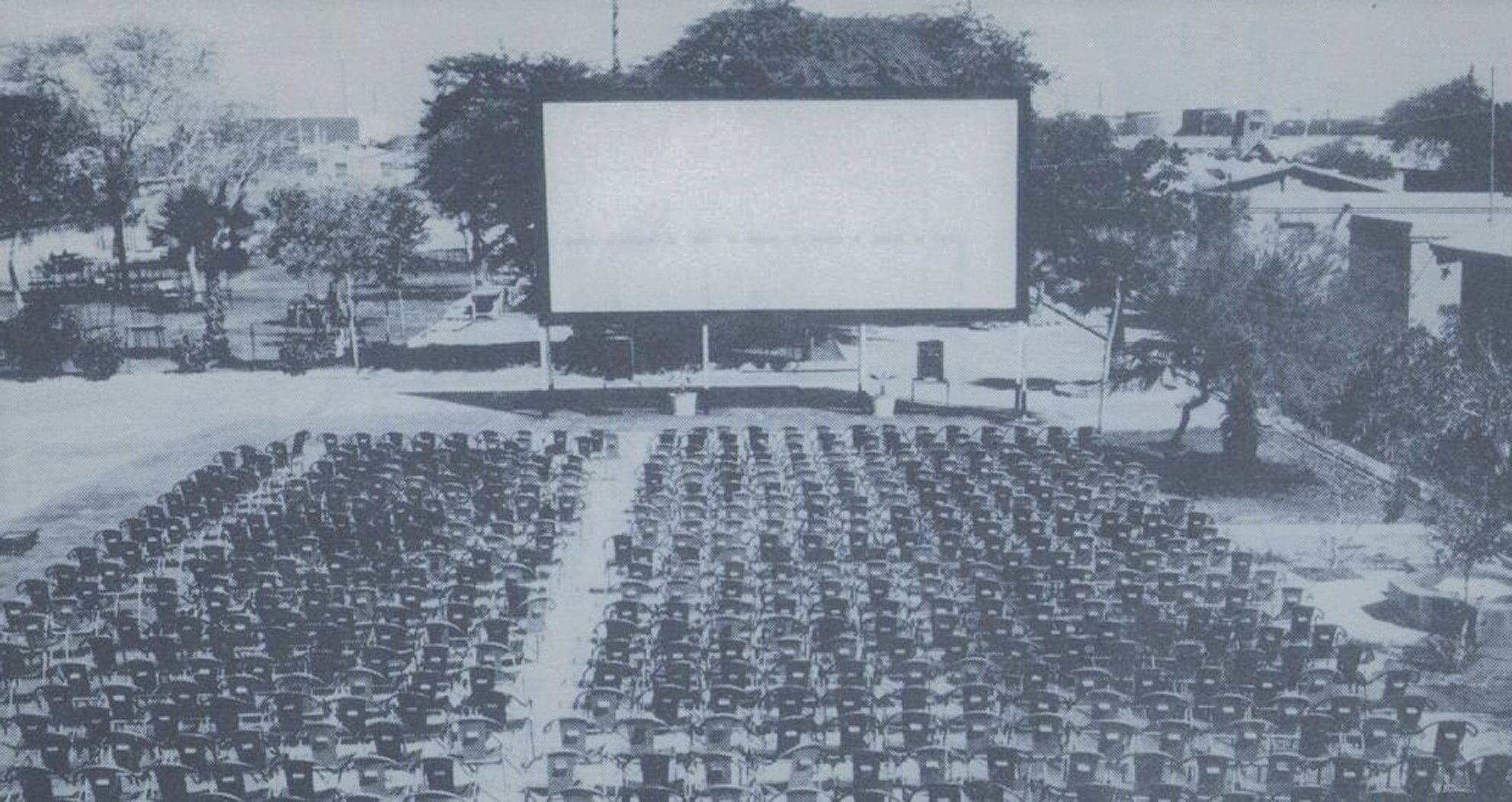
Outdoor cinema in Abadan, Iran, 1960s

Outdoor cinema, also known as open-air cinema, consists of digital or analog movie projectors, a large screen, often scaffolded construction or inflatable movie screen, and a sound system. It is a format of cinema viewing that takes place outdoors, instead of in enclosed theaters.

== History ==
It is hard to pinpoint the exact origin of outdoor cinemas, but they began popping up across the world during the early 1920s, in tandem with the rise of cinema itself.

=== Greece ===
For instance, in the summer of 1900, in Syntagma square, Athens, films were projected outdoors, in the cafés. These kinds of cinemas are still very popular in Greece during the summer. At its peak in the 1960s, the city of Athens hosted more than 600 outdoor cinemas.

=== United States ===
During the 1920s, many "rooftop theatres" were converted to cinema use. One example of this was the Loew's New York, located on Times Square. In 1951, National Theater (Manhattan) rooftop theatre re-opened as a cinema. Drive-in theaters also gained popularity during the late 1940s through the 1960s, becoming a staple in American culture.

=== China ===
In Communist China, particularly during the Mao era (1949–1976), outdoor cinema played a significant role as both entertainment and propaganda. Mobile projection units traveled to rural villages and factory courtyards, often setting up makeshift screens to show films under the open sky. These screenings were free and widely attended, especially in areas where people had limited access to electricity or indoor theaters. People would travel for miles, commonly traveling by foot to get there. The films shown were carefully curated by the state and typically included revolutionary operas, documentaries, and model dramas that aligned with Chinese Communist Party ideology. Outdoor cinema became a communal activity, reinforcing collective values while disseminating political messages, and it left a lasting impression on generations of Chinese citizens who associated it with both entertainment and ideological education.

These outdoor cinema events served a dual function; they offered communal entertainment in an era of scarcity and limited individual freedoms, while also functioning as ideological reinforcement. Local officials and hired projectionists often held short political discussions before or after screenings to emphasize the "lessons" of the film. In a society where mass communication was tightly controlled, outdoor cinema was an essential part of the CCP's cultural strategy, creating a shared visual and ideological experience for millions across China. Even today, memories of these open-air screenings evoke nostalgia for an era when cinema was both a social gathering and a window into the Party's vision of the world.

=== Outdoor Cinema's Evolution ===
As projector prices have decreased, guerrilla-style outdoor cinemas have become more common. These are run on a very small budget by groups of amateurs. The events are commonly organised online; participants then meet in parks, empty parking lots, or other public places. Guerrilla outdoor cinemas are very basic, often needing to be completely set up and dismantled in a single night. Sheets, portable screens, or existing walls are used as a screen for the projected image. Power is obtained from generators or car batteries.

== Examples ==
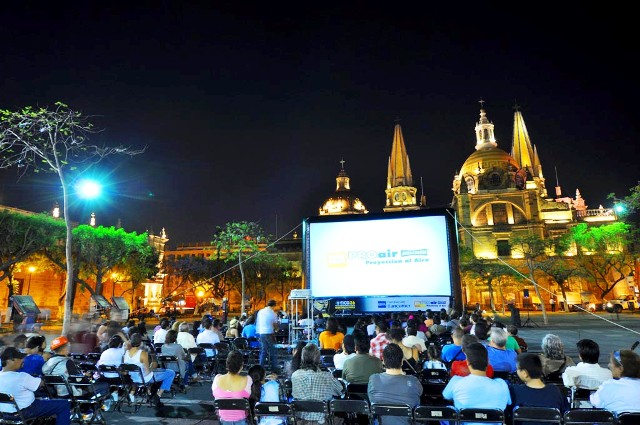
Outdoor movie nights at Guadalajara International Film Festival

The world's oldest outdoor cinema, still in operation, is Sun Picture Gardens in Broome, Western Australia. Athens has 65 outdoor cinemas. Other outdoor cinemas include the Outdoor Cinema Food Fest in California, Oshkosh's Fly-In theater, Screen on the Green (Atlanta) or Sunset Cinema in Australia. More and more often prestigious film festivals add outdoor movies to their regular screenings. Some of the most important outdoor movie events were the world premiere of Shark Tale on St. Mark's Square at Venice Film Festival (2004) and outdoor at Dubai International Film Festival (2011).

Also, more private outdoor cinemas operate, sometimes as a part of a pool or backyard party. Unusual locations to show a movie outdoors include skyscraper rooftops, screens floating on a lake with spectators sitting on boats, screenings where guests watch a movie in hot tubs or drive-in cinemas on the top floor of a parking garage. A special type of outdoor cinema is the drive-in theater.

In cold-weather climates, public film screenings have been projected onto surfaces of snow, in such countries as Finland and Canada.

== See also ==
- List of drive-in theaters
- Inflatable movie screen
