= Fujiyama (disambiguation) =

Fujiyama, better known in English as Mount Fuji, is the highest mountain in Japan.

Fujiyama may also refer to:

- Fujiyama (surname), a Japanese surname
- Fujiyama (roller coaster), steel roller coaster at Fuji-Q Highland, Fujiyoshida, Yamanashi, Japan
- Fujiyama Station, train station in Rumoi, Hokkaidō, Japan
- Japanese warship Fujiyama, Japanese steam frigate built in 1864
