= Arthur C. McGill =

American philosopher

The Reverend Arthur McGill
- Born: August 7, 1926; Wolfville, Nova Scotia, Canada
- Died: September 10, 1980 (aged 54); Boston, Massachusetts, US
- Spouse: Lucy McGill (m. 1951)

Ecclesiastical career
- Religion: Christianity
- Church: Congregational Christian Churches
- Ordained: 1952

Academic background
- Education: Harvard University; Yale University
- Thesis: The Place of Dogmatic Theology in the University (1961)

Academic work
- Discipline: Theology
- Institutions: Wesleyan University; Princeton University; Harvard University
- Notable students: David Cain
- Influenced: Daphne Hampson

Arthur Chute McGill (1926–1980) was a Canadian-born American theologian and philosopher.

== Biography ==
Born in Wolfville, Nova Scotia, on August 7, 1926, McGill moved to Brookline, Massachusetts, later that year where he attended Rivers Country Day School, still extant today. He is mentioned in The Lustre of Our Country The American Experience of Religious Freedom, by prominent Senior Circuit Judge John T. Noonan Jr. The two men prayed and sung Protestant hymns together at the school, and Noonan refers to him as a boyhood rival: "... my River's classmate, Arthur Chute McGill, who later became a professor at Harvard Divinity School. But at Rivers I thought of Arthur as my chief academic rival, doubly formidable because his uncle, Austin Chute, was our Latin teacher".

He earned a Bachelor of Arts degree in physics from Harvard University in 1941, followed by a Bachelor of Divinity degree from Yale Divinity School in 1951. In 1961 he completed a Doctor of Philosophy degree from Yale with his dissertation titled The Place of Dogmatic Theology in the University. He taught at Amherst College and Wesleyan University between 1952 and 1957, then in 1961 he accepted an Assistant Professorship at Princeton University where he was a voice for the inclusion of women in higher education in relation to the benefits of coeducation. In 1971, McGill was elected to the position of Bussey Professor of Theology at Harvard Divinity School where he taught until his death at 54. According to Harvard University's President's Report of 1980–1981 "McGill also held a Fulbright Scholarship at the University of Louvain, Belgium, in 1958 and was Cadbury Lecturer at the University of Birmingham, England, in 1969. He won a number of prizes for his teaching and was guest minister at churches throughout the country."

McGill died on September 10, 1980, in Boston, Massachusetts.

== Theological and philosophical interests ==
The author and editor of 25 books and/or articles in 48 publications in two languages, McGill's theological interests included process theology, phenomenology, relational Christology, evangelicalism, death, suffering, and theodicy. He had little patience for absolutism or monism and advocated for a God capable of change. Though McGill rejected dogmas and static doctrines, he embraced and defended the doctrine of the Trinity. In terms of philosophical schools, he could be classified as an American Pragmatist. In terms of biblical study, he was not a literalist nor did he believe the Bible to be inerrant. He did believe, however, in the primary importance of the biblical text as it served to interpret the life of Christ in the believer's context. His theological method called for New Testament biblical studies that grounded theological interpretation in scholarly analysis and the historical context of first-century Palestine. He believed, however, that the interpretive context was enlivened and made "fresh" by the personal struggles of the believer. He was also interested in the forms and poetry.

In the words of Timothy George shortly after McGill's death, "For him theology was never an armchair exercise ... it was always a matter of life and death, a struggle over ultimates. ... he draws upon New Testament exegesis, phenomenology of religion, and history of doctrine to present a Christian theology of suffering".

Respected as a theologian and professor during his lifetime, interest in his publications waned after his death. Over the last few years, however, his work has enjoyed a resurgence, especially his books on suffering and death. Through the work of David Cain, McGill's former student from Princeton Theological Seminary and currently professor of religion at the University of Mary Washington and an ordained United Church of Christ minister, together with McGill's widow Lucille "Lucy" McGill, McGill's works are being republished.

More information about Arthur C. McGill's professional contributions to the field, and a list of his publications, can be found in David Cain's article "Arthur McGill: A Memoir".

== Publications ==
- McGill, Arthur C. The Twilight World of Popular Songs, Religious Education 49, 1954. p 382-88
- McGill, Arthur C. Reason in a Violent World, The Distrust of Reason. Wesleyan UP: Middletown, CT. 1959. p 34-50.
- McGill, Arthur C. The Place of Dogmatic Theology in the University Ph.D Diss. Yale University. 1961.
- McGill, Arthur C. The Celebration of the Flesh: Poetry in Christian Life. Association Press:NY. 1964.
- McGill, Arthur C. The End of Intimacy Christian Faith and Higher Education Institute: East Lansing, MI. 1965.
- McGill, Arthur C. The Education of Specialists The Christian Scholar, Spring 1966.
- McGill, Arthur C. The Many-Faced Argument with John Hick Eds. Macmillan:NY. 1967.
- McGill, Arthur C. The Death of God and All That in Radical Theology: Phase Two. C.W.Christian and Glenn R. Wittig Eds. Lippincott: Philadelphia. 1967. p 45-58.
- McGill, Arthur C. Technology and Love--A Human Problem Man in Nature and the Nature of Man. Fifth Combined Plan Conference, Arden house, Harriman, NY, 5-8. Nov. 1967.
- McGill, Arthur C. Suffering: A Test of Theological Method Geneva: Philadelphia. 1968. Reprinted Westminster Press, 1982.
- McGill, Arthur C. Critique II Theology Today 25 (1968) 317-19.
- McGill, Arthur C. Is Private Charity Coming to an End? Vanguard: A Bulletin for Church Officers 6 (1969) 3-6, 16.
- McGill, Arthur C. The Ambiguous Position of Christian Theology, Paul Ramsey and John F Wilson Eds., The Study of Religion in Colleges and Universities. Princeton UP: Princeton. 1970. p105-38.
- McGill, Arthur C. The Crisis of Faith Thesis Theological Cassettes: Pittsburgh. 1974.
- McGill, Arthur C. Structures of Inhumanity Alan M. Olson Ed. Disguises of the Demonic. Association: NY. 1975.
