= Paino =

Paino may refer to:

- Paino Hehea (born 1979), rugby player
- Troy Paino, academic, president of University of Mary Washington, Fredericksburg, VA
