= Laura Sumner =

Laura Sumner may refer to:

- Laura Sumner (numismatist), American classical numismatist and poet
- Laura Avery Sumner, a character from the soap opera Knots Landing
