= David Cain =

David Cain may refer to:

- David Cain (professor) (1941–2021), professor of religion
- David Cain (Texas politician), former State Senator of the 2nd District of Texas, see Florence Shapiro
- David Cain (composer) (died 2019), musical technician
- David Cain (character), a comic book character

== See also ==
- David Cane (disambiguation)
- David Kane (disambiguation)
