= Virginia State Teachers College =

Virginia State Teachers College may refer to:

- James Madison University, formerly Virginia State Teachers College (Harrisonburg)
- Longwood University, formerly Virginia State Teachers College (Farmville)
- Radford University, formerly Virginia State Teachers College (Radford)
- University of Mary Washington, formerly Virginia State Teachers College (Fredericksburg)
