= Longstreth =

Longstreth is a surname. Notable people with the surname include:

- Alec Longstreth (born 1979), comics creator and illustrator
- Bevis Longstreth, retired lawyer and former Commissioner of the United States Securities and Exchange Commission
- David Longstreth (born 1981), American singer and musician
- Jake Longstreth (born 1977), American painter and radio personality
- Richard Longstreth (born 1946), architectural historian and a professor at George Washington University
- Thacher Longstreth (1920–2003), Republican member of the Philadelphia City Council
