= Søren Kierkegaard Society =

American philosophical association

The Søren Kierkegaard Society (U.S.A.) is a philosophical society whose purpose is to promote the study of the philosophy and theology of Søren Kierkegaard in the United States. The society is affiliated with both the American Academy of Religion and the American Philosophical Association. They often present papers at the AAR annual conference.

== Officers ==
Current officers of the society are: Brian Söderquist, St. Olaf College (President), Jeffrey Hanson, New College of Florida (Vice-President), Elizabeth X. Li, University of Copenhagen (Secretary) Tom Millay, St. Olaf College (Treasurer), Amber Bowen, Redeemer University (APA Representative), and Claudia Welz, Aarhus University (AAR Representative)

Past Presidents were:

Robert L. Perkins,† Stetson University

Merold Westphal, Fordham University

John Donnelly, University of San Diego

Sylvia Walsh, Stetson University

C. Stephen Evans, Baylor University

M. Jamie Ferreira, University of Virginia

Andrew Burgess, University of New Mexico

Wanda Warren Berry, Colgate University

David Cain, University of Mary Washington

David Gouwens, Brite Divinity School

Mark Lloyd Taylor, Seattle University

Vanessa Rumble, Boston College

Norman Lillegard, University of Tennessee

Lee Barrett, Lancaster Theological Seminary

John J. Davenport, Fordham University

Edward F. Mooney, Syracuse University

Rick Anthony Furtak, Colorado College

George Connell, Concordia College

Sheridan Hough, College of Charleston

J. Aaron Simmons, Furman University

Marcia Robinson, Syracuse University

Michael Strawser, University of Central Florida
