= William M. Anderson Jr. =

American academic and education administrator (born 1942)

- Born: January 15, 1942 (age 84)
- Education: Virginia Commonwealth University; Virginia Polytechnic Institute and State University
- Occupation: Education Administrator
- Known for: Former President of University of Mary Washington

William M. Anderson Jr. (born January 15, 1942) is an American academic and education administrator. He is best known as the President of the University of Mary Washington, serving from 1983 to 2006.

== Education ==
Anderson received a Bachelor of Science degree from Virginia Commonwealth University. He earned his master's degree in public administration at West Virginia University College of Graduate Studies. He went on to receive his doctorate in higher education from Virginia Polytechnic Institute and State University.

== Career ==
Anderson began working in higher education in 1967, serving as the Virginia State Council of Higher Education's coordinator of academic programs and enrollment research and later working as the West Virginia Board of Regents' director of research and planning.

Anderson began his time at Mary Washington College in 1976 after being appointed Executive Vice President. He would become the youngest president of Virginian four-year schools of higher education after his appointment in 1983. He would later be recognized as the longest-serving president of any Virginian public institution.

He oversaw over $120 million in university capital improvements during his time as president, including a new campus center, library, science center, the Jepson Alumni Executive Center, the Ridderhof Martin Gallery, an improved campus walk, an apartment complex, and four new residence halls. His fundraising for these projects resulted in the obtainment of the largest endowment the university had ever received. His spearheading of a graduate program ultimately led to Mary Washington gaining university status in 2004.

In February 2005, Anderson announced his plan to retire following the end of the 2005-2006 academic year.

== Recognition ==
In 2011, the University of Mary Washington's convocation center was named in his honor.
