= Tōgeshita Station =

Former railway station in Rumoi, Hokkaido, Japan

Tōgeshita Station 峠下駅
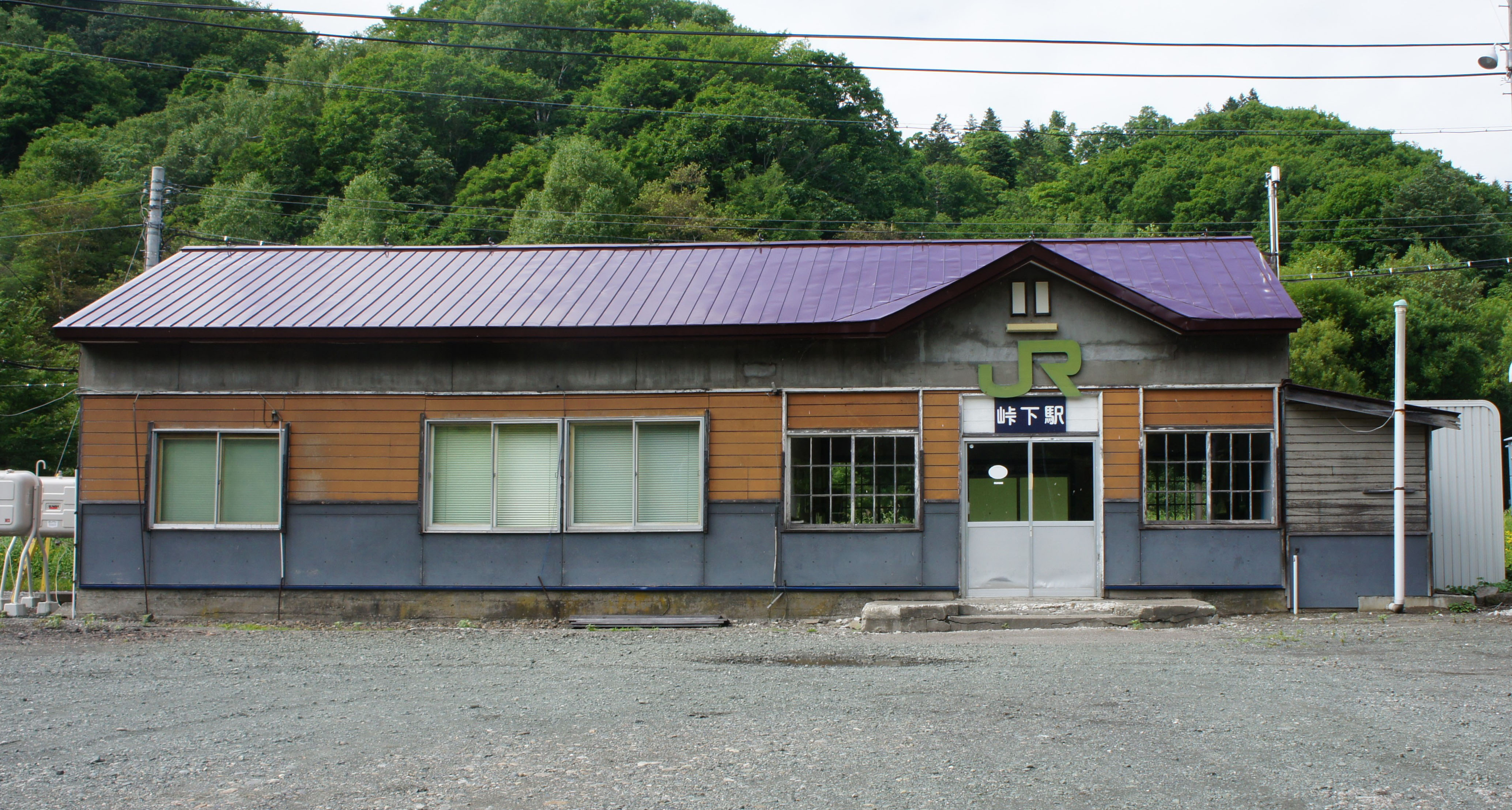

General information
- Location: Rumoi, Hokkaidō; Japan
- Coordinates: 43.85076°N 141.81920°E
- Operated by: Hokkaido Railway Company
- Line: Rumoi Main Line
Location

Tōgeshita Station (峠下駅, Tōgeshita-eki) was a train station in Rumoi, Hokkaidō, Japan.

== Lines ==
- Hokkaido Railway Company
  - Rumoi Main Line

== Station layout ==
This station had two opposed side platforms serving two tracks. This was the only station where train meet is possible in Rumoi Main Line. After being abolished, the station building has collapsed due to snow weight.

== Adjacent stations ==
«	Service	»
Rumoi Main Line
Ebishima	Local	Horonuka
