= Merold Westphal =

American philosopher of religion

- Born: 1940 (age 85–86)

Academic background
- Education: Yale University (PhD, 1967)
- Thesis: The Unity of Reason in Hegel's 'Phanomenologie' (1967)

Academic work
- Era: Contemporary philosophy
- Sub-discipline: Philosophy of religion
- Region: Western philosophy
- School or tradition: German idealism, phenomenology
- Institutions: Fordham University; Australian Catholic University
- Notable ideas: Criticism of ontotheology

Merold Westphal (born 1940) is an American philosopher who is distinguished emeritus professor of philosophy at Fordham University, and an Honorary Professor at Australian Catholic University. Westphal is one of the preeminent thinkers in the field of continental philosophy of religion.

== Biography ==
Westphal is a distinguished philosopher who graduated summa cum laude from Wheaton College, Illinois and earned his Ph.D. in philosophy as a Woodrow Wilson Fellow at Yale University in 1967. He began teaching at Wheaton before joining the Yale philosophy faculty, where he became a fellow of Jonathan Edwards College and was promoted to associate professor in 1972. In 1987, he joined Fordham University as Professor of Philosophy, later serving as director of Graduate Studies and being named Distinguished Professor in 1997. Westphal has also taught at Juniata College, Loyola College in Maryland, Villanova University, Harvard Divinity School, and Fuller Theological Seminary.

Westphal has also held leadership roles in several philosophical organizations, serving as president of the Hegel Society of America and the Søren Kierkegaard Society, executive co-director of the Society for Phenomenology and Existential Philosophy, and as a board member of the American Philosophical Association.

== Publications ==
- Westphal, Merold (2017). In Praise of Heteronomy. Indiana University Press. doi:10.2307/j.ctt1zxz1pf. ISBN 978-0-253-02638-5. JSTOR j.ctt1zxz1pf.
- History and Truth in Hegel's Phenomenology, Third Edition. Indiana University Press. 22 September 1998. ISBN 978-0-253-21221-4.
- Hegel, Freedom, and Modernity. SUNY Press. January 1992. ISBN 978-0-7914-1015-8.
- Method and speculation in Hegel's Phenomenology. Humanities Press. 1982. ISBN 978-0-391-02336-9.
- God, Guilt, and Death: An Existential Phenomenology of Religion. Indiana University Press. 1984. ISBN 978-0-253-32586-0.

=== Articles ===
- Westphal, M. (1968). "In Defense of the Thing in Itself". Kant-Studien. 59 (1–4). doi:10.1515/kant.1968.59.1-4.118.
- Westphal, Merold (2000). "Hegel and Onto-Theology". Bulletin of the Hegel Society of Great Britain. 21 (1–2): 142–165. doi:10.1017/S026352320000745X.
