= Ōwada Station (Hokkaido) =

Former railway station in Rumoi, Hokkaido, Japan

Ōwada Station 大和田駅
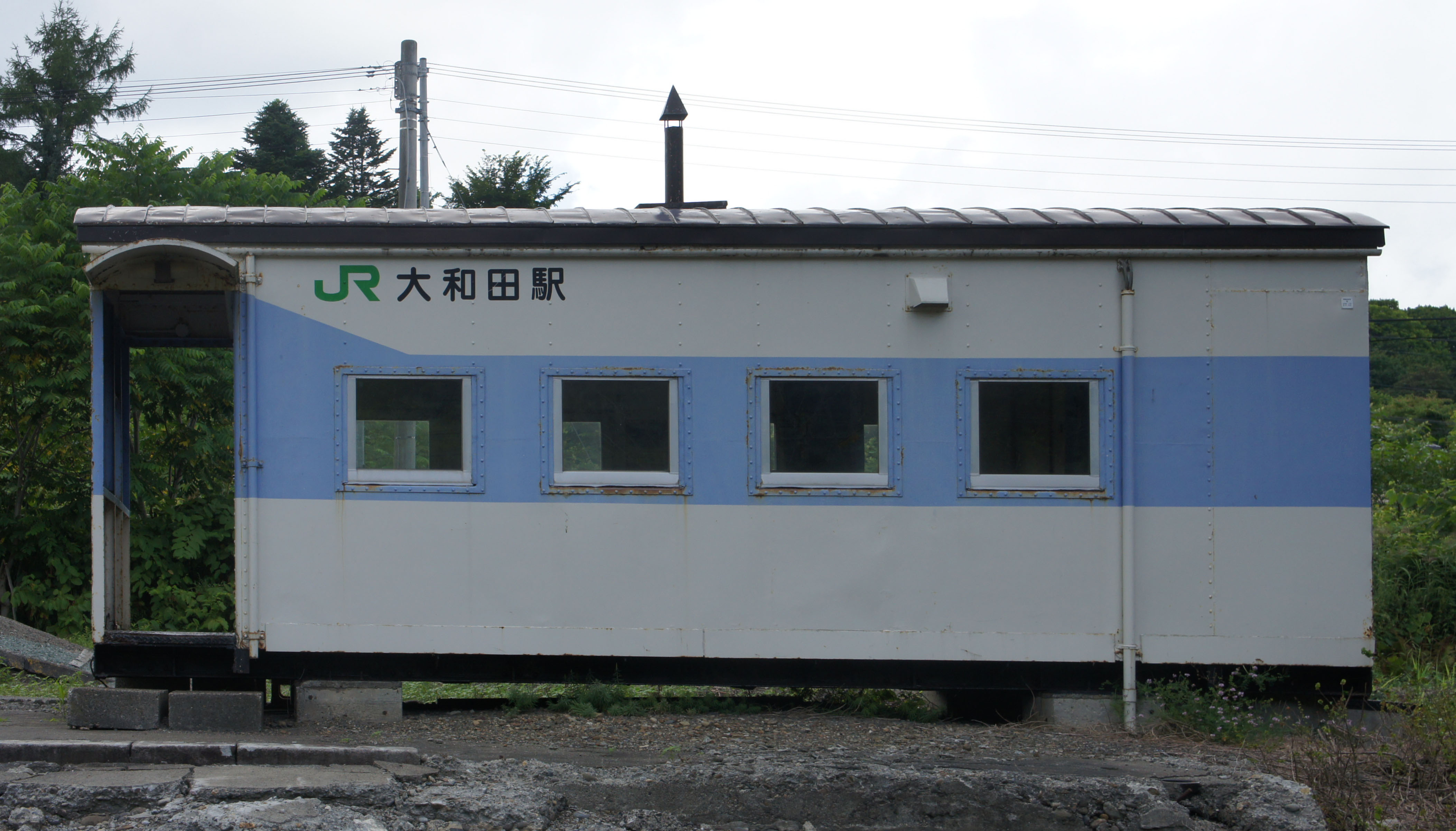

General information
- Location: Rumoi, Hokkaidō; Japan
- Coordinates: 43°54′49″N 141°41′51″E
- Operated by: Hokkaido Railway Company
- Line: Rumoi Main Line
Location

Ōwada Station (大和田駅, Ōwada-eki) was a train station in Rumoi, Hokkaidō, Japan.

The station closed on 1 April 2023 owing to poor patronage.

== Lines ==
- Hokkaido Railway Company
  - Rumoi Main Line

== Adjacent stations ==
«	Service	»
Rumoi Main Line
Fujiyama	Local	Rumoi
