= Laura Sumner (numismatist) =

American poet and numismatist

- Born: Laura Bennett Voelkel; September 5, 1921; Brooklyn, New York, USA
- Died: June 18, 1993 (aged 71); Fredericksburg, Virginia, USA
- Occupations: Numismatist; Classical scholar
- Spouse: Raiford Eve Sumner (m. 1953)

Academic background
- Education: Johns Hopkins University
- Thesis: The Coins of the Emperor Domitian (1945)

Laura Bennett Sumner (née Voelkel; September 5, 1921 – June 18, 1993) was an American classical numismatist and poet, who was a professor at the University of Mary Washington.

== Biography ==
Laura Bennett Voelkel was born in 1921 in Brooklyn, New York to John and Laura (Bennett) Voelkel. She studied for her undergraduate degree at Vassar College and graduated in 1942. She then studied for her MA at Johns Hopkins University, graduating in 1943. Sumner continued to study there for her PhD, which she was awarded in 1945 for a thesis entitled “The Coin Types of the Emperor Domitian”.

In 1945 Sumner was appointed as Assistant Professor of History of Art at Wesleyan College in Georgia, where she taught for two years. In 1947 she was appointed Assistant Professor at Mary Washington College, where she was to teach for the subsequent thirty-two years. Sumner was dedicated to teaching and pedagogy, with many students remembering her with enthusiasm. This meant that she did not publish widely.

However, she did work on both the excavations in 1963 and the subsequent catalogue of the coins from Kenchreai. She was passionate about the ability that numismatics had to "make the past come alive for students". Other publications included a commentary on the Lusiads. She was also involved with Mary Washington's archaeology society.

Sumner also held multiple Visiting Fellowships at universities in the USA, including: University of Wisconsin, University of Iowa, and Humanities Institute, Fairfax.

== Awards and fellowships ==
- Overseas Fellow of the Royal Numismatic Society. She was first elected in 1945.
- President (1970–71), Vice-President (1958-60) - Southern Section of the Classical Association of the Middle West and South.

== Personal life ==
In addition to her classical scholarship, Sumner also wrote and published poetry. She married Raiford Eve Sumner on December 20, 1953. She died on June 18, 1993, aged 71, in Fredericksburg, Virginia.
