= C. Stephen Evans =

American philosopher (born 1948)

- Born: May 26, 1948 (age 78); Atlanta, Georgia, U.S.
- Occupation: Philosopher

Charles Stephen Evans (born May 26, 1948) is an American philosopher and expert on Søren Kierkegaard.

== Biography ==
Charles Stephen Evans was born on May 26, 1948, in Atlanta, Georgia. He holds a BA with high honors (philosophy) from Wheaton College, an MPhil (philosophy) from Yale University, and a PhD (philosophy) from Yale University. Before coming to Baylor, he taught at Wheaton College, St. Olaf College (where he also served as curator of the Howard V. and Edna H. Hong Kierkegaard Library) and Calvin College (where he was the inaugural holder of the William Spoelhof Teacher–Scholar Chair and Dean for Research and Scholarship). He serves on the editorial boards of multiple publications, including Kierkegaard Monographs and the International Kierkegaard Commentary Series, and is a past president of the Society of Christian Philosophers (1998–2001) and the Søren Kierkegaard Society, USA (1991).

He is an expert on Søren Kierkegaard and has published extensively on subjects including philosophy of religion and the relationship of psychology and Christianity. He is University Professor of Philosophy and Humanities Emeritus Baylor University.

== Areas of inquiry ==
=== Minimal dualism ===
Evans has defended a type of substance dualism termed minimal dualism that combines aspects of the Cartesian and Thomistic view of persons in a Christian framework.

=== The naïve teleological argument ===
Evans has advanced the naïve teleological argument, which argues that the fact that world appears to be designed is reason to think that it is design, and that, if God exists, this appearance of design further functions as a natural sign by which God reveals himself.

== Awards and honors ==
Evans's numerous awards and fellowships include:

- The C. S. Lewis Book Prize, awarded by St. Thomas Philosophy of Religion Project at the University of St. Thomas for the best recent book in philosophy of religion, 2012. Awarded for Natural Signs and the Knowledge of God: A New Look at Theistic Arguments.
- NEH Fellowship for College Teachers, 1988–1989 and 2000–2001.

== Selected bibliography ==
- Preserving the Person: A Look at the Human Sciences (InterVarsity Press, 1977; Baker Reprint, 1982)
- Subjectivity and Religious Belief: An Historical, Critical Study (Eerdmans, 1978)
- Kierkegaard's Fragments and Postscript: The Religious Philosophy of Johannes Climacus (Humanities Press, 1983; reprinted by Humanity Books, an imprint of Prometheus Books, 1999)
- Existentialism: The Philosophy of Despair and the Quest for Hope (Zondervan, 1984; reprinted Probe Books, 1989). A revised edition of Despair: A Moment or a Way of Life? (InterVarsity Press, 1971)
- Philosophy of Religion: Thinking About Faith (InterVarsity Press, 1985). Spanish translation: Filosofía de la Religion (Editorial Mundo Hispano, 1990). Macedonian translation 2004.
- Wisdom and Humanness in Psychology (Baker Books, 1989)
- Søren Kierkegaard's Christian Psychology (Zondervan, 1990)
- Passionate Reason: Making Sense of Kierkegaard's Philosophical Fragments (Indiana University Press, 1992)
- Why Believe? Reason and Mystery as Pointers to God (Grand Rapids: Wm. B. Eerdmans, 1996). A revised version of The Quest for Faith: Reason and Mystery As Pointers to God (InterVarsity Press, 1986). Chinese edition of Why Believe? translated by Daniel Kwok-Tung Cheung (Hong Kong: FES Press, 2002).
- The Historical Christ and the Jesus of Faith: The Incarnational Narrative as History (Oxford: Oxford University Press, 1996)
- Faith Beyond Reason (Edinburgh: Edinburgh University Press, 1998; and Grand Rapids, Michigan: Wm. B. Eerdmans, 1998)
- Pocket Dictionary of Philosophy of Religion and Apologetics (Downers Grove, Illinois: InterVarsity Press, 2002). Translated and published in Portuguese by Editora Vida, 2003. Translated and published in Macedonian, 2003. Spanish translation published by Editorial Unilit in 2007.
- Kierkegaard's Ethic of Love: Divine Commands and Moral Requirements (Oxford: Oxford University Press, 2004)
- Kierkegaard on Faith and the Self: Collected Essays (Waco, Texas: Baylor University Press, 2006)
- Kierkegaard: An Introduction (Cambridge University Press, 2009)
- Natural Signs and Knowledge of God: A New Look at Theistic Arguments (Oxford University Press, 2010)
- God and Moral Obligation (Oxford University Press, 2014)
- A History of Western Philosophy: From the Pre-Socratics to Postmodernism (InterVarsity Press, 2018)

Professional and academic associations
Preceded by Eleonore Stump	President of the Society of Christian Philosophers; 1998–2001	Succeeded by Robert Audi
