= Fujiyama (surname) =

Fujiyama (written: 藤山) is a Japanese surname. Notable people with the surname include:

- Aiichirō Fujiyama (藤山 愛一郎, 1897–1985), Japanese politician and business executive
- Cosmo Fujiyama (born 1985), Japanese-American philanthropist
- Ichirō Fujiyama (藤山 一郎, 1911–1993), Japanese singer and composer
- Naomi Fujiyama (藤山 直美, born 1958), Japanese actress
- Ryuji Fujiyama (藤山 竜仁, born 1973), Japanese footballer
- Shin Fujiyama, Japanese-American philanthropist
- Tomofumi Fujiyama (藤山 智史, born 1994), Japanese footballer
