= David Kane =

David Kane may refer to:

- Dave Kane (born 1948), American radio talk show host
- Dave Kane (musician), musician, composer and band leader
- David Kane (pianist) (born 1955), American pianist, composer, and arranger
- Black Manta (David Kane), fictional nemesis of DC Comics character Aquaman
- Dave Kane (cyclist) (born c.1941), Northern Irish cyclist

== See also ==
- David Cane (disambiguation)
- David Cain (disambiguation)
