= Joey Peppersack =

American paralympic swimmer

Joseph Peppersack
Personal information
- Born: March 12, 1999 (age 27) Hopewell, Virginia, U.S.
- Education: University of Mary Washington

Sport
- Sport: Paralympic swimming
- Disability class: S8
- Coached by: Justin Anderson

Joseph Peppersack (born March 12, 1999) is an American Paralympic swimmer. He represented the United States at the 2020 Summer Paralympic Games.

== Career ==
Joseph was born in 1999 to Jody and Sandy Peppersack with a rare condition known as tibial hemimelia. This resulted in the amputation of his right leg in 2003 when he was four years old. Joey did not begin swimming until he was 9 years old, joining a local club. After a few years and constant encouragement of his natural ability, Joey was persuaded into joining competitive paraswimming in 2011.

Peppersack has competed on the world stage several times. He briefly held the American record in the S8 100m IM and the S8 200m Freestyle.

Peppersack competed in the 100 metre backstroke S8 event at the 2020 Summer Paralympics and placed 7th.

In 2022, Peppersack was renamed to the United States National Team. He retired from competitive swimming in 2023.

Since leaving the pool, Joseph has pursued a career in economic development.
