= Horonuka Station =

Former railway station in Rumoi, Hokkaido, Japan

Horonuka Station 幌糠駅
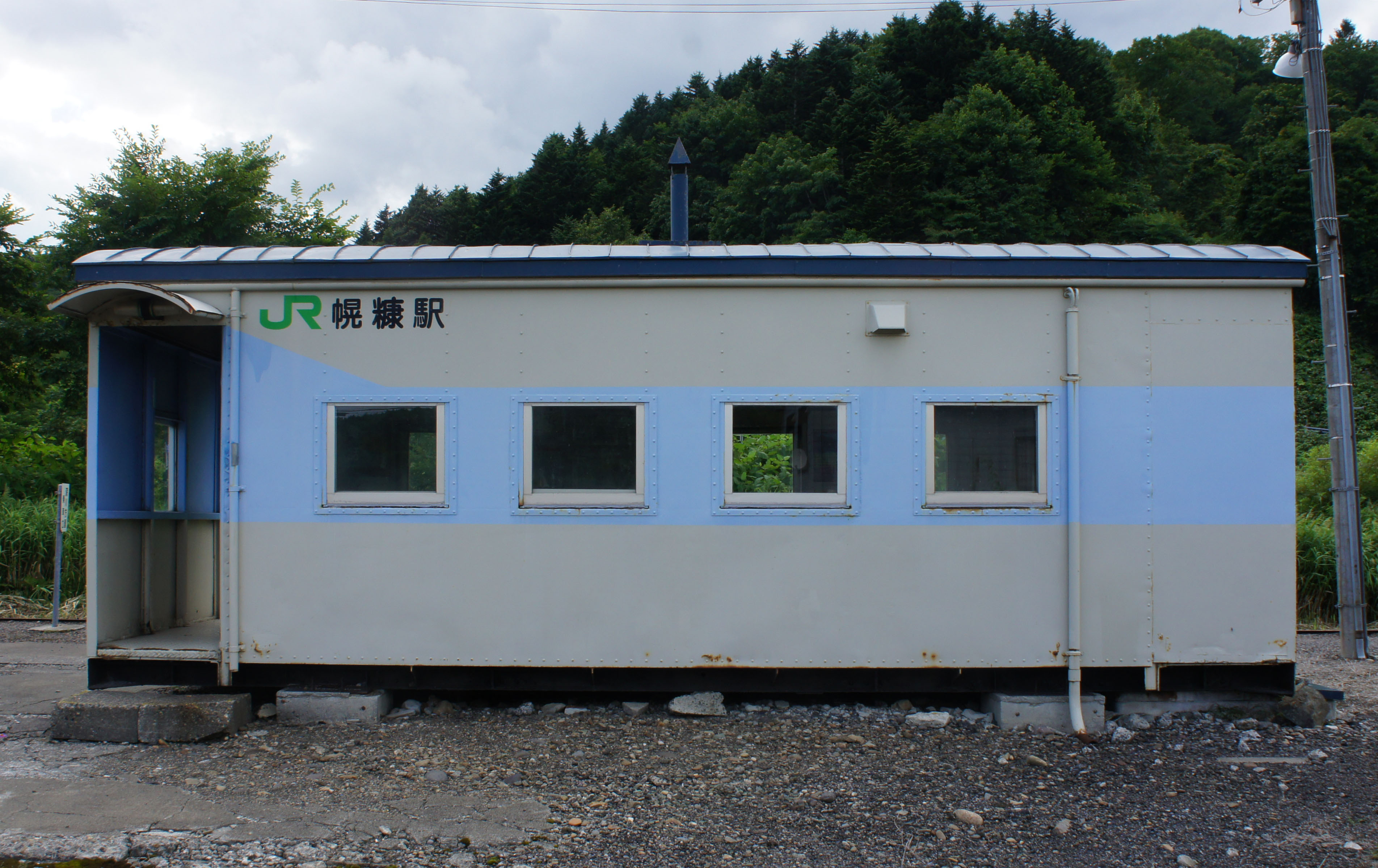

General information
- Location: Rumoi, Hokkaidō; Japan
- Coordinates: 43°51′20″N 141°45′30″E
- Operated by: Hokkaido Railway Company
- Line: Rumoi Main Line
Location

Horonuka Station (幌糠駅, Horonuka-eki) was a train station in Rumoi, Hokkaidō, Japan.

The station closed on 1 April 2023 owing to poor patronage.

== Lines ==
- Hokkaido Railway Company
  - Rumoi Main Line

== Adjacent stations ==
«	Service	»
Rumoi Main Line
Tōgeshita	Local	Fujiyama
