= Barbara Halliday =

American journalist

Barbara Jane Halliday

Mayor of Hayward, California
- In office July 2014 – December 13, 2022
- Preceded by: Michael Sweeney
- Succeeded by: Mark Salinas

Personal details
- Born: 1949 (age 76–77)
- Party: Democratic
- Education: B.A. in American studies from Mary Washington College (associated with the University of Virginia)
- Alma mater: University of Maryland
- Occupation: Writer/Editor (retired from a California insurance company in 2008)

Barbara Jane Halliday (born 1949) was the mayor of Hayward, California from 2014 to 2022. Halliday was a city council member for 10 years prior to her election as mayor. Halliday has a B.A. in American studies from Mary Washington College, then associated with the University of Virginia. She pursued graduate work in journalism and urban studies at the University of Maryland. She has worked as a writer/editor for the Cecil Whig in Maryland, and for a California insurance company, retiring from that position in 2008 after 29 years. Her term began in July 2014.

In November 2018, Halliday was re-elected to second term as Mayor, defeating Council member and college instructor Mark Salinas. Halliday received 56% of the vote compared with Councilman Mark Salinas, who had 42% of the vote.

This was the second time Halliday and Salinas competed for the Mayor's office. In 2014, Halliday was elected Mayor with 39% of the vote, compared to 32% for Salinas, 22% for Council member Francisco Zermeño and 7% for Rakesh Kumar Christian.
