= Desiree Marie Velez =

American actress

- Born: Brooklyn, New York
- Occupation: Television actor
- Parent(s): Inez Torres & Angelo Velez

Desiree Marie Velez (born June 8) is an American actress. She was born in Brooklyn, New York. She is the daughter of Inez Torres and Angelo Velez. She has one brother. Her parents are from Puerto Rico. She grew up in Brooklyn, New York, and currently lives in Washington, District of Columbia. She is a graduate of Mary Washington College in Fredericksburg, Virginia.

Her movie credits include Super Mario Bros. and Asunder. She has appeared in many television shows such as In Our Lives, Matlock, Hack, Ghost Stories, the HBO Oz series, and, most recently, October Road.
