= Françoise Astorg Bollack =

French architect

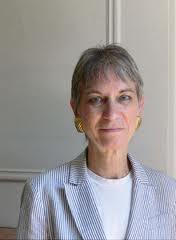
- Born: Paris, France
- Occupations: Architect educator preservationist writer on architecture and preservation
- Parent(s): Marcel Astorg, architect and painter and Raymonde Astorg, née Bisch

Françoise Astorg Bollack is a French architect, educator, preservationist, and writer on architecture and preservation. Her activities bridge the fields of education, criticism and architectural practice. Her research focuses on the creative possibilities that arise from designing with existing and/or historic buildings. Her method is based on the analysis of successful (or simply intriguing) built work.

== Education ==
- Diplôme d’Architecte from the École Spéciale d’Architecture in Paris, 1969
- Studied at the École Nationale Supérieure des Beaux Arts (ENSBA) with George Candilis
- Worked in Paris for Marot-Tremblot Associés and for Marcel Astorg Architecte.
- Worked in Mexico City for the architect Juan Sordo Madaleno, 1970

== Life and work in New York City: 1970–present ==
1970–1981

Worked as a designer for:

- I.M. Pei & Partners
- Skidmore, Owings & Merrill
- Mitchell Giurgola
- Ulrich Franzen as the design coordinator for the Philip Morris Headquarters at 120 Park Avenue, from programming to the building’s completion.

1981–present

Principal of Françoise Bollack Architects

- 1981: founded Françoise Bollack Architects, at the time, one of very few architectural firms founded and headed exclusively by a woman
- 1985: associate professor in the Preservation Program of the Graduate School of Architecture, Planning, and Preservation at Columbia University.

Architecture works

- Restoration and additions at the New York State Capitol in Albany (Assembly Chamber, Assembly Parlor, Speaker’s Office & Conference room, etc.)
- Adaptive reuse of a 19th-century school in Greenwich Village for the Lesbian and Gay Community Services Center
- Chesterwood Museum Shop and Visitor Center in Stockbridge, Massachusetts
- Numerous restoration and new designs for historic apartment building lobbies & renovation/restoration of high-end apartments in New York City.

Awards and honors

For work on LGBT Center, in New York City:

- Village Award from the Greenwich Village Society for Historic Preservation
- Certificate of Merit from the New York City Landmarks Preservation Commission
- Lucy Moses Award from the New York Landmarks Conservancy
- Citation of Merit from the Victorian Society of America
- Certificate of Merit from the Municipal Art Society: read article here

For work in the New York State Capitol in Albany:

- Award of Merit from the American Institute of Architects in 2003

For the publication of Old Buildings New Forms: New Directions in Architectural Transformations.

- Historic Preservation Book Prize, 2014, awarded by The University of Mary Washington Center for Historic Preservation

Her drawings are in Avery Library’s Drawings and Archives collection.

Public service

- Served at the City and State levels of the American Institute of Architects
- Served on the boards of Landmark West!, the Architectural League and the Neighborhood Preservation Center
- President of the Historic Districts Council, a citywide non-profit preservation organization, from 2011 to 2014, initiating a Preservation Design Award program, the popular "6 To Celebrate" program, publishing District Lines and heading a task force to preserve the historic buildings in East Midtown Manhattan.

== Architectural work in publications ==
About work in the New York State Capitol

- "Stately Restoration: New York State Capitol Assembly Chamber Floor By Françoise Bollack Architects", article by Kristen Richards in archnewsnow.com; 05/01/2004,
- "Democratic Process - At The Refurbished New York State Capitol, Françoise Bollack Gives Each Design Challenge Its Own Voice," article by Anna Holtzman, Architecture; 02/2005
- ."Portraits Françoise Bollack, Choisie pour la Rehabilitation du Capitole de l'Etat de New York: Une Architecte Engagee", Article by Catya Martin In France-Amerique #1651, 01/2004
- "Access in Albany N.Y. - State Assembly Makes Renovations", Print & Web Issue of ABLE The Newspaper Positively For, By & About The Disabled, 11/2003
- "Capitol Improvements," article by Ned Depew, In The Berkshire Home Style, 10/2003

About the museum in Chesterwood

- Chesterwood Barn Gallery & Visitor Center, In e-architect:
- Chesterwood Museum Shop and Visitor Center reviewed in DISPATCHES, by Deyan Ranko Brashich, published by New Meridian Arts, 2017.
- Chesterwood Barn Gallery & Museum Shop Published In The Monthly Architectural Record.com Building Type Studies: Adaptive Reuse. February 2004

About the LGBT Center

- Making A Grand Entrance 250 Cabrini Boardnews, winter 2005-06
- "Return To Center - How Françoise Bollack Restored The HQ For LGBTs In NYC", Feature article by Fred Bernstein in GENRE Magazine, November 200
- NEW YORK NOW, an exhibition of recent work at the AIA New York Chapter; May 2005
- L.G.B.T. Center Celebrates 20 Years In The Village; The Villager June 18–24, 2003 issue.
- A Community Center Restored, The Lesbian, Gay, Bisexual, and Transgender Community Center, New York, NY, Clem Labine's Traditional Building, November 2001
- "The Center Welcomes NYers Home" New York Blade News, July 20, 2001
- "Coming To Fruition," OUT Magazine

Competitions

- "Roosevelt Island Housing," Competitions 1968-2000, Francoise Astorg Bollack, Tom Killian, LULU Press, 2017
- "Les Halles, Paris," Competitions 1968-2000, Francoise Astorg Bollack, Tom Killian, LULU Press, 2017
- "'Manhattan Parks': Savannah Grid for New York," Competitions 1968-2000, Francoise Astorg Bollack, Tom Killian, LULU Press, 2017
- "A Monument for Melbourne," Competitions 1968-2000, Francoise Astorg Bollack, Tom Killian, LULU Press, 2017
- "The Times Tower Competition, New York," Competitions 1968-2000, Francoise Astorg Bollack, Tom Killian, LULU Press, 2017
- "Clemson University Performing Arts Center," Competitions 1968-2000, Francoise Astorg Bollack, Tom Killian, LULU Press, 2017
- "East Hampton Airport," Competitions 1968-2000, Francoise Astorg Bollack, Tom Killian, LULU Press, 2017
- "Designing The High Line - Ideas For Reclaiming 1.5 Miles Of Manhattan"

About apartment buildings and private residences

- Apartment Renovation, New York Magazine, May 2014
- Apartment Renovation and Restoration, Part, Desire To Inspire, 2010
- Art Deco Lobby Renovation And Restoration, Habitat Magazine, October 2009
- Eco-Sensitive Apartments Designed By Françoise Bollack Architects Featured In June 2006 Issue Of Interior Design
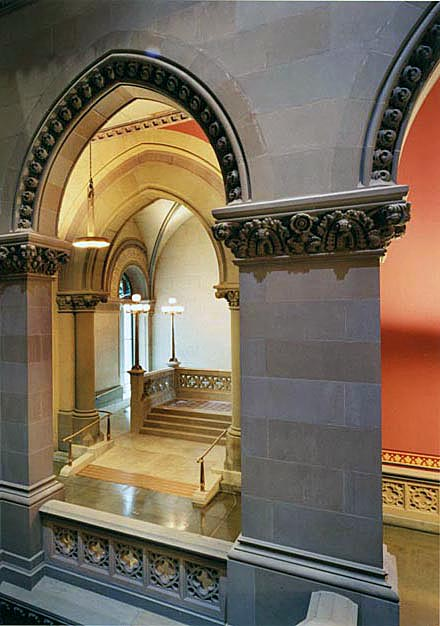
East vestibule, New York State Capitol

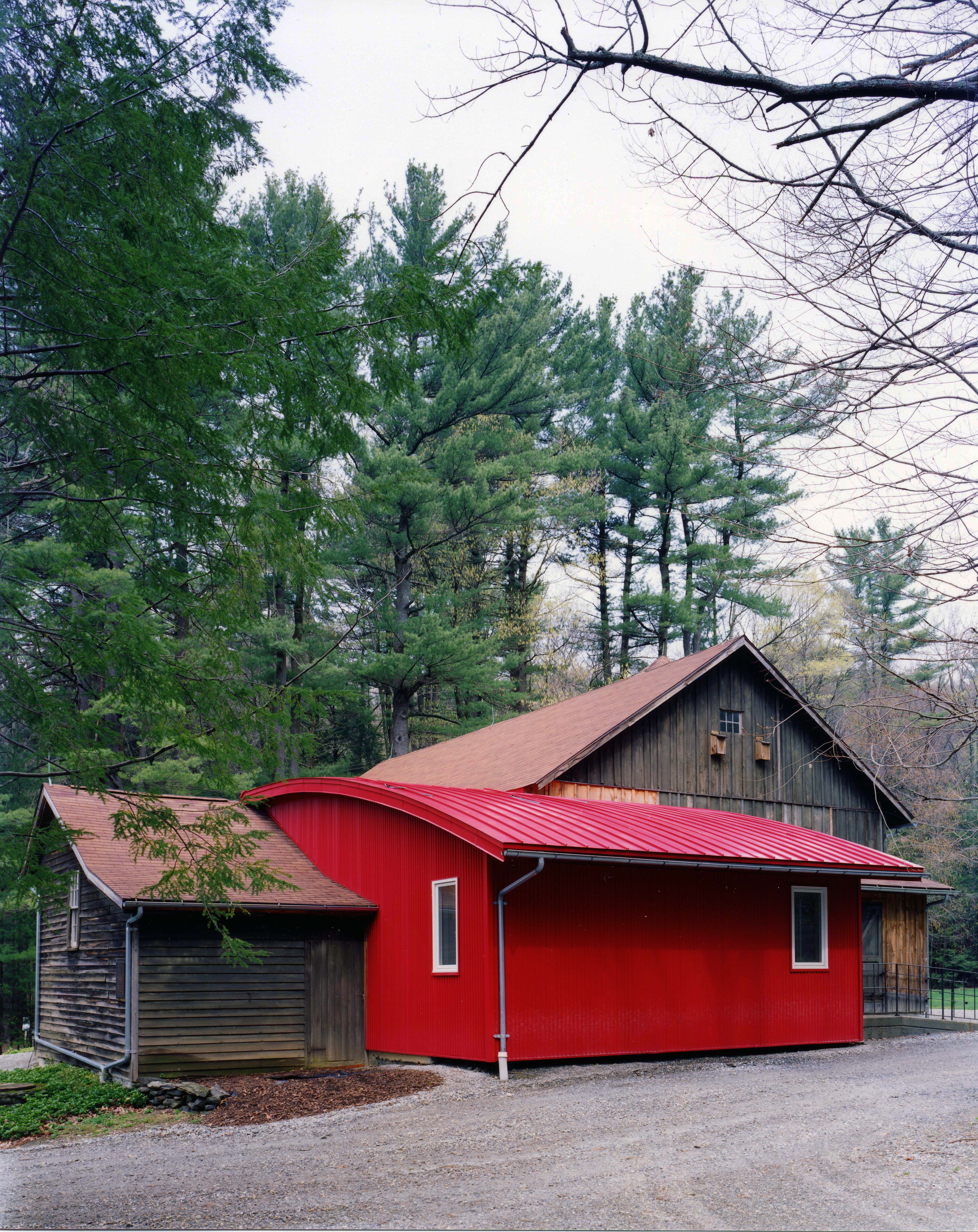
Chesterwood Barn Gallery & Visitor Center

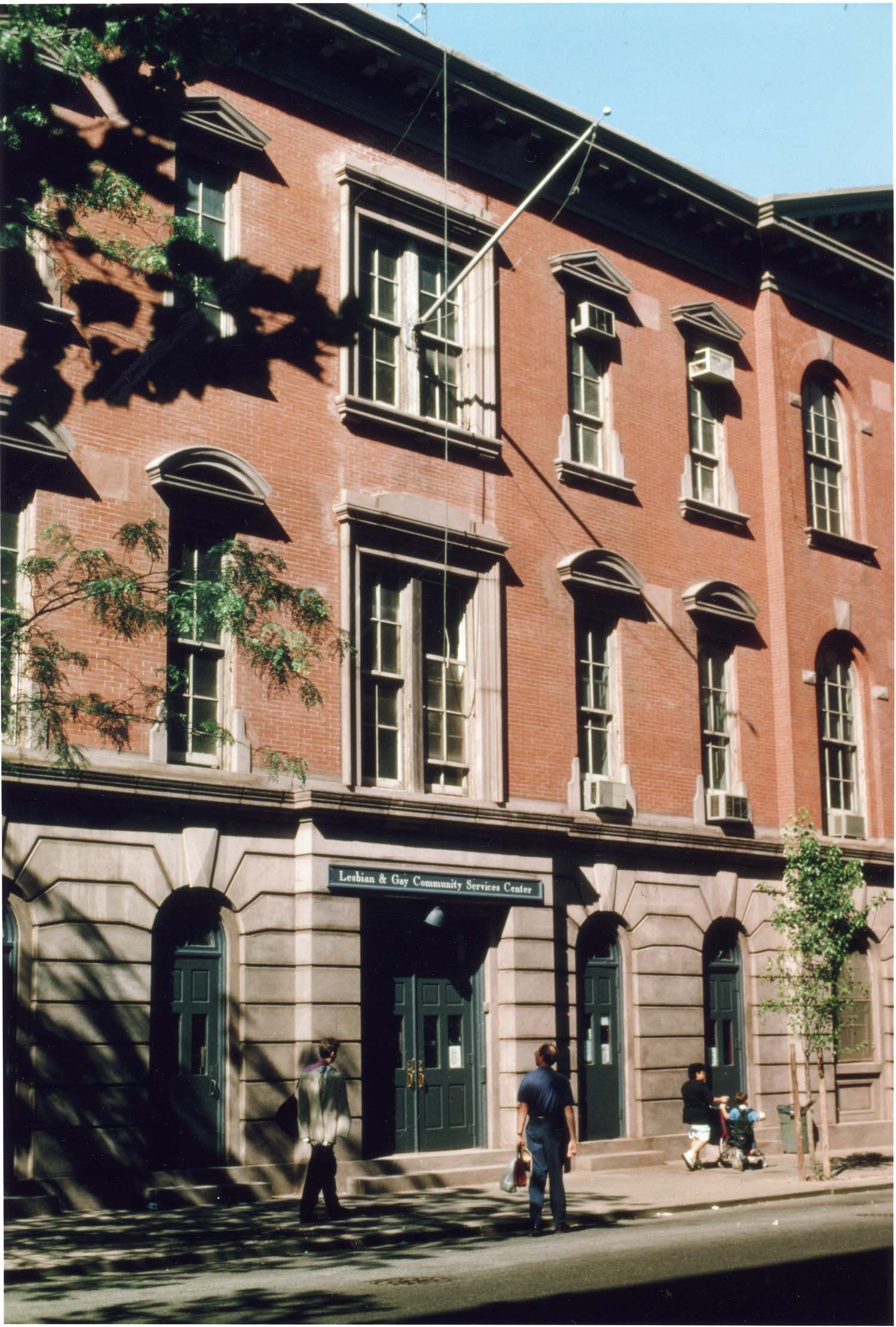
Restored facade 208 West 13th Street

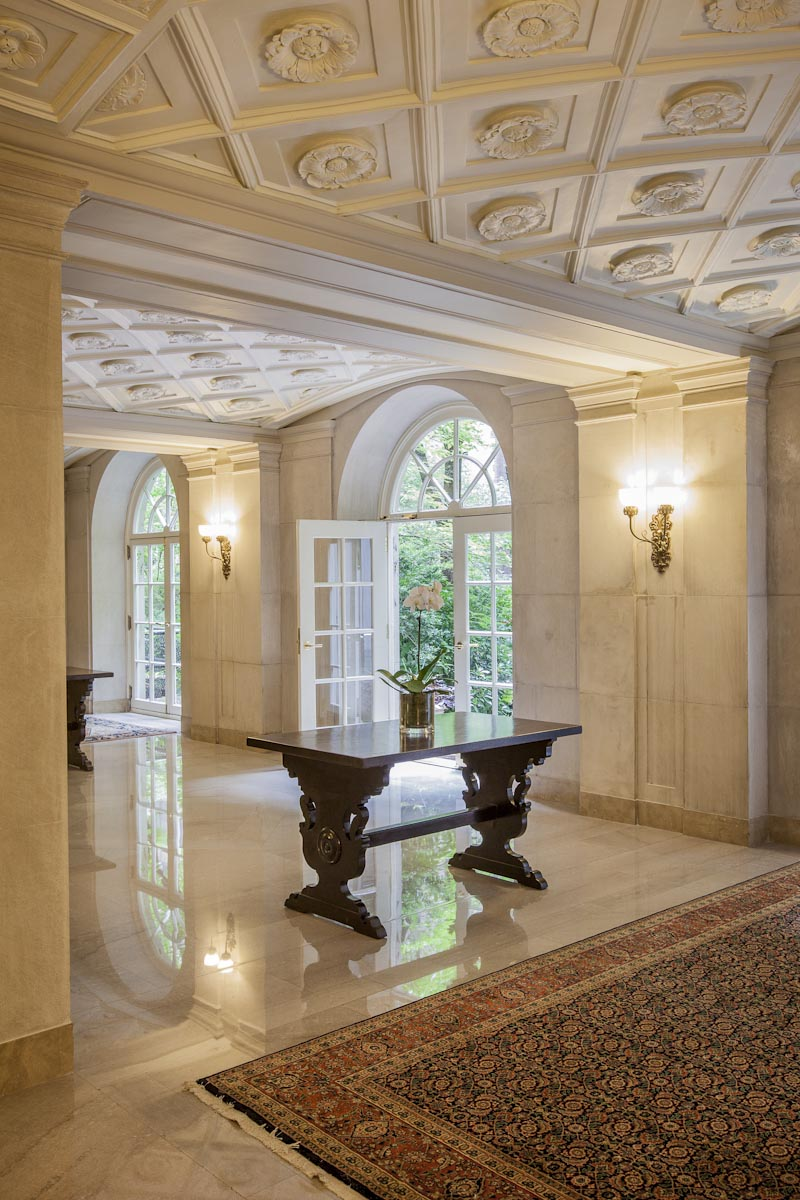
Astor Court Lobbies

== Books and articles ==
- 1988: Everyday Masterpieces – Memory and Modernity: A Study of an International Vernacular Between the Two World Wars, Co-authored with Joselita Raspi-Serra and Tom Killian, with Paolo Mascilli-Migliorini & Nicoletta Zanni, Modena Italy, Edizioni Panini, 1988
- 1995: Ely Jacques Kahn – New York Architect, co-authored with Tom Killian, New York: Acanthus Press, 1995.
- 2005: Bunshaft House Threatened, published in DoCoMoMo, National News, summer 2005, co-authored with Tom Killian, New York: Acanthus Press, 1995
- 2012: Françoise Bollack Architects: Public Work, Françoise Bollack Architects, LULU Press, 2012
- 2013: Françoise Bollack Architects: Private Work, Françoise Bollack Architects, LULU Press, 2013
- 2013: Old Buildings – New Forms: New Directions in Architectural Transformations, The Monacelli Press, 2013 (2014 Historic Preservation Book Prize from the University of Mary Washington)
- 2014: Preservation Under Attack! The Citizens and City Hall: A New Day? Published in the Historical Districts Council’s District Lines, Spring 2014
- 2014: AIA NY Oculus Book Review Of Old Building New Forms
- 2015: Defining Appropriateness published in Saving Place: 50 Years of New York City Landmarks by the Museum of the City of New York and the Monacelli Press on the 50th anniversary of the New York City Landmarks Law.
- 2015: Four Minutes On... Architectural Transformations With Françoise Astorg Bollack, AIA
- 2016: Old Cities – New Forms: A Letter from New York published in l’Architecture d’Aujourd’hui #AA412 as Tissu Ancien – Formes Nouvelles.
- 2016: Reflections on the Art of the Incomplete: Old Buildings – New Forms, published in AREA
- 2017: Competitions 1968-2000, Francoise Astorg Bollack, Tom Killian, LULU Press, 2017
- AIA NY Oculus Book Review of Old Building New Forms.

== Lectures and interviews ==
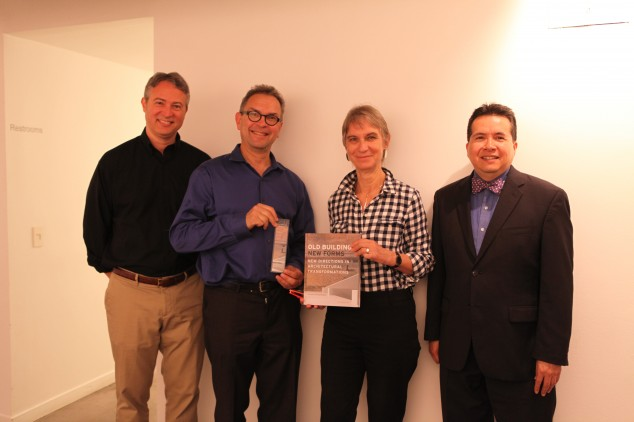
Françoise Astorg Bollack AIA book talk 2014

About Preservation

- Oculus Book Talk: Françoise Astorg Bollack, Old Buildings New Forms: New Directions in Architectural Transformations, NYCxDESIGN 2014, AIA New York, May 12, 2014
- Old Buildings | New Forms, Lecture at LSU College of Art and Design, February 23, 2015
- Old Buildings | New Forms, Lecture At Tulane School Of Architecture February 25, 2015
- Old Buildings – New Forms, Lecture at the Bedford Historical Society, February 2014
- Inquiry HP Lecture: Old Buildings New Forms, Nov. 20, 2013
- Breathe Deeply - Why Old Buildings Are Green, Lecture on the relationship between sustainability and living in historic buildings for a symposium organized by Landmark West! The Committee to Preserve the Upper West Side
- AIA NY Oculus Podcast Interview, May 30, 2014
- Interview By Susan Kathryn Hefti, in The Preservation Diaries In The Clyde Fitch Report.
- Letting the Architecture Speak for Itself, Françoise Bollack's And Tom Killian's Interviewed By Fred Bernstein, April 22, 2007
- On CNBC About The Museum Of Modern Art's Exhibit "Tall Buildings", Interview excerpted and published in BATIWEB, July 2004 read the article here
- Substitute Materials- Faux Or No? Interview published in District Lines the newsletter of the Historic Districts Council, May 2004. Read the article here
- History As Prelude: Modern Interventions In Historic Context. The Morgan Library, New York City; Respondent, February 19, 2003

On the Rebuilding at Ground Zero

- CBC Radio Canada "Indicatif Present," Interview by Jean Claude Marsan, March 10, 2003
- CNBC (Canadian National Broadcast Company): "Telejournal Le Point", September 11, 2002, September 10, 2002
- "INDICATIF>PASSE>PRESENT>FUTUR SHOW," TF 1 Television Française; August 8, 2002
- "Where Are We Now?" Radio Canada 2PM "Le Quebec en Direct", March 11, 2002
- CBC Radio Canada Roundtable discussion with Françoise Bollack and Phyllis Lambert, hosted by Pierre Maisonneuve, March 11, 2002, 7:45 PM
