= David Cane =

David Cane may refer to:

- David E. Cane (born 1944), American biological chemist
- David Cane (footballer), see 2011–12 Scottish Cup

== See also ==
- David Cain (disambiguation)
- David Kane (disambiguation)
