= Judy Hample =

American academic administrator (born 1947)

- Born: Judy Gayle Hample; October 16, 1947 (age 78)
- Education: David Lipscomb University; Ohio State University

Judy Gayle Hample is a former American academic administrator. She is the former chancellor of the Pennsylvania State System of Higher Education and the Florida Board of Regents. She served as president of the University of Mary Washington, the university's first female president.

== Early life and education ==
Hample grew up in Tennessee and wanted to be a scientist. She attended David Lipscomb University, where she was also a member of the debate team. As a student, her lab studies conflicted with her debating so she changed her focus on communications in order to continue traveling as part of the team. She earned a Bachelor of Arts from the university in 1969, majoring in communication and secondary education (French). Hample went on to attend Ohio State University, where she earned a Master of Arts and Ph.D. in communication.

== Career ==
Upon graduating from Ohio State University, Hample received her first faculty appointment as a lecturer and debate coach at the University of Illinois at Urbana-Champaign. She has held tenured professorships during all of her administrative appointments, including her first administrative appointments which came while at Western Illinois University. She was first made a department division director, later becoming assistant dean for the college of arts and sciences. Hample served as dean of the college of liberal arts and sciences at Emporia State University before moving on as the dean of the college of arts and sciences at Indiana State University in 1986. After leaving ISU, she became the senior vice president of academic affairs at the University of Toledo until joining the Florida Board of Regents in 1998.

From 1998 to 2001, Hample served in various positions for the Florida Board of Regents. She served at the vice chancellor for planning, budgeting and policy analysis from 1998 to 2001. In 1999 she was appointment executive vice chancellor. Hample was appointment as the chancellor of the Board in 2001, succeeding Adam Herbert for whom she served as the executive vice chancellor. Her appointment came at the time when then Governor Jeb Bush's plans to overhaul the Florida educational system and allow each university to have its own board was approved by the Florida Legislature. Hample worked with the regents and trustees to help with the transition. She also served as the liaison to the state task force that studied the implementation of the educational system overhaul. Hample was the last chancellor for the Board, attending the last meeting at the University of South Florida campus in May 2001.

Hample joined the Pennsylvania State System of Higher Education in 2001, becoming only the 2nd chancellor in its 34-year history. She oversaw an annual operating budget of $1.8 billion with more than 12,000 faculty and staff for a system that oversaw the 109,000-student state university system. Much of her work was centered at the Dixon University Center in Harrisburg, Pennsylvania. She reported to an appointed Board of Governors and represented the system before the state capital. During her time as Chancellor, Hample implemented a budgeting system that linked performance improvement to funding in order to enforce accountability of school's use of state funding. Her system was later adopted by approximately a third of state legislatures. She left her position in 2007 and later joined the University of Mary Washington as its eighth president.

At the University of Mary Washington, Hample was the first female president in the history of the school. Hample became the third president in three years to leave the school's presidency. She resigned in the second year of her presidency after a closed door meeting with the Board of Visitors in February 2010. Her tenure was not without controversy, including a state investigation into money Hample spent on the president's residence and testing a security-alarm during a campus safety walk.

Academic offices
Preceded by William J. Frawley	8th President of the University of Mary Washington; 2008 – 2010	Succeeded by Richard V. Hurley
Preceded by James H. McCormick	2nd Chancellor of the Pennsylvania State System of Higher Education; 2001 – 2008	Succeeded by John C. Cavanaugh
Preceded by Adam Herbert	7th Chancellor of the Florida Board of Regents; 2001 – 2001	Succeeded by None, Board defunct
