= Daphne Hampson =

English theologian

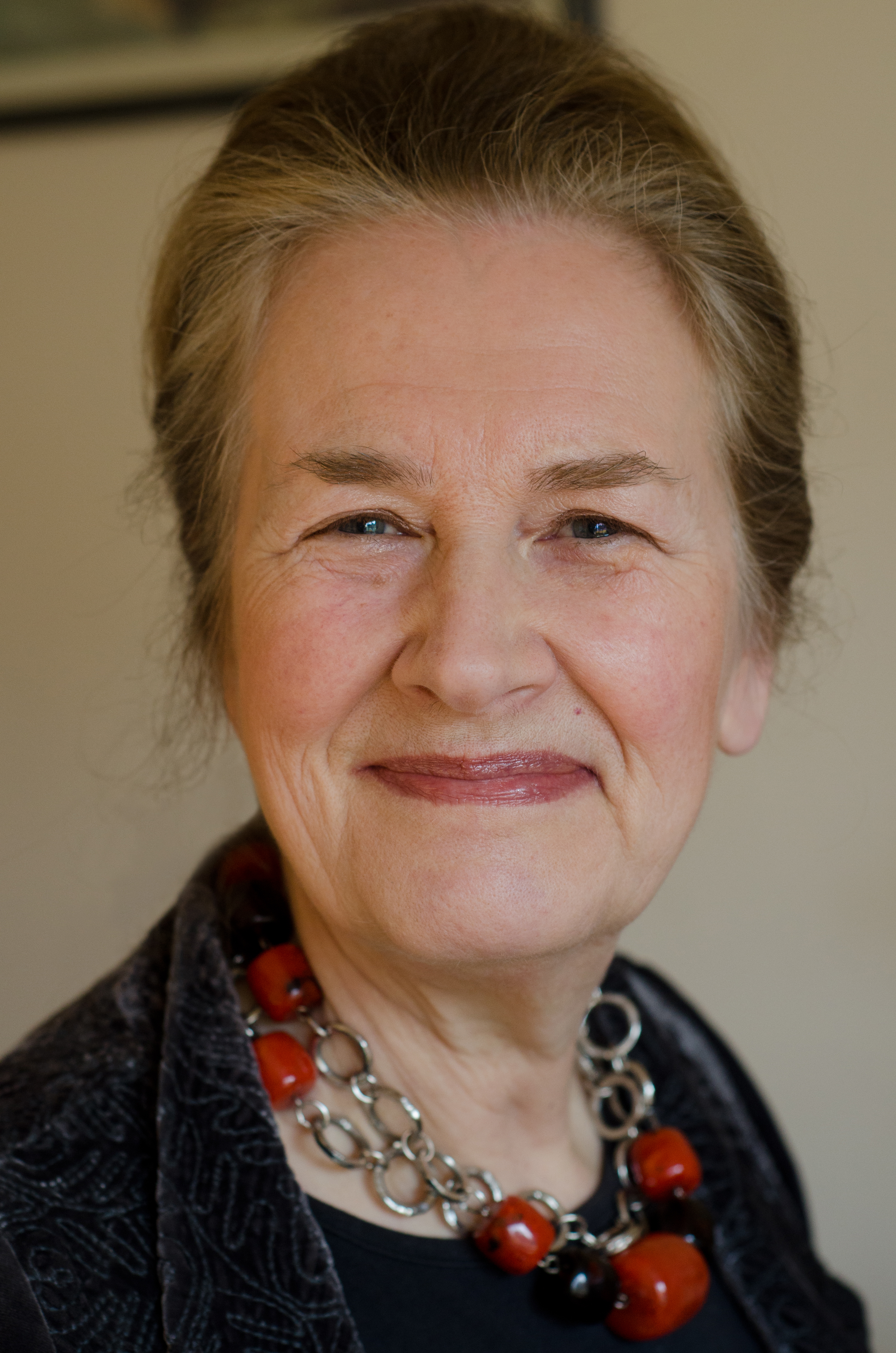
- Born: Margaret Daphne Hampson; 15 June 1944 (age 82); Croydon, England

Academic background
- Education: University of Keele; University of Oxford; Harvard University; University of Warwick
- Thesis: The British Response to the German Church Struggle, 1933–1939 (1974); The Self's Relation to God (1983)
- Influences: Arthur McGill; Friedrich Schleiermacher

Academic work
- Discipline: Theology
- Sub-discipline: Systematic theology
- School or tradition: Feminist theology; postchristianity
- Institutions: University of Stirling; University of St Andrews
- Website: daphnehampson.co.uk

Margaret Daphne Hampson (born 1944) is an English theologian. Educated at Oxford and at Harvard, she held a personal Chair in "Post-Christian Thought" at the University of St Andrews. Hampson's distinctive theological position has both gained her notoriety and been widely influential. Holding that Christianity is neither true nor moral (in not being gender inclusive), she believes the overcoming of patriarchal religion to be fundamental to human emancipation. As a theologian Hampson has always held to a "realist" position, in which the understanding of "that which is God" is based in human religious experience.

== Biography ==
Hampson was born on 15 June 1944 in Croydon, England. Her background was in politics and modern history. Her Oxford doctorate on The British Response to the German Church Struggle, 1933–1939 was not without its impact on her: she was later to write that a Church which discriminated against women was no more to be considered 'Christian' than one that discriminated against non-Aryans. From her early teens she had herself envisaged ordination. Following a year teaching British history, she went to Harvard as a Knox scholar (the second woman ever to enter the advanced degree programme in systematic theology). In 1974 she took up a post at the University of Stirling; from 1977 in theology at the University of St Andrews. Asking for baptism, she was also confirmed in the Anglican Church without being consulted. Now an insider, she took a lead in arguing in fundamental theological terms for the ordination of persons without respect to sex, writing the statement circulated to members of the Synod of the Church of England before the vote in 1979. With a growing feminist consciousness, in 1980 she left the church and, shortly after, Christianity, behind her as incompatible with human equality. It did not however occur to her that she should thereby cease to believe in God: indeed she comments that the move took her back to what essentially had been her formation at home and at her school.

A frequent lecturer and occasional broadcaster, from the 1980s Hampson became known to a wider public. Many in the burgeoning women's movement in the church were challenged, or encouraged, by her thought. She was the first 'iconoclast' in the BBC Radio 4 series of that name. In 1986 she held a major debate with Rosemary Ruether on the compatibility of Christianity with feminism in Westminster Cathedral hall. At St Andrews, Hampson set up one of the first two courses on 'Feminism and Theology' in the UK. From 1985-88 she was the founding president of the European Society of Women in Theological Research, with branches in Eastern and many Western European countries. After taking a degree in Continental philosophy at the University of Warwick in 1992-93, she expanded the range of her teaching at St Andrews to include courses on 'Challenges to Christian Belief', 'Theology and Recent Continental Philosophy' (the first such undergraduate course in the UK) and a cross-disciplinary course in the Faculty of Arts in 'Feminist Theory'. In 2002 she was awarded a personal chair and shortly afterwards, worn out from the situation she had for many years encountered in her job, took early retirement. Hampson has since lived in Oxford, where she is an Associate of the Faculty of Theology, undertaking some teaching and continuing to publish. In 2005 Hampson was a visiting fellow at Clare Hall, Cambridge, and is now a Life Member.

== Thought ==
Hampson is unusual in being both schooled in Continental thought, thus having a post-Kantian, post-Freudian and feminist ideological critique of Christianity, and also a marked British empirical streak, holding that theology should be grounded in human religious experience. It would be misleading to regard her as predominantly a polemical thinker. Rather is her thought characterized by a desire for reasoned judgments as to what can be the case. She is adamant that Christian claims to a unique revelation in Christ are incompatible with what, since the eighteenth century Enlightenment, has been known to be the nature of reality. Hence she contends that the Christian myth must be discarded; while also allowing that it has served as a 'vehicle' which has carried human religious sensibilities. As she points out, a theology which makes no such claim to a particular revelation, in which God is rather conceived as everywhere and at all times available, while expanding a secular Enlightenment paradigm as to what is possible does not contravene the recognition that nature and history form a (non-determinative) causal nexus. She has long taken such an epistemological position for granted. As a 19-year-old on the radio, she challenged a panel as to how the Bible could be considered anything other than literature among other religious literature, the record of people's awareness of God.

Hampson compounds such an epistemological position with an ethical critique of Christianity. From the belief there has been a unique revelation in history it follows that Christians must constantly refer back to that past age. The values and outlook of that patriarchal age, in its constant reiteration, come to form the religious subconscious, affecting present-day relations between men and women. Hampson further finds problematic the idea of a transcendent God; again the corollary of a belief in particular revelation. The relationship to such scripture, or to such a God, must necessarily be heteronomous. At a later date feminist appropriation of G. W. F. Hegel came to be crucial for Hampson's critique of Christianity. Prompted by Luce Irigaray's building on the thought of Ludwig Feuerbach, Hampson came to hold that religious thought-structures are a masculinist projection, both reflecting and serving to legitimise male superordination; and thus a form of fascism. Hampson would have theology become like any other discipline; drawing on the past when that remains appropriate, taking novel directions when the progress of human knowledge or ethics demands this.

The more challenging aspect of Hampson's thought has been to consider (if the Christian myth is to be dismissed), how then 'God' had best be conceptualised. Hampson has always been forthright as to her belief that prayer, or focused thought for another, is effective. It is the conviction that there is such a dimension to reality, Hampson has said, that led her to abandon secular history for theology. 'God', for her, is the name that humans have given to their awareness (anthropomorphising it) of this reality. Hampson holds that God had best be understood as spirit, intimately interconnected with what we are. Drawing on the thought of Schleiermacher and feminist writing, she suggests that a 'porous' and relational understanding of the self may allow us to envisage how humans and 'that which is God' are inter-related. (Whether 'God' has agency, or would exist if humans did not, remain for her open questions.) It is this theological realism which those of more traditional beliefs have often recognised as being held in common. For her part Hampson always insists that the definition of what it is to be Christian necessarily involves an epistemological claim; what is no more than an ethical outlook cannot on its own constitute Christianity.

Academically, Hampson has always been impressed by the power of Lutheran thought, little known or appreciated in the British context. She has found herself over many years existentially involved with the differing (and as she believes incompatible) structures of Lutheran and Catholic thought and their resulting spiritualities; the subject of her Harvard doctorate. She is fascinated by Luther's originality, over-turning philosophical presuppositions inherited from the ancient world and setting theology on another course. Hampson finds the Lutheran tradition best able to respond to the dilemma with which the Enlightenment confronts Christians. From the early 1970s she has been fascinated by the thought of Kierkegaard; in particular his Philosophical Fragments as that text which clarified the necessary clash of Christianity with modernity. Her most recent book is Kierkegaard: Exposition and Critique. Thinking Rudolf Bultmann's position the most adequate attempt to mount an apologetic for Christianity in modernity, she judges it however to fail. Among major theologians, it is Schleiermacher (not a Lutheran) to whom Hampson returns once and again in appreciation.

Speaking at a 1997 UK conference, Hampson summed up her position thus:

I am a Western person, living in a post-Christian age, who has taken something with me from Christian thinkers, but who has rejected the Christian myth. Indeed I want to go a lot further than that. The myth is not neutral; it is highly dangerous. It is a brilliant, subtle, elaborate, male cultural projection, calculated to legitimise a patriarchal world and to enable men to find their way within it. We need to see it for what it is. But for myself I am a spiritual person, not an atheist. I am amazed at this 'other dimension of reality' which there is; which allows healing, extra-sensory perception, and things to fall into place. I am quite clear there is an underlying goodness, beauty and order; that it is powerful, such that we can draw on it, while we are inter-related with it. I call that God.

== Publications ==
- Theology and Feminism, Signposts in Theology, (Oxford: Basil Blackwell, 1990) ISBN 9780631149439
- After Christianity (London: SCM Press, 1996, and Philadelphia, PA: Trinity Press International, 1997.) Second edition, London: SCM Press, 2002. ISBN 9781563381966
- (Ed.) Swallowing a Fishbone? Feminist Theologians Debate Christianity (London: SPCK, 1996). ISBN 9780281049493
- Christian Contradictions: The Structures of Lutheran and Catholic Thought (Cambridge University Press, 2001, paperback 2004).
- Kierkegaard: Exposition and Critique (Oxford University Press, April 2013).

Recent articles:

- 'The Sacred, The Feminine and French Feminist Theory', in eds. G. Pollock and V. Turvey Sauron, The Sacred and the Feminine: Imagination and Difference (London and New York, I. B. Tauris, 2007).
- 'Enlightenment 2008', Caesar: A Journal of Religion and Human Values, vol. 2, no. 2 (Fall 2008).
- 'That Which Is God', in eds. G. Howie and J. Jobling, Women and the Divine: Touching Transcendence (New York: Palgrave Macmillan, 2009).
- 'Kant and the Present', in ed. P. S. Anderson, New Topics in Feminist Philosophy of Religion: Resistance and Spiritual Practices, The Feminist Philosophy Collection (New York: Springer, 2009).
- 'Searching for God?' in eds. M. McGhee and J. Cornwell, Philosophers on God (London and New York: Continuum International Publishing Group, 2009).
- 'Post-Christian Thought', in ed. D. Patte, The Cambridge Dictionary of Christianity (Cambridge University Press, 2010).
- 'Freedom and Human Emancipation', in eds. N. Adams, G. Pattison and G. Ward, Oxford Handbook of Theology and Modern European Thought, Oxford University Press, forthcoming.

== See also ==
- Mary Daly
