= Wanda Warren Berry =

Wanda Warren Berry is an American philosopher and scholar of religion. Her academic work has addressed feminist theology, existentialism, religious ethics, and the philosophy of Danish thinker Søren Kierkegaard. She has helped develop women's studies and feminist approaches to religion.

She retired in 2003 and was named professor emerita. In 2003, she received Colgate University's Sidney J. and Florence Felton French Teaching Award. Berry received the university's Colgate AAUP Professor of the Year award in 2018.

She was married for 55 years to Donald L. Berry, Colgate University professor of religion and Episcopal priest, until his death in January 2013.

== Education ==
Berry received a Bachelor of Arts degree from Boston University in 1954 and a Master of Divinity degree from Yale University in 1957. She earned a PhD from Syracuse University in 1982.

== Academic career ==
Berry began teaching at Colgate University in 1962 as a special instructor in philosophy and religion. She subsequently taught philosophy at Cazenovia College and the State University of New York College at Cortland before returning to Colgate in 1977. Her appointments at Colgate included instructor, assistant professor, and associate professor of philosophy and religion. She retired in 2003 and was named professor emerita.

In addition to teaching philosophy and religion she ran the affirmative action program at Colgate from 1982 to 1985 and again from 1995 to 1997. She also served as director of women's studies from 2003 to 2004.

Berry taught courses in philosophy, religion, women's studies, feminist religious thought, and religious literature. Together with professor Marilyn Thie, she helped develop a curriculum incorporating feminist perspectives and experiences in religious history, which she felt were marginalized. She also helped guide Colgate towards a fully coeducational institution.

Berry served as vice-president/president-elect of the Søren Kierkegaard Society in 1993 and as its president in 1994. She was also involved with the Kierkegaard, Religion, and Culture Group of the American Academy of Religion, serving on its steering committee from 1993 to 1999 and as co-chair from 1997 to 1999.

== Scholarship ==
Berry's published work examines philosophical and religious questions through feminist perspectives. Her research includes the writings of Kierkegaard, feminist theology, religious ethics, and the interpretation of gender in philosophical traditions. Not everyone agreed with her views of Kierkegaard.

In a conference in her honor and that of Marilyn Thie held in 2018, entitled Women and Religion, Philosophy and Feminism held in April 2018, Berry spoke about the difficulties she faced in academia, highlighting the huge increase in women’s opportunities . She stressed the necessity of inclusivity when teaching religion.

Participants, especially those who studied with her, stressed how important her mentorship, particularly feminist mentoring, was in helping them become the scholars they are.

A collection titled Women and Religion, Philosophy and Feminism: The Colgate Heritage in Honor of Professors Marilyn Thie and Wanda Warren Berry, edited by Christopher Vecsey, was published by Colgate University Press in 2019. The volume included contributions by Berry and other scholars and developed from the university's 2018 symposium.

== Publications ==
- "Eternal Feminine or New Woman?" (A Critical Review of Rosemary Radford Ruether's New Woman/New Earth and Sheila Collins' A Different Heaven and Earth), Cross Currents, Fall 1975 (Vol. XXV, No. 3, 309-313).
- The Binocular Vision: The Philosophical and Religious Imagination in W. H. Auden's Critical Essays," Soundings, Summer 1976 (Vol. LIX, No. 2, 164-185).
- "Images of Sin and Salvation in Feminist Theology," Anglican Theological Review, January 1978 (Vol. LX, No. 1, 25-54).
- "Kierkegaard's Existential Dialectic: The Temporal Becoming of the Self", The Journal of Religious Thought, Vol. 38 (Spring-Summer 1981), No. 1, 20-41.
- "Nietzsche's Dialectical Aesthetic in The Birth of Tragedy", Studies in the Humanities, Vol. 9, No. 2 (September 1982), 40-46.
- "Judaism Without Covenant: Breslauer on Buber," Jewish Social Studies, Winter 1983, (Vol. XLV, No. 1, 31-42).
- "The Dialectics of Affirmative Action," The Christian Century, November 30, 1983 (Vol. 100, No. 36, 1106-1110). Reprinted in an abridged version as "Affirmative Action Is Just" in Social Justice: Opposing Viewpoints (St. Paul, MN: Greenhaven Press, 1984).
- "Feminist Theology: The `Verbing' of Ultimate/Intimate Reality in Mary Daly," Ultimate Reality and Meaning: Interdisciplinary Studies in the Philosophy of Understanding, September 1988 (Vol. 11, No. 3, 212-232). Reprinted in Feminist Interpretations of Mary Daly, eds. Sarah Lucia Hoagland and Marilyn Frye (University Park, PAS: The Pennsylvania State University Press, 2000), 27-54.
- "The Alchemy of Forgiveness", Plumbline: A Journal of Ministry in Higher Education, March 1991, (Vol. 19, Issue 1, 20-22).
- "Finally Forgiveness: Kierkegaard as a `Springboard' for a Feminist Theology of Reform" in Foundations of Kierkegaard's Vision of Community: Religion, Ethics, and Politics in Kierkegaard, edited by George B. Connell and C. Stephen Evans (Atlantic Highlands, NJ: Humanities Press, 1992), 196-217.
- "Kierkegaard and Feminism: Apologetic, Repetition, and Dialogue" Kierkegaard in Dialogue, eds. Merold Westphal and Martin Matustik (Bloomington and Indianapolis, Indiana U. Press, 1995), 110-124.
- "The Heterosexual Imagination and Aesthetic Existence in Kierkegaard's Either/Or, Part One", International Kierkegaard Commentary, vol. 3 (Macon, GA: Mercer U. Press, 1995), 201-228. Reprinted in Feminist Interpretations of Kierkegaard, eds. Sylvia Walsh and Céline Léon, (University Park PA: Pennsylvania University Press, 1997) 25-49.
- "Judge William Judging Woman: Essentialism and Existentialism in Kierkegaard's Either/Or, Part Two", International Kierkegaard Commentary, vol. 4 (Macon, GA: Mercer U. Press, 1995), 33-57.
- "The Silent Woman in Kierkegaard's Later Religious Writings," in Feminist Interpretations of Kierkegaard, eds. Sylvia Walsh and Céline Léon (University Park PA: Pennsylvania University Press, 1997) 287-306.
- Review of The Cambridge Companion to Kierkegaard, eds. Alastair Hannay and Gordon Marino (Cambridge University Press, 1998) in The Archiv Fur Geschichte Der Philosophie, 81. Bd., S. 349-351 Walter de Gruster 1999.
- “The Wreath of Eternity: Marriage as Paradigm of Covenant Love in Kierkegaard and Buber,” International Kierkegaard Commentary, volume 10 on Three Discourses on Imagined Occasions, ed. Robert L Perkins (Macon, GA: Mercer U. Press, 2006) 289-320.
- “Practicing Liberation: Feminist and Womanist Dialogues with Kierkegaard’s Practice in Christianity,” International Kierkegaard Commentary, volume 20, ed. Robert L Perkins (Macon, GA: Mercer U. Press, 2004) 303-341.
- “To Be the Truth Is the Only True Explanation of What Truth Is: Gilleleie and the Twenty-First Century,” Why Kierkegaard Matters: A Festschrift in Honor of Robert L. Perkins, eds. Marc A Jolley & Edmon L. Rowell, Jr, (Macon, GA: Mercer University Press, 2010) 17-37.

== Other activities ==
In addition to her academic work she volunteered in a local hospice and provided tutoring in the Madison County Reads Ahead program. She was also involved in local Democratic Committee politics, She was also involved with New Yorkers for Verified Voting, an organization concerned with election technology and voting-system integrity, serving on its board and as executive director.
