= Troy Paino =

American academic

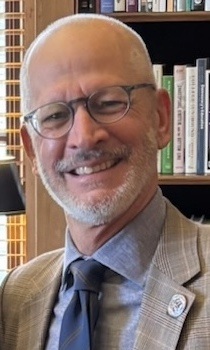
- Paino in 2025

10th President of the University of Mary Washington
- Incumbent
- Assumed office July 2016
- Preceded by: Richard V. Hurley

16th President of Truman State University
- In office May 2010 – June 2016
- Preceded by: Darrell Krueger
- Succeeded by: Susan L. Thomas

Personal details
- Born: December 28, 1962 (age 63)
- Spouse: Kelly Paino
- Children: 2
- Education: Evangel University (BA); Indiana University Robert H. McKinney School of Law (JD); Michigan State University (MA, PhD)

Troy D. Paino (born December 28, 1962) is an American lawyer and academic administrator serving as the president at the University of Mary Washington (UMW). Prior to coming to UMW, Paino served for six years as president of Truman State University in Kirksville, Missouri. Previously, he was Truman State's provost and vice president for academic affairs, and he also served as dean of Winona State University's College of Liberal Arts.

== Early life and education ==
Paino earned his bachelor's degree in history and philosophy from Evangel University in Springfield, Missouri, his Juris Doctor from the Indiana University Robert H. McKinney School of Law, and his master's and doctorate in American studies from Michigan State University. His 1997 Ph.D. thesis was "The end of nostalgia: a cultural history of Indiana high school basketball during the Progressive Era."

== Career ==
Prior to his work in academia, Paino worked for three years in private legal practice. He has served on the history faculties of Winona State University, Truman State University and the University of Mary Washington. His book, The Social History of the United States: 1960s, was published in 2008.

Paino served as President of Truman State University from May 2010 to June 2016. While at Truman, he created several humorous videos that gained national attention from forums like Good Morning America, Right This Minute, and The Huffington Post.
