= Richard V. Hurley =

Richard V. Hurley (born May 19, 1947) was the ninth president of the University of Mary Washington.

Formerly executive vice president and chief financial officer at UMW, Hurley was appointed acting president on April 1, 2010, following Judy Hample’s resignation. He officially was appointed the university's ninth president by the Board of Visitors on July 1, 2010.

From May 1, 2007, through June 30, 2008, Hurley held the positions of acting president and vice president while the university was in a period of presidential transition. Hurley established Fredericksburg's Town and Gown Committee. He serves as a director of the Fredericksburg Regional Chamber of Commerce and as a member of the board of the Rappahannock United Way, the Fredericksburg Regional Alliance and Virginia Partners Bank.

Prior to arriving at Mary Washington in 2000, Hurley served as vice president for administration and finance at Longwood University. A native of New Jersey, Hurley earned a Bachelor of Science in environmental studies from Stockton University and a Master of Arts in public administration from Central Michigan University. He has received certificates and diplomas from the University of Kentucky and Harvard University.

Hurley lived with his wife, Rose, in Brompton, a historic university property adjacent to the University of Mary Washington Fredericksburg campus.

In 2015, Hurley announced his intention to retire on June 30, 2016.
