= Cenchreae (Argolis) =

Town in ancient Argolis

Coordinates: 37°32′51″N 22°36′32″E

Cenchreae or Kenchreai (Ancient Greek: Κεγχρεαί), also Cenchreiae or Kenchreiai (Κεγχρειαί), was a town in ancient Argolis, south of Argos, and on the road from the latter city to Tegea. Pausanias says that it was to the right of the Trochus (τρόχος), a carriage road leading to Lerna. Near Cenchreae Pausanias saw the sepulchral monuments of the Argives, who conquered the Lacedaemonians at Hysiae. The site is located near present-day Palaio Skafidaki.
