= David Cain (professor) =

American theologian (1941–2021)

David William Cain (November 5, 1941 - July 31, 2021) was a professor emeritus of religion at the University of Mary Washington and past president of the Søren Kierkegaard Society of North America. He chaired plenary sessions on and authored books about Søren Kierkegaard. He lectured in Christian theology and edited, compiled, and preserved the work of the late Harvard theologian Arthur Chute McGill, three volumes of which are available in new editions. He was also an ordained minister of the United Church of Christ. On July 31, 2021, David William Cain died at the age of 79 after a lengthy illness.

== Early life ==
David Cain was born in St. Louis, Missouri, on November 5, 1941, to William and Lura (Howe) Cain. He received his A.B. from Princeton University. After a year of study at King’s College in London on a Fulbright scholarship, Cain attended Yale Divinity School where he completed a master of divinity degree. While at Yale, Cain met and married his wife Marlyne. The couple returned to Princeton where he completed his M.A. and Ph.D in systematic theology.

== Career ==
In 1970, joining the faculty of what was then Mary Washington College, David Cain became a founding member of the Department of Classics, Philosophy and Religion. His career spanned 44 years until his retirement as Distinguished Professor of Religion in 2014. Cain received the Grellet C Simpson Award for Excellence in Undergraduate Teaching.

== Publications ==
- David Cain. (1997) An Evocation of Kierkegaard/En Fremkaldelse af Kierkegaard. Copenhagen: C. A. Reitzel. ISBN 87-7876-010-0
- David Cain (1978) Reckoning with Kierkegaard: Christian Faith and Dramatic Literature. Princeton University: University Microfilms International. ASIN: B0006WO4S6
- David W. Cain. (1986). Freedom : the Condition of Faith. Fredericksburg, Va.: Thomas Jefferson Institute for the Study of Religious Freedom.
- David Cain (Editor) (2007) "Sermons Of Arthur C. McGill: Theological Fascinations Volume One" Cascade Books: A Division of Wipf & Stock Publishers. ISBN 1-59752-917-6. ISBN 978-1-59752-917-4

An Evocation of Kierkegaard is an illustrated book about the world of Søren Kierkegaard. It is not a biography, rather a book about Kierkegaard in Copenhagen and the rest of Denmark. The book is a result of Cain's Kierkegaard pilgrimage in 1984. David Cain himself called his book a "coffee-table Kierkegaard" and it offers a contemporary view of Kierkegaard's Copenhagen.
