= Shin Fujiyama =

Japanese–American philanthropist (born 1984)

- Born: September 16, 1983 (age 43); Kanagawa, Japan
- Education: University of Mary Washington
- Occupation: Philanthropist
- Years active: 2006–present
- Employer: Students Helping Honduras
- Title: Executive Director

Shin Fujiyama (Japanese: 藤山 慎, September 19,1983 - ) is a Japanese American philanthropist who co-founded Students Helping Honduras in 2007 with his sister Cosmo Fujiyama after visiting Honduras on a service learning trip for the first time.

Fujiyama was born in Kanagawa Prefecture, a small fishing village in Japan. He graduated from the University of Mary Washington in Fredericksburg, Virginia in 2007 with a Bachelor's degree in International Affairs and pre-medicine. Shin speaks four languages fluently: Japanese, English, Spanish, and Portuguese. He opened a YouTube channel in 2020, showing his daily life in Honduras, initially for his family and friends in the US, but it became very popular in Honduras, making him a recognizable figure in the country.

In 2023, he decided to run 125 km from the frontier with Guatemala to San Pedro Sula. He achieved this between 13 and 17 July 2023. He raised funds from this run for his project to create 1000 schools in Honduras. In April 2024, he decided to run between San Pedro and the capital of Tegucigalpa, a distance of 250 km. On July 4, 2024, he announced that his next run would be 3,000 km from the border between Mexico and the United States, finishing in San Pedro Sula, running a marathon a day.

He was included as a "young wonder" in the 2009 edition of the CNN Heroes television special.
