= Fujiyama Station =

Former railway station in Rumoi, Hokkaido, Japan

Fujiyama Station 藤山駅
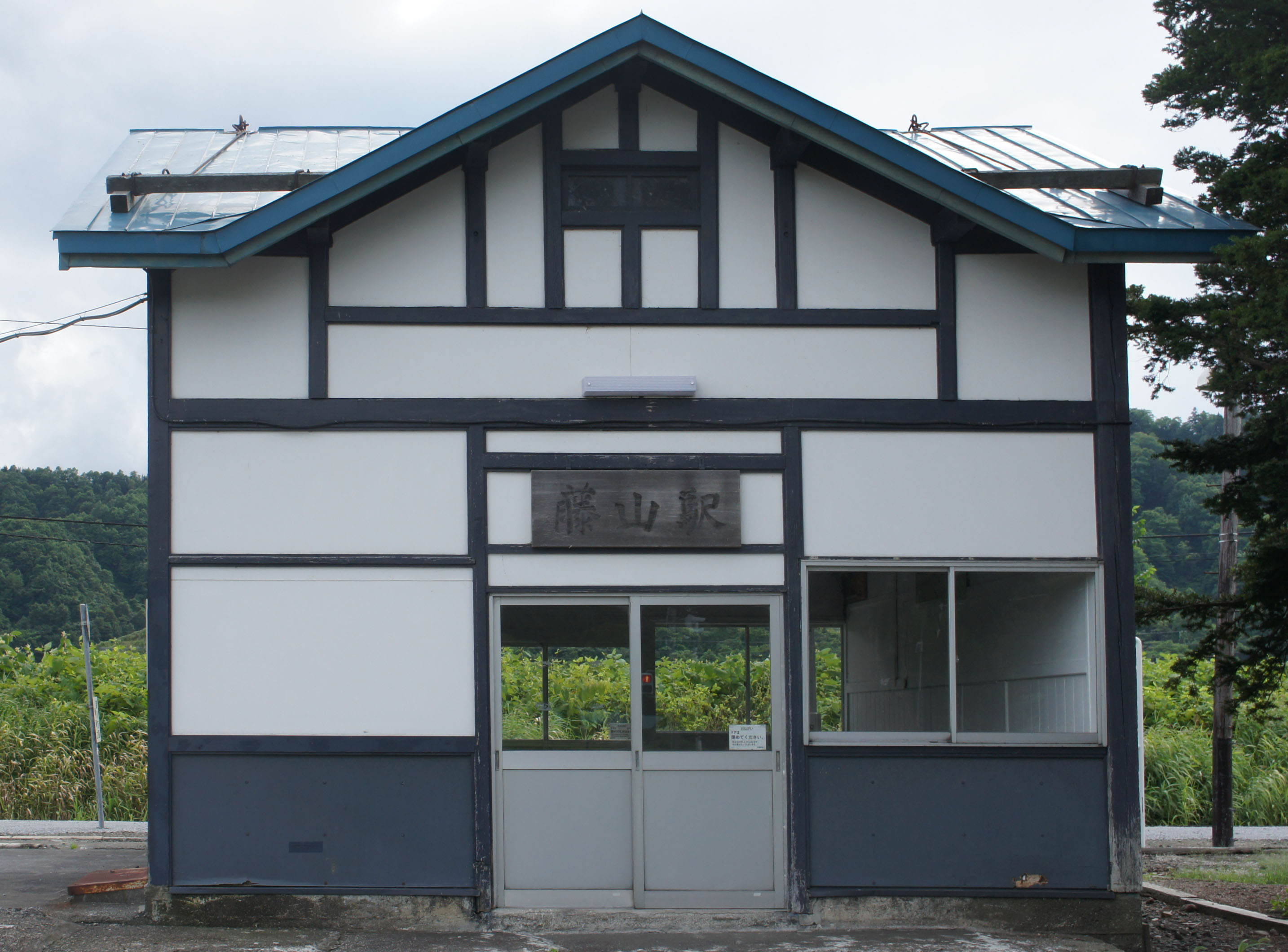

General information
- Location: Rumoi, Hokkaidō; Japan
- Coordinates: 43°53′13″N 141°43′15″E
- Operated by: Hokkaido Railway Company
- Line: Rumoi Main Line
Location

Fujiyama Station (藤山駅, Fujiyama-eki) was a train station in Rumoi, Hokkaidō, Japan.

The station closed on 1 April 2023 owing to poor patronage.

== Lines ==
- Hokkaido Railway Company
  - Rumoi Main Line

== Adjacent stations ==
«	Service	»
Rumoi Main Line
Horonuka	Local	Ōwada
