= Form (religion) =

In academic discussions of organized religion, the term form is sometimes used to describe prescriptions or norms on religious practice.

== Christian forms ==
Forms in Christianity are mostly familiarly dictates of church authority or tradition (e.g. church government, liturgy, doctrine). However, the term is used by some authors to refer to a broader category that includes other patterns of religious practice.

Most notably, Christian scholar D. G. Hart uses this term to compare and contrast the practices of evangelical Protestants and what he calls "confessional Protestants" (for example Anglicans and most Lutherans). He argues that the confessionals follow forms that are dictated by church authority or tradition, and calls these forms churchly forms. On the other hand, noting the resistance to such central authority and tradition among evangelicals, he labels the forms of these denominations parachurchly forms, as they are often dictated by parachurch organizations and other influences beyond the direct control of any particular church.

There is little debate over whether confessional Protestants use forms. However, whether similar devices are used by evangelicals is hotly contested. Much of the opposition comes from within evangelicalism itself, due to the antiritualistic tendencies of many denominations. Other scholars of religion have however noted the tendency toward certain accepted patterns in religious practice. Robert Oden notes that this is true of nearly all religions, not just Christianity, and that it is true even of those movements that claim to be antiritualistic.

If then we accept the broader usage of the word "form", there are a number of other forms besides the ones noted above. These include the products of what has, perhaps cynically, been called "Christian entrepreneurship", such as contemporary Christian music (and non-denominational praise songs), Christian T-shirts, and non-denominational book and video resources.
