= Richard Longstreth =

American architectural historian

Richard W. Longstreth (born 4 March 1946, Pasadena) is an architectural historian and a professor at George Washington University where he directs the program in historic preservation.

Longstreth received an A.B. in architecture from the University of Pennsylvania in 1968, and a Ph.D. in architectural history from the University of California, Berkeley in 1977. He taught at Kansas State University before joining the George Washington University faculty in 1983.

Longstreth's career has focused in two areas: architectural history and historic preservation. His early scholarly work focused on the late nineteenth century architects of the San Francisco Bay Area and led to his book On the Edge of the World: Four Architects in San Francisco at the Turn of the Century (1983), but more recently he has focused on architecture in relationship to the decentralization of American cities. His book, City Center to Regional Mall: Architecture, the Automobile, and Retailing in Los Angeles, 1920–1950, won the 1997 Abbott Lowell Cummings Award from the Vernacular Architecture Forum, the 1997 Lewis Mumford Prize of the Society for American City and Regional Planning History, and the 1999 Spiro Kostof Award of the Society of Architectural Historians. His 1999 book, The Drive-In, the Supermarket, and the Transformation of Commercial Space in Los Angeles, 1914–1941, won the University of Mary Washington Center for Historic Preservation Book Prize in 2000.

Longstreth has also been deeply involved in historic preservation both as teacher and as activist and consultant. He has taken an active role in preservation efforts in the Washington, D.C., area.

Longstreth has served as president of the Society of Architectural Historians. He has chaired the Maryland Governor's Consulting Committee on the National Register of Historic Places. He was first vice president of the Vernacular Architecture Forum in 1989-91, has been a trustee of the National Building Museum, and has served as a board member of Preservation Action.

== Books ==
- Longstreth, Richard, A Guide to Architecture in the Adirondacks, Adirondack Architectural Heritage, Keeseville, New York 2017, ISBN 978-0-96-703885-8
- Longstreth, Richard (editor), The Charnley House: Louis Sullivan, Frank Lloyd Wright, and the Making of Chicago's Gold Coast, University of Chicago Press, Chicago and London 2004, ISBN 0-226-49274-5
- Longstreth, Richard, The Drive-In, the Supermarket, and the Transformation of Commercial Space in Los Angeles, 1914–1941, MIT Press, Cambridge MA and London 1999, ISBN 0-262-12214-6
- Longstreth, Richard, History on the Line: Testimony in the Cause of Preservation, Historic Urban Plans, Ithaca NY 1998, ISBN 0-9662723-0-7
- Longstreth, Richard, City Center to Regional Mall: Architecture, the Automobile, and Retailing in Los Angeles, 1920-1950, MIT Press, Cambridge MA and London 1997, ISBN 0-262-12200-6
- Longstreth, Richard (editor), The Mall in Washington, 1791–1991, National Gallery of Art, Washington DC 1991
- Longstreth, Richard, The Buildings of Main Street: A Guide to American Commercial Architecture, Preservation Press, Washington DC 1987; rev. ed. AltaMira Press, Walnut Creek CA 2000, ISBN 0-7425-0279-1
- Longstreth, Richard, On the Edge of the World: Four Architects in San Francisco at the Turn of the Century, Architectural History Foundation, New York, and MIT Press, Cambridge MA and London 1983; paperback ed., 1989; reprint ed., University of California Press, Berkeley 1998, ISBN 0-520-21415-3
