= University of Mary Washington =

Public college in Fredericksburg, Virginia, US

- Former names: State Normal and Industrial School for Women at Fredericksburg (1908–1938); Mary Washington College (1938–1944; 1972–2004); Mary Washington College of the University of Virginia (1944–1972)
- Motto: Pro Deo Domo Patria (Latin)
- Motto in English: "For God, Home, and Country"
- Type: Public liberal arts university
- Established: 1908; 118 years ago
- Accreditation: SACS
- Academic affiliations: COPLAC; SCHEV
- Endowment: $77.6 million (2023)
- President: Troy Paino
- Provost: Tim O'Donnell
- Faculty: 386
- Administrative staff: 644
- Students: 4,108
- Undergraduates: 3,834
- Postgraduates: 274
- Location: Fredericksburg, Virginia, United States; 38°18′07″N 77°28′30″W
- Campus: 176 acres (0.71 km^{2}); Midsize suburb
- Other campuses: Dahlgren
- Newspaper: "The Weekly Ringer"
- Colors: Navy blue and gray
- Nickname: Eagles
- Sporting affiliations: NCAA Division III – C2C; CLC
- Mascot: Sammy D. Eagle
- Website: umw.edu
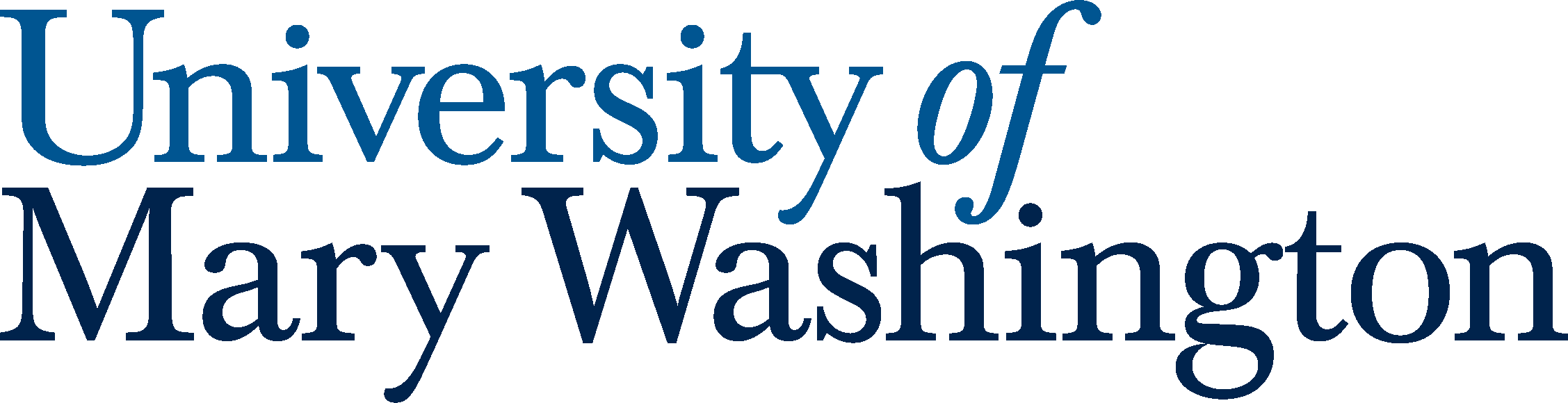

- Location in northern Virginia Location in Virginia Location in United States

University of Mary Washington (UMW) is a public liberal arts university in Fredericksburg, Virginia. Established in 1908 as the State Normal and Industrial School for Women at Fredericksburg, the institution later became known as Fredericksburg Teachers College, and was named Mary Washington College in 1938 after Mary Ball Washington, mother of the first president of the United States, George Washington. The General Assembly of Virginia changed the college's name to University of Mary Washington in 2004 to reflect the addition of graduate and professional programs to the central undergraduate curriculum, as well as the establishment of more than one campus. The university offers more than 60 graduate and undergraduate degree programs in three colleges: Arts and Sciences, Business, and Education.

== History ==
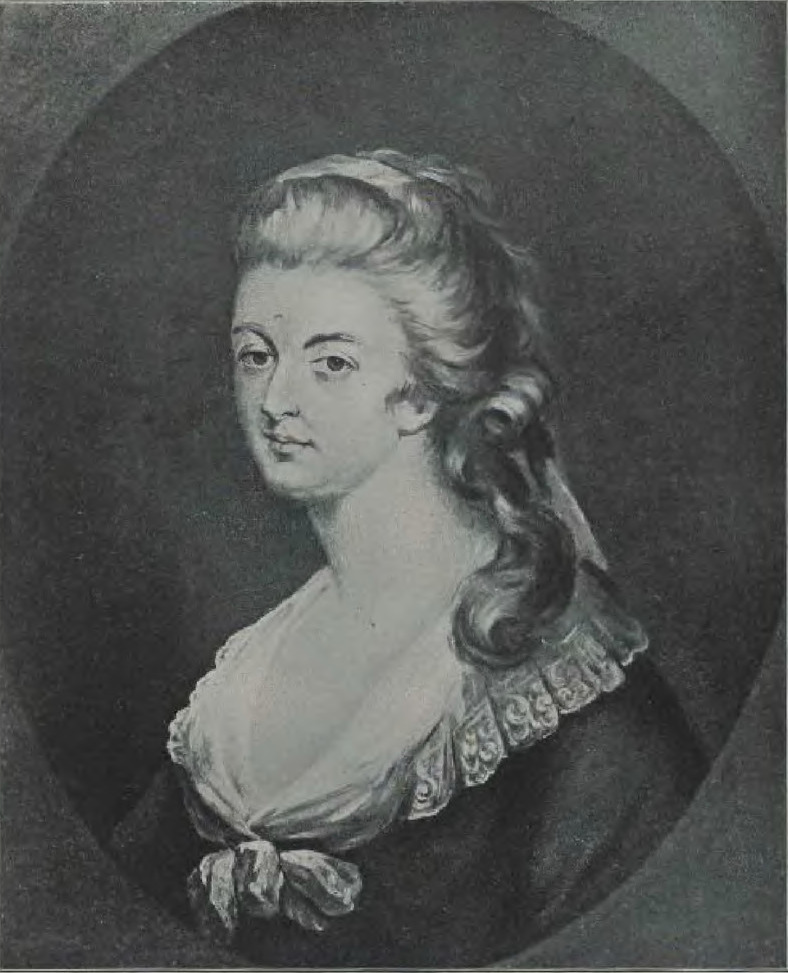
Mary Ball Washington (1708–1789), the mother of President George Washington and the namesake of the university.

On March 14, 1908, Virginia governor Claude A. Swanson signed into law legislation for the establishment of the new State Normal and Industrial School for Women. It was called Fredericksburg Teachers College. The institution was renamed Mary Washington College in 1938 after Mary Ball Washington, mother of the first president of the United States of America, George Washington, and longtime resident of Fredericksburg.

In 1944 the college became associated with the University of Virginia as its women's college. Until that time, the University of Virginia had not admitted women as undergraduates, except in its education and nursing programs, although its postgraduate programs were coeducational. Following UVA's transition to coeducational status in 1970, the Virginia General Assembly reorganized Mary Washington College in 1972 as a separate, coeducational institution.

In 1988, the University's Center for Historic Preservation established the Historic Preservation Book Prize, awarded annually by a jury of preservation academics and professionals to the book with the most potential for breaking new ground and positively impacting the discipline of historic preservation in the United States. Since that time, the Prize has gone to David Lowenthal, Roy Rosenzweig, Elizabeth Blackmar, Mike Wallace, Richard Longstreth, Francoise Astorg Bollack, Catherine Fleming Bruce (the first African-American awardee) and Thomas Hubka, among others.

The General Assembly of Virginia enacted legislation changing the college's name to University of Mary Washington on March 19, 2004, to reflect the addition of master's degree programs and the establishment of more than one campus.

The university's first LEED-certified building, CGPS North Building, was built in 2007. The university houses stops along the route of the Fredericksburg Regional Transit System (FRED). The school signed an Energy Performance Contract with the energy service company NORESCO from 2005 to 2007, enabling the campus to install water saving devices which reduced campus water consumption by 50%. NORESCO also installed low energy light fixtures, occupant sensors, HVAC controls, and completed replacement of leaking condensate piping.

== Academics ==
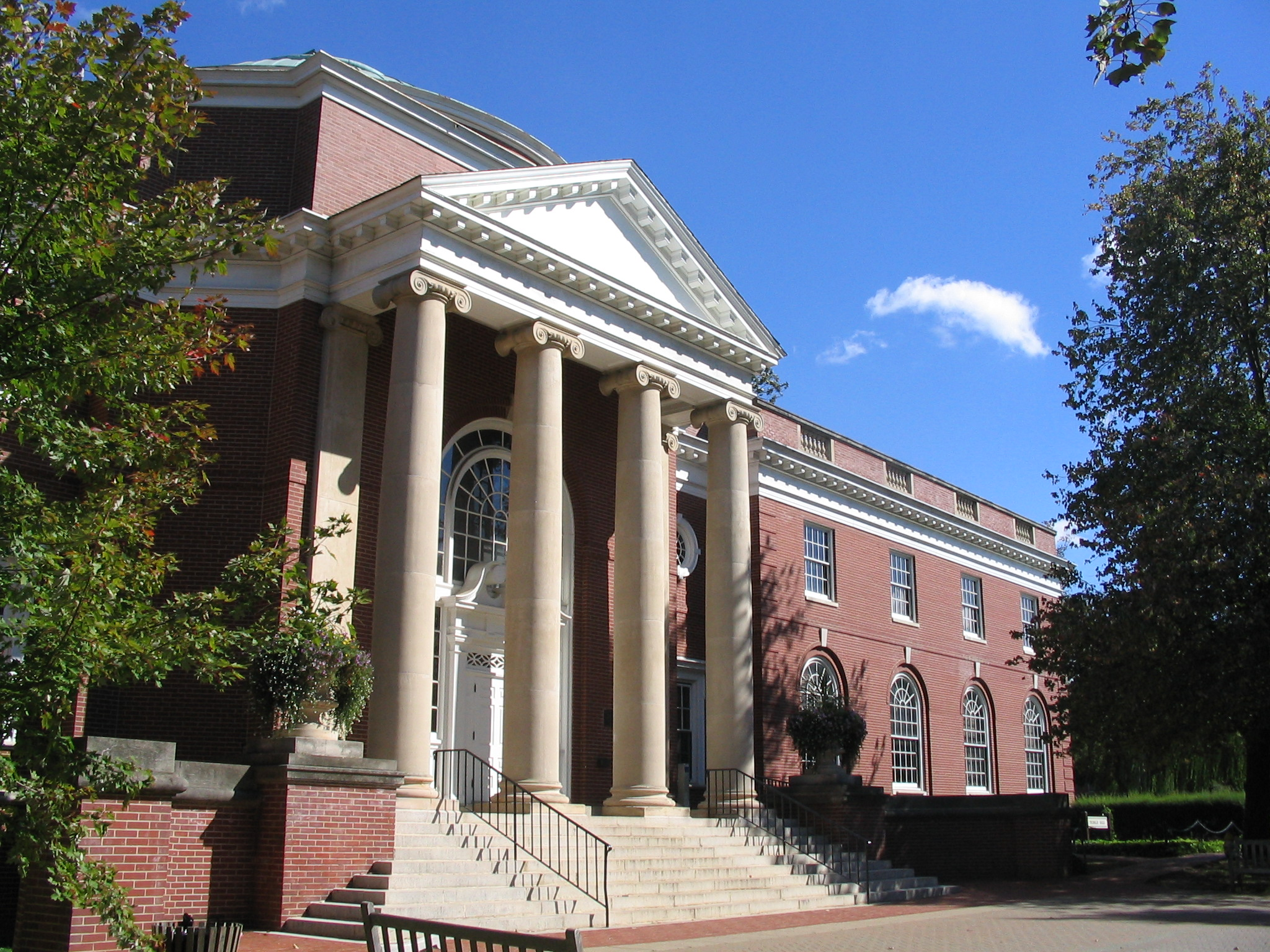
Once the library, James Farmer Hall features a rotunda. Today, it houses the Classics Philosophy and Religion, Mathematics, and Computer Science departments

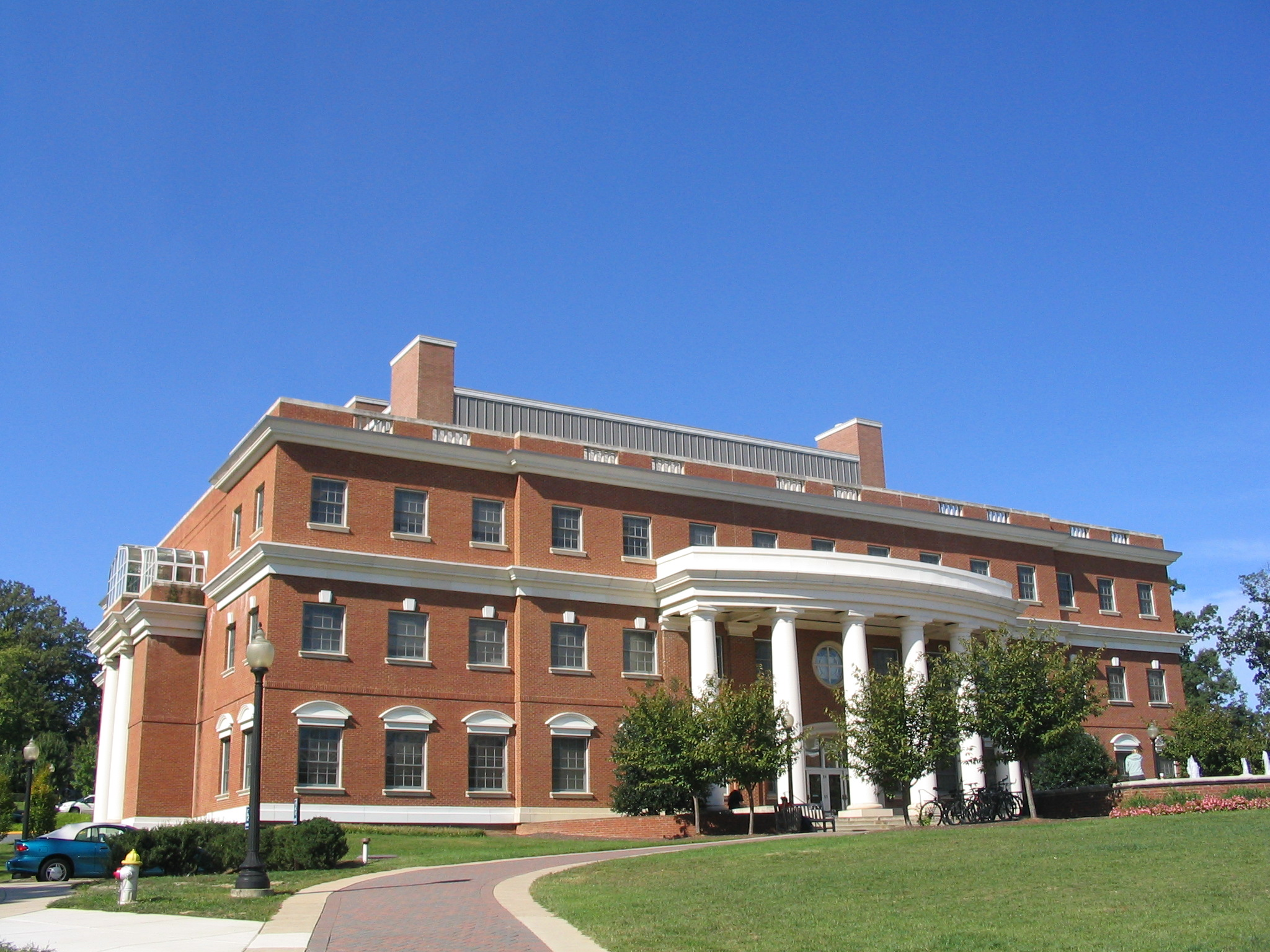
The Jepson Science Center houses the Physics, Chemistry, and Biology departments, among others.

University of Mary Washington is a public liberal arts university accredited by the Southern Association of Colleges and Schools.

UMW has five pre-professional programs: pre-dental, pre-law, pre-med, pre-pharmacy, and pre-veterinary. Bachelor's degrees include a Bachelor of Science, Bachelor of Arts, and Bachelor of Science in Business Administration in addition to two degree completion programs – a Bachelor of Science in Nursing (BSN) and a Bachelor of Liberal Studies (BLS). Master's degrees include a Master of Business Administration (MBA), Master of Education (M.Ed.), Master of Education for Professional Development or Added Endorsement (M.Ed.), Master of Science in Elementary Education (M.S.) and a Master of Geospatial Analysis (MSGA). UMW also offers a Geographic Information Science certificate.

== Campus ==
Much of UMW's Fredericksburg campus is located on Marye's Heights, a steep hill which, like Sunken Road (the campus' northeastern boundary), played an important role in the 1862 Battle of Fredericksburg. The campus is within walking distance to the historic downtown with shops, restaurants and the Rappahannock River. Other campuses are Stafford Campus, seven miles north of Fredericksburg, and Dahlgren Campus, near the Naval Surface Warfare Center Dahlgren Division.

== Administration ==
By statute of the Code of Virginia, University of Mary Washington is governed by a Board of Visitors, one member of which is elected every two years to serve as Rector. The UMW Board of Visitors is composed of twelve members appointed by the Governor of Virginia and confirmed by the General Assembly. At least six members of the Board must be alumni of the university, and no more than three may be nonresidents of Virginia. Each member serves a term of four years and may be eligible for reappointment to one successive term.

Troy Paino arrived at UMW July 1, 2016 as its tenth and current president. Prior to coming to UMW, Paino served for six years as president of Truman State University in Kirksville, Missouri.

=== Past presidents ===
- Edward H. Russell (1908–1919)
- Algernon B. Chandler, Jr. (1919–1928)
- Morgan L. Combs (1929–1955)
- Grellet C. Simpson (1956–1974)
- Prince B. Woodard (1974–1982)
- William M. Anderson Jr. (1983–2006)
- William J. Frawley (2006–2007)
- Judy G. Hample (2008–2010)
- Richard V. Hurley (2010–2016)
- Troy D. Paino (2016–present)

== Student life ==
Undergraduate demographics as of Fall 2023
Race and ethnicity	Total
White	60%
Hispanic	13%
Black	8%
Unknown	7%
Asian	5%
Two or more races	5%
International student	2%
Economic diversity
Low-income (Note: The percentage of students who received an income-based federal Pell grant intended for low-income students.)	20%
Affluent (Note: The percentage of students who are a part of the American middle class at the bare minimum.)	80%

=== Traditions ===
UMW has many traditions on campus. Honor Convocation is held at the start of each academic year for incoming freshman, where they first sign the school's Honor Pledge. Similarly, Eagle Gathering is a candlelit celebration on Ball Circle that marks the start of the year and officially welcomes the newest class to UMW. Club Carnival occurs on the first week of the semester, where clubs showcase themselves for prospective members. Later in the fall semester UMW has its Family Weekend, typically held in the fall semester, where families visit the campus to get a taste of student life through events, performances and tours. Spirit Week is a series of student events that lead up to Homecoming and the return of UMW alumni to the university for athletic contests and tailgating. Senior Countdown is an event that celebrates 100 days until graduation for the undergraduate class.

In the spring semester, UMW hosts its Multicultural Fair, where it has performances, events, and global cuisines. Most notably, towards the end of the semester, UMW holds "Devil-Goat Day" where members of the Devils (students who graduate in an odd numbered year) and Goats (those who graduate in even numbered years) compete in carnival-style games on Ball Circle. The Spring Formal is an annual formal dance held in April, where students learn the location of the formal—unique each year—only once they are on the buses heading over. Mr. UMW is a unique talent show in which contestants perform to be named "Mr. UMW" by the end of the night. WMWC is the school's unlicensed student run campus radio station.

=== Athletics ===
UMW Athletics' 23 teams compete in the NCAA Division III Coast to Coast Athletic Conference. Known as the UMW Eagles, 308 of these student-athletes have been named to All-American teams. The university's women's rugby team won the 2014 USA Rugby Division II National Championship. UMW's men's rugby team won the USA Rugby's D1AA Fall Championship in 2017. The UMW ultimate frisbee teams have both made names for themselves as national contenders. The men's team, Mother of George, competed for the USAU Division III College National Championship in the spring of 2018 and fall of 2021, while the women's team, Mary Massacre, qualified for the Championship in the spring seasons of 2011, 2012, 2013, 2019, and 2022. The men's basketball team won the NCAA Division III national championship in 2026.

== Rankings ==
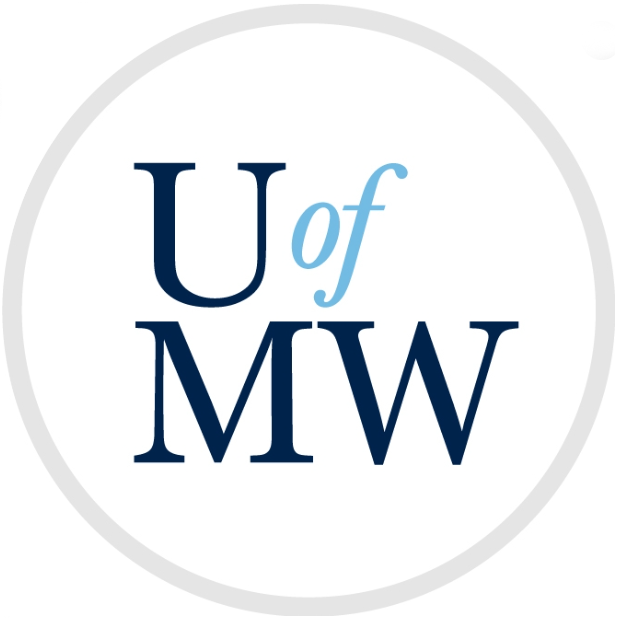
Logo

In 2018, Peace Corps named UMW was a Top Volunteer-Producing Colleges and Universities for the tenth year in a row, ranking it fourth among small schools. A total of 261 UMW alumni have served in the Peace Corps since the agency's founding in 1961. UMW became a Peace Corps Prep Program partner in 2017.

UMW was ranked among the top 382 colleges in the nation by The Princeton Review, which featured UMW in its 2018 issue of "The Best 382 Colleges."

UMW was ranked 154th in National Liberal Arts by the U.S. News & World Report's 2024 college rankings

In 2017, the school's debate team was ranked 43rd by the Cross Examination Debate Association. In 2009, the team ranked third overall in the National Debate Tournament.

== Notable people ==
=== Alumni ===
- Eric Axelson, musician
- Karen Olsen Beck, former First Lady of Costa Rica
- Marguerite Bennett, comic book writer
- Jesse Benton, conservative political activist and consultant
- Marion Blakey, CEO of Rolls-Royce and former Federal Aviation Administration Administrator
- Matt Bradshaw, musician
- Mark Cole, Virginia politician
- Frances D. Cook, former U.S. Ambassador to Burundi, former U.S. Ambassador to Cameroon, former U.S. Ambassador to Oman
- Teresa A. H. Djuric, U.S. Air Force Brigadier General
- Jean Donovan, relief worker martyred in El Salvador
- Elizabeth Edwards, activist and wife of John Edwards
- Janet Doub Erickson, artist and author, founder of the Blockhouse of Boston
- Shin Fujiyama, co-founder of Students Helping Honduras
- Barbara Halliday, Mayor of Hayward, California
- Carolyn Kreiter-Foronda, Poet Laureate of Virginia, 2006–2008
- Rose M. Likins, former U.S. Ambassador to El Salvador, former U.S. Ambassador to Peru
- Robert Wood Lynn, writer and winner of Yale Younger Poets Prize
- Michèle McQuigg, Virginia politician
- Judy Muller, journalist
- Nan Grogan Orrock, Georgia politician
- Toddy Puller, Virginia politician
- Joey Peppersack, Paralympic swimmer, represented United States at 2020 Paralympic Games
- Judge Reinhold, actor
- Anne Rudloe, marine biologist, environmentalist
- Maggie Stiefvater, writer
- Desiree Marie Velez, actress
- David Whitaker, Arkansas politician
- Christopher C. Rogers, co-creator of Halt and Catch Fire

=== Current, former, and emeritus faculty ===
- Bulent Atalay, physicist and author
- Julien Binford, artist
- David Cain, theologian
- Gaetano Cecere, sculptor
- Elizabeth A. Clark, scholar
- Claudia Emerson, poet
- James Farmer (1985–1999), a leader of the Civil Rights Movement
- Ron Smith, poet
- Frank M. Snowden, Jr., scholar
- Gregory Stanton, founder and president of Genocide Watch
- Laura Sumner, numismatist
