= Agnes Weinrich =

American visual artist (1873–1946)

- Born: July 16, 1873; Des Moines County, Iowa, US
- Died: April 17, 1946 (aged 72); Provincetown, Massachusetts, US
- Resting place: Trinity Cemetery, Mount Union, Iowa
- Education: Art Students League, Art Institute of Chicago, and Charles Hawthorne in Provincetown
- Known for: Modern art
- Movement: Cubism; abstract art

Agnes Weinrich (July 16, 1873 – April 17, 1946) was an American visual artist. In the early twentieth century, she played a critical role in introducing cubist theory to American artists, collectors, and the general public and became one of the first American abstractionists. A life-long proponent of modernist art, she was an active participant in the art communities of Provincetown and New York. Early in her career, she traveled widely in Europe and spent extended periods studying in Paris and Berlin. She also studied art in Chicago, Provincetown, and New York. During most of her career, she worked in a Provincetown studio during the warm months and a Manhattan studio during the cold ones. Weinrich's easel work included oil paintings, watercolors, and pastels. She also made block prints and etchings and drew using pencil and crayon. Her paintings, prints, and drawings appeared in solo and group exhibitions throughout her career and she received favorable critical attention both during her life and after her death.

== Career in art ==
=== Early life and education ===
Agnes Weinrich was born on July 16, 1873, on a prosperous farm in southeast Iowa. Her father and mother were German immigrants and German was the language spoken at home. Following her mother's death in 1879, she was raised by her father, Christian Weinrich. After retiring in 1894, he moved his household, including Agnes and two siblings, to nearby Burlington, Iowa. There, Agnes attended the Burlington Collegiate Institute from which she graduated in 1897. In May 1898, Weinrich and her sister Helen, then called Lena, traveled to Germany with their aunt, a German-born music teacher named Rose Werthmueller. When Werthmueller returned home, they stayed on, living in Berlin with German relatives.

While in Germany, Helen took advanced classes in violin and piano and Agnes studied art. A year after their arrival, their father died leaving them an inheritance that proved to be sufficient to sustain them for the rest of their lives. In 1904, the sisters returned to the United States and settled for two years in Springfield, Illinois, where Helen taught piano in public schools and Agnes painted in a rented studio. In May 1905, Agnes won prizes in an exhibition held by the Illinois State Fair for the drawings and oil paintings she showed. Later that year, the two moved to Chicago where Agnes studied at the School of the Art Institute of Chicago under John Vanderpoel, Nellie Walker, Frederick W. Freer, and Ralph Clarkson.

In 1909, Agnes and Helen returned to Berlin and traveled from there to Munich, where Agnes studied painting under Julius Exter and took a short course in etching. They then traveled to Rome, Florence, and Venice before returning to Chicago in October 1910. In 1913, they traveled to Europe for the third, and last time. They spent a year in Paris, where they made friends with American artists and musicians in the local art scene. According to one writer, the work Agnes produced at this time was skillful but unoriginal—drawings, etching, and paintings in the dominant academic and impressionist styles.

=== Studio in Provincetown ===
On her return from Europe in 1914, Weinrich continued to study art. She and Helen split the year between Provincetown and Manhattan. In Provincetown, she became a member of the Provincetown Printers art colony and attended classes at Charles Hawthorne's Cape Cod School of Art. In New York, she studied at the Art Students League. In 1914, Hawthorne and other artists established the Provincetown Art Association and held the first of many juried exhibitions the following year. Weinrich contributed nine pictures to this show, all of them said to be representational and somewhat conservative in style. In 1916, she showed what one reviewer called "an interesting collection of etchings" at a Provincetown Art Association exhibition. When she showed paintings at the MacDowell Club in 1917, an art critic for the Brooklyn Daily Eagle said they showed a "strong note of impressionism".

Knaths credits two Burlington women for his success. One of these is his wife, the former Helen Weinrich, and her sister, Agnes Weinrich, who died six years ago. When the Knaths visited Burlington a year ago he told how he decided to follow the new contemporary style after watching Agnes Weinrich work in the abstract manner of painting. this was his first introduction to modern art. -- "Knaths' Show Opens Today", by George Shane Des Moines Register, May 19, 1955, p. 7.

In 1916, Weinrich joined a group of printmakers that had begun using the white-line technique pioneered by Provincetown artist B.J.O. Nordfeldt. At this time, she and the others in the group, including Blanche Lazzell, Ethel Mars, Ada Gilmore, and Edna Boies Hopkins, exchanged ideas and solved problems together. In August the following year, she showed two white-line prints at the annual exhibition of the Provincetown Art Association. A critic for The New York Times said the two prints had an "accomplished design" with "the look of woodblock printing, but with more variety of color and tone than usually is given by the block." In 1919, a magazine called The Touchstone reproduced an untitled Weinrich etching that showed parts of two houses amid trees and behind a fence.

=== Weinrich, her sister Helen, and Karl Knaths ===
By 1919 or 1920, while still spending the cold months in Manhattan and the warm ones in Provincetown, Weinrich and her sister came to consider the latter their formal place of residence. By that time, they had also met the painter, Karl Knaths. Like themselves a Midwesterner of German origin who had grown up in a household where German was spoken, he settled in Provincetown in 1919. One author says Weinrich led Knaths to adopt an abstract style of painting; another points out that Weinrich and Knaths shared artistic leanings and mutually influenced each other's increasing use of abstraction in their work. In 1922, Knaths married Helen and moved into the house that the sisters had rented. He was then 31, Helen 46, and Agnes 49 years old. When, two years later, the three decided to become year-round residents of Provincetown, Agnes and Helen used a part of their inheritance to buy land and materials for constructing a house and outbuildings for the three of them to share.

Throughout the 1920s and 1930s, Weinrich received critical notice for works she showed in exhibitions in Provincetown and New York. Her exhibitions in these two places included appearance in most of the annual shows held by the Provincetown Art Association and the New York Society of Women Artists as well as shows held by the Society of Independent Artists and two New York galleries, the Weyhe and Touchstone. She also received attention from critics outside these two home bases. A critic called attention to the still life paintings in a 1932 exhibition at the J.B. Speed Memorial Museum in Louisville, Kentucky and a critic for The Washington Post wrote a review of a solo exhibition in Washington, D.C., in 1938. Her work also appeared and received critical notice from time to time in The Boston Globe and in 1939 that paper reviewed a solo exhibition at the Boston Conservatory of Music. Her appearances in Philadelphia included the block prints she showed in the first annual exhibition of that city's Print Club, noted in The Philadelphia Inquirer. Following her death, her work was exhibited and received critical notice in group shows at places such as Burlington, Iowa; Kansas City, Missouri; Atlanta, Georgia; Iowa City, Iowa; Neenah, Wisconsin; and Lancaster, Pennsylvania. In 1997, a gallery in Des Moines gave Weinrich a retrospective exhibition to which the Burlington Hawk-Eye gave a lengthy review.

In the latter stages of her career, Weinrich continued to live with her sister Helen and Karl Knaths, mostly in Provincetown and New York but also sometimes in Washington, D.C. when Knaths was teaching at the Phillips Gallery there. In 1925, she became a founding member of the New York Society of Women Artists, She participated in its exhibitions from then until her death in 1946 and sometimes held positions on its board of directors. In 1988, April Kingsley wrote an article for the Provincetown Arts magazine that called Weinrich a "trailblazing" printmaker who was one of the first American abstractionists and who played a critical role in introducing cubist theory to American artists, collectors, and the general public. Weinrich died in Provincetown on April 17, 1946, at the age of 73. Her obituary in the Burlington Hawk Eye gave heart ailment as the cause of death.

=== Art activism ===
Weinrich became a founding member of the New York Society of Women Artists in 1925. Other Provincetown members included Blanche Lazzell, Ellen Ravenscroft, Lucy L'Engle, and Marguerite Zorach. The group's membership was initially limited to thirty painters and sculptors all of whom had the right to participate in the group's exhibitions, each getting the same space. One commenter notes that the group provided a platform for its members to distinguish themselves from the "genteel" and traditionalist art that women artists were at that time expected to show. In 1926, Weinrich joined with Knaths and other local artists in a rebellion against the more conservative artists who had dominated the Provincetown Art Association. For the next decade, 1927 through 1937, the association mounted two separate annual exhibitions, the one conservative in orientation and the other experimental. Both Weinrich and Knaths participated on the jury that selected works for the first modernist exhibition. In 1930, Weinrich put together a group show for modernists at the G.R.D. Gallery in New York. The occasion was the first time a group of Provincetown artists exhibited together in New York. For it she selected works by Knaths, Charles Demuth, Oliver Chaffee, Margarite and William Zorach, Jack Tworkov, Janice Biala, and others.

== Artistic style ==
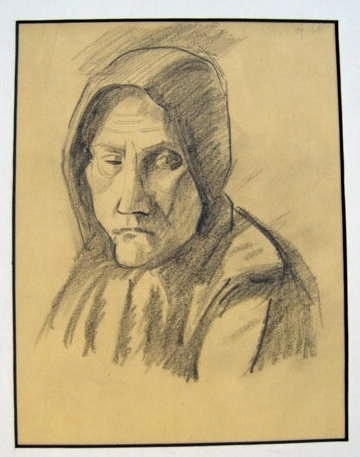
Agnes Weinrich, Old Woman, about 1915, graphite on paper, 11.5 x 7.5 inches

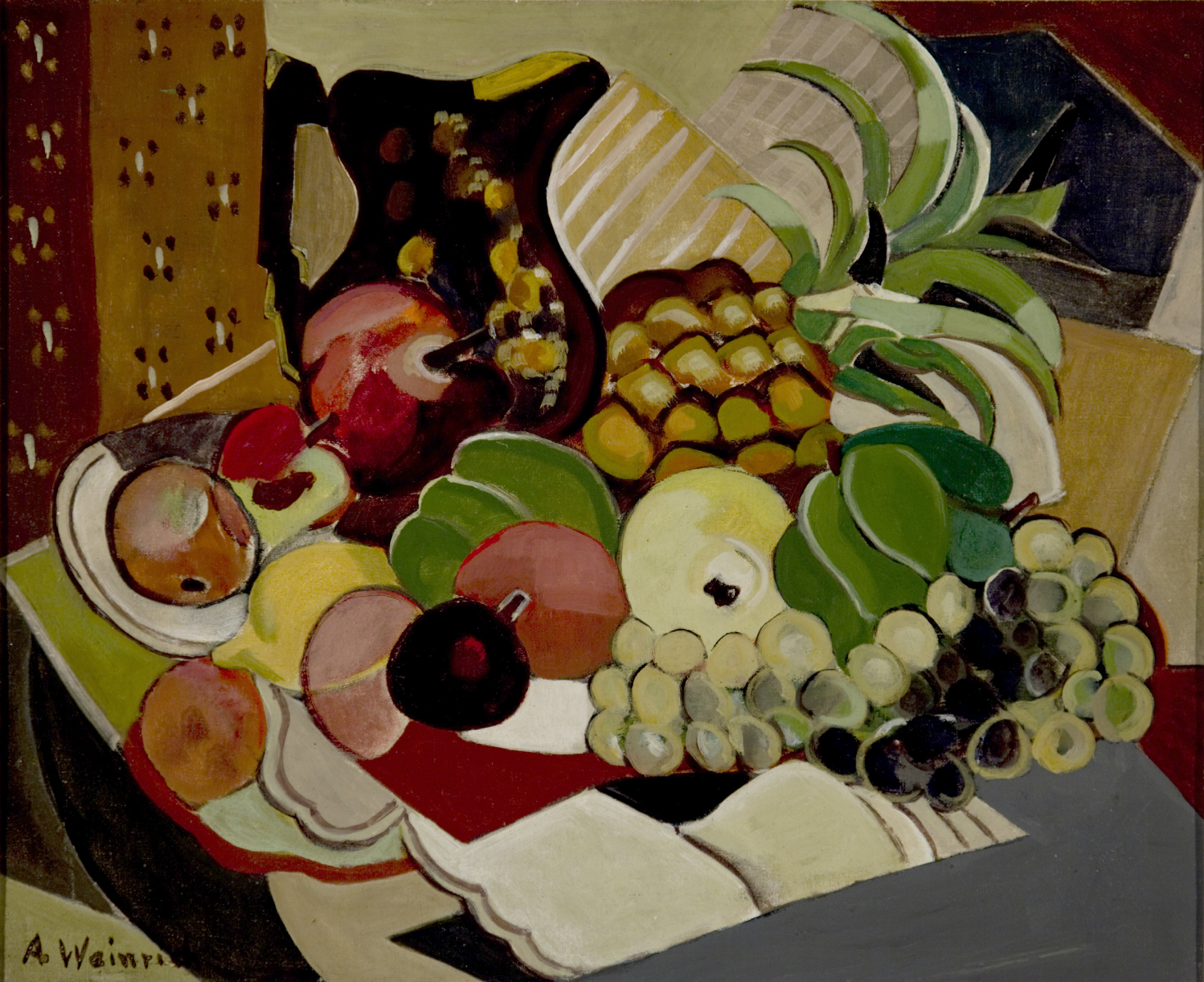
Agnes Weinrich, Still Life, 1920, oil on canvas, 17 x 22 inches

Agnes Weinrich, Night City, about 1946, oil on canvas, 24 x 16 inches

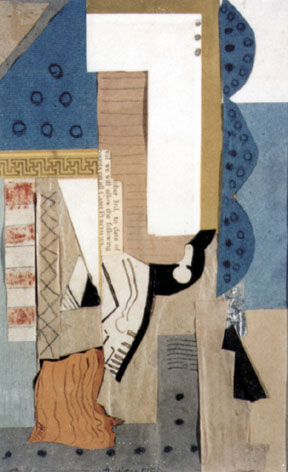
Agnes Weinrich, Untitled (Collage), about 1923, mixed media, 11 x 7 inches

Jean Metzinger, 1911, Le goûter (Tea Time), oil on canvas, 30 x 27 1/2 inches

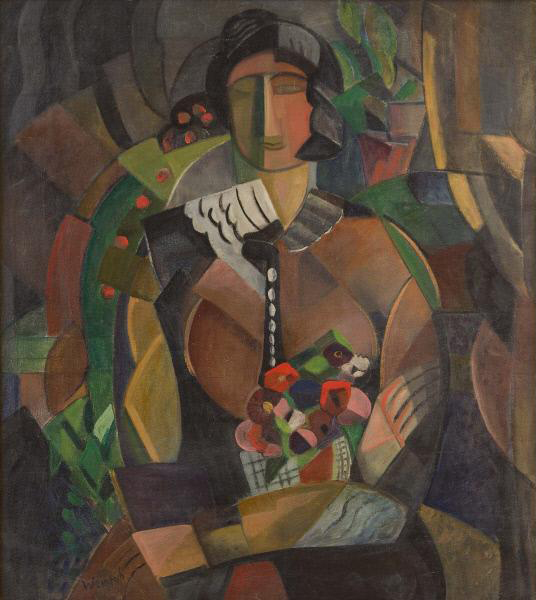
Agnes Weinrich, Woman with Flowers, 1920, oil on canvas, 34 × 30 1/4 inches

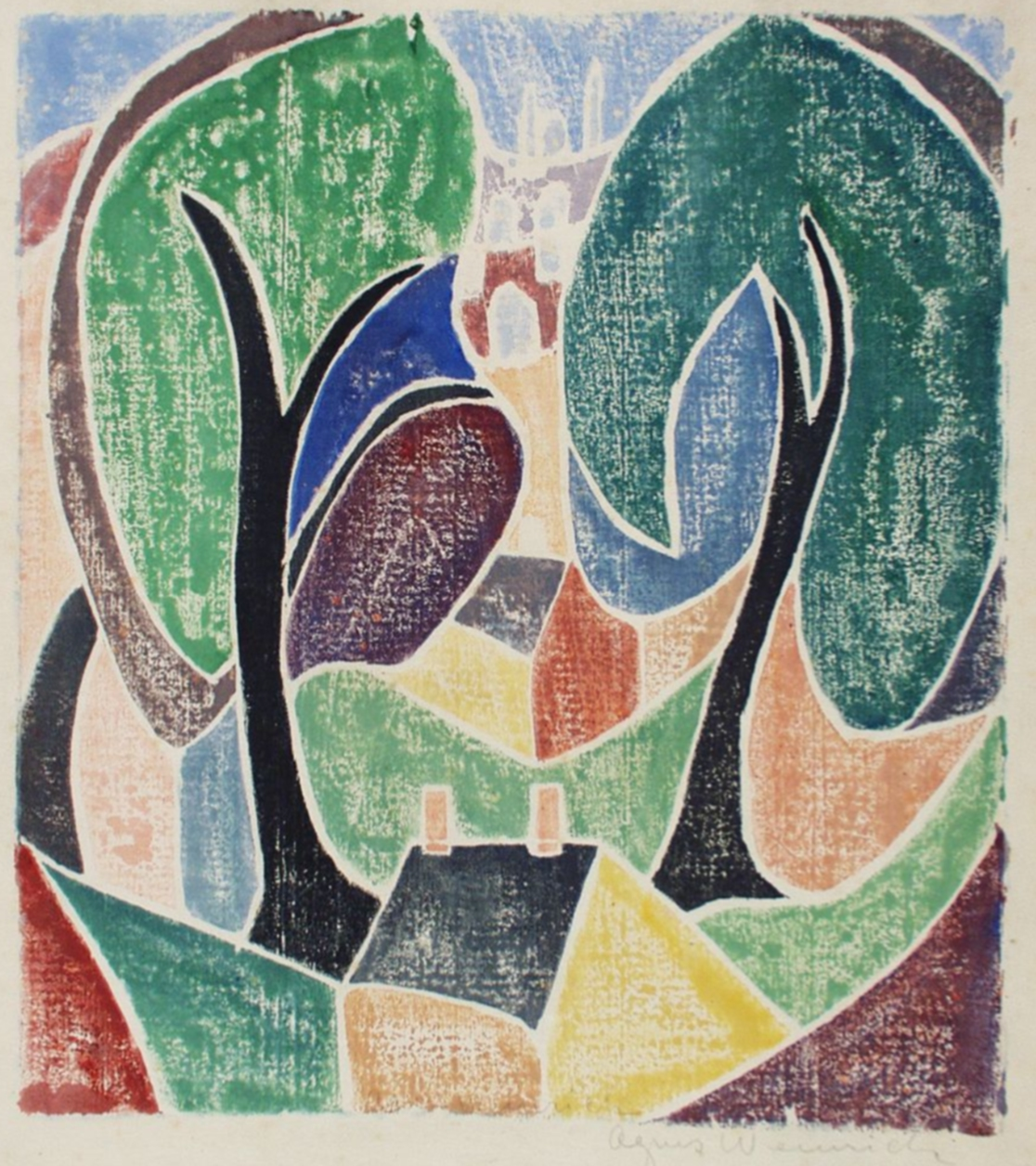
Agnes Weinrich, Untitled (Trees and Houses), about 1920, white-line block print, 12 x 10 3/4 inches, University of Iowa Stanley Museum of Art

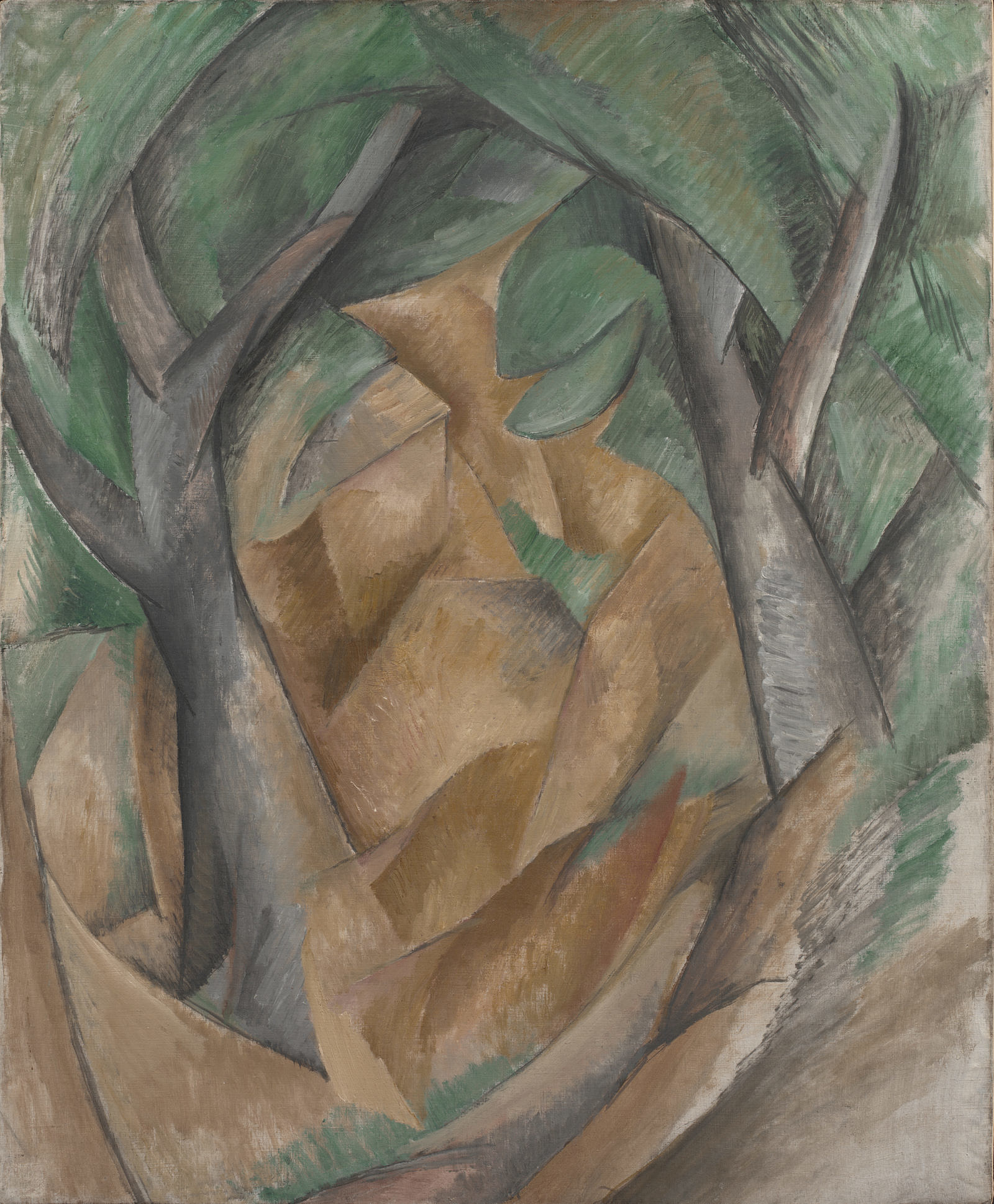
Georges Braque, Trees at L'Estaque, 1908, oil on canvas, 31 5/8 x 23 11/16 inches, National Gallery of Denmark

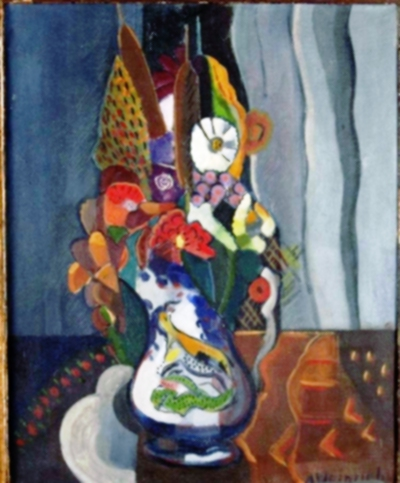
Agnes Weinrich, "The Blue Pitcher, between 1921 and 1926, oil on canvas, 22 3/8 x 17 7/8 inches

Agnes Weinrich, Plants and Fruit, 1929, oil on canvas, 36 x 28 inches

Agnes Weinrich, Abstraction, about 1930, oil on board, 24 x 20 inches

In 1998, a Provincetown gallery owner told a reporter that Weinrich's career had three phases: one in which realism predominated; a second in which she employed a semi-abstract style; and a third that was purely abstract. The first two presented the viewer with identifiable subjects and the third was wholly non-representational. Weinrich's Drawing of an Old Woman of about 1915 is in a realist style. Her cubist paintings, such as "Woman with Flowers" of 1920, fall into the semi-abstract category, as do works, such as "Still Life" of 1920, that were neither cubist nor realist. Her cubist work called "Collage" of 1923 and her painting called "Night City" of about 1946 are purely abstract. It and her other pure abstracts are, as feminist collector, Louise Noun pointed out, "composed of hard-edge geometric forms" and, lacking a discernible subject, are nonobjective.

The three phases named by the gallery owner were not chronologically distinct in that Weinrich continued to make realist, semi-abstract, and purely abstract works throughout most of her career. In accord with her early training, Weinrich's first works had been in the realist tradition and, particularly in her drawings, she continued to make realist pictures thereafter. Regarding her last solo exhibition in 1946, a critic praised Weinrich's "exceptional pencil technique in her meticulous rendering" of two flower subjects. Weinrich had seen cubist and other avant-garde art while in Paris and met American artists who had begun to appreciate it. On her return to the United States, she discussed new theories and techniques with artists in New York and Provincetown, some of whom she had met in Paris. In Provincetown, one source says she and three other artists—Blanche Lazzell, Lucy L'Engle, and Ada Gilmore, "were at the center of the maelstrom that accompanied the rise of Modernism". The members of this loosely-knit group influenced one another as their personal styles evolved. In addition to these three women, the group included Maude Squire, William Zorach, Oliver Chaffee, and Ambrose Webster. One source says that most of these artists had read and discussed the influential cubist writings of Albert Gleizes and Gino Severini. Writing in 1921, a critic wrote, "Whether they intend it or not, these cubists and their fellow radicals are gradually proving by their work that their function is most legitimately concerned with revivifying applied design and with making it significant of the nervous individuality and independence of the times in which we live." This critic said the artists showed "vigor" and "eager, straining imagination". After 1920, some of Weinrich's paintings show a strong influence of the theoretical writings of Albert Gleizes and another cubist, Jean Metzinger. Her painting, "Woman With Flowers" of 1920 shows similarities to Metzinger's 1911 painting called "Le goûter (Tea Time)". "Le goûter" was discussed in books and journals of the time, including Gleizes's and Metzinger's influential book Du "Cubisme" (1912).

Weinrich's block prints were often in a cubist-influenced semi-abstract style. In 1996, Louise Noun discussed one of these, a white-line print of about 1917. Noun noted a similarity between an untitled print that is informally called "Trees and Houses" and Georges Braque's oil painting called "Big Trees at L'Estaque". Of "Trees and Houses", Noun wrote, "The rounded shapes of the foliage along with the curved trunks of the trees contrast with the angular houses in the center to make a pleasing composition. Although abstract, the artist has used local color: green for foliage and greens and browns for land patches, black for tree trunks, tans for house siding. It calls to mind Braque's 1908 landscape oil 'Big Trees at L'Estaque'." Other paintings, particularly her still-lifes and flower studies, were semi-abstract with less cubist influence. When the flower study called "Blue Pitcher" was shown in Provincetown in 1927, a critic for The New York Times wrote that like her other semi-abstract flower paintings it was "strong as a closed fist", adding, "It is complete, no fault in it. every inch thought out and interesting." In 2013, a writer described an oil called "Plants and Fruit" and another semi-abstract painting, both held by the Phillips Collection, as "worthy examples of her abstract, vigorous style." Regarding Weinrich's pure abstractions, a New York Times critic called attention to a painting of about 1930 called "Abstraction" that the critic said was "entirely free from the dictates of conservatism". Near the end of her career, a critic for the Christian Science Monitor wrote that Weinrich's pure abstractions contained "planes of color sensitively modulated."

For most of her career, Weinrich produced works in oil, watercolor or gouache, pencil or crayon, and prints. For her subjects, she continued to choose still lifes, flower settings, landscapes, figures, and geometric abstracts whose subjects were not readily discernible; her treatment continued to be both abstract and realist.

== Critical reception ==
Critics gave favorable attention to Weinrich's work during the early years of her career. When she showed at New York's Water Color Club in 1917, a critic for The New York Times said her work was "accomplished in design". A year later, reviewing an exhibition at the Penguin Gallery in Boston, a Christian Science Monitor critic said she infused the cubist formula with "something like emotion". In 1919, American Art News called works shown at New York's Touchstone Gallery "clever and entertaining". This attention continued during the 1920s with notices in the metropolitan dailies and the art press. In 1921, a New York Times reviewer poked fun at a landscape that he or she likened to an earthquake. In 1927, another Times critic gave her flower paintings extravagant praise. In a balanced review of a two-person show held in 1929, a Times critic said her landscapes had "quiet charm" but said her cubist abstracts were "distressingly doctrinaire".

During the last fifteen years of her life, the art press continued its coverage of Weinrich's exhibitions and its critical appraisals of her work. In 1930, a reviewer said, "her delicacy and good taste are evident, but curiously the best details in her pictures are the least abstract." Eight years later, another said, "[Her] drawings some in black and white, some in colors shown at the Public Library are feminine ... There is a bit of Braque, a bit of Matisse, a bit of Knaths. all put into a frail, feminine melting pot". That year, a third wrote: "Miss Weinrich's prints and paintings ... serve as most excellent examples of the trend of art, away from tradition and toward the realization of new ideals."

In 1936, a critic for the Christian Science Monitor wrote that in her still-lifes she matched the "strength and brilliance" of Braque and Rouault" This critic saw in her watercolors, drawings, and pastels an "opulence of color" and "brisk, luminous, determined handling." The critic added,

She is definitely in harmony with the Parisian spirit, indifferent to imitation, and yet motivated by the outward qualities of the things she paints. To gain clarity, cohesion, [and] contrast, she permits the form to dissolve somewhat, to relax or tighten as the scheme demands; she may prefer to distort or to suppress a shape, or to heighten with thick outline. It is the design which conveys vitality by handling color, contrast, outline with independence and audacity.

Following her death, critics were more likely to describe Weinrich's style rather than to evaluate it. An exception was the 1977 review of a retrospective exhibition held in Des Moines, Iowa. In it, the author said her cubist paintings were derivative but, "When she doesn't adhere to the tenets of Cubism, her work explores and moves in an interesting direction." The author saw these non-cubist, semi-abstract paintings as more personal, "allowing her own predilections to emerge." Reviewing a retrospective exhibition held in 1998, a critic wrote, "Working in white-line woodcut, oil on canvas, and pencil, Weinrich developed a style of lively colors and forms which have the splashy feeling of modernism without losing a basic sense of structure."

In her 1996 article about Weinrich, Louise Noun emphasized the difficulties she and other women artists faced in an environment where men attracted more critical attention and sold more works of art. Reviewing a 1926 exhibition held by the New York Society of Women Artists, a critic for the New YorkEvening Post addressed this subject. She wrote, "Woman [as artist] has not had a very long period of unclipped wings in which to practice flying, but even so, she is making good progress in her flight to the stars, where, after all, many of her patronizing critics have not yet arrived either." Writing long after Weinrich's death, two writers, Noun and a critic for a Massachusetts paper, noted that Weinrich was privileged in at least one respect. Her inherited income made it unnecessary for her to earn a living and gave her the freedom to make whatever art she wished.

== Exhibitions ==
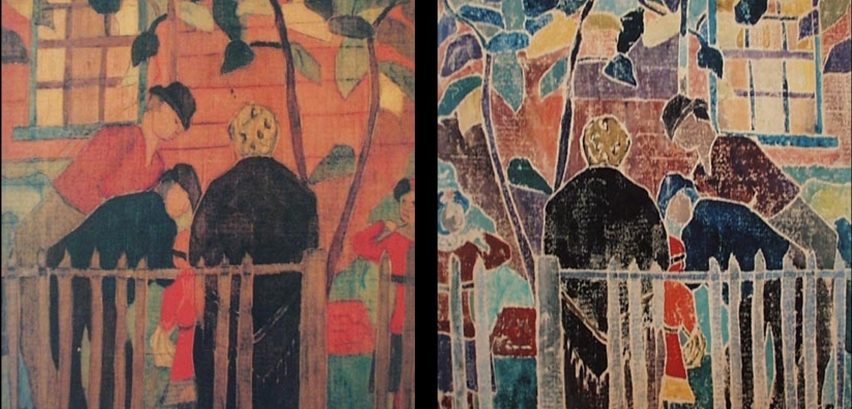
Broken Fence by Agnes Weinrich, a white line woodblock made on or before 1917; at left: the picture she made as source for the print; at right: a print pulled from the woodblock

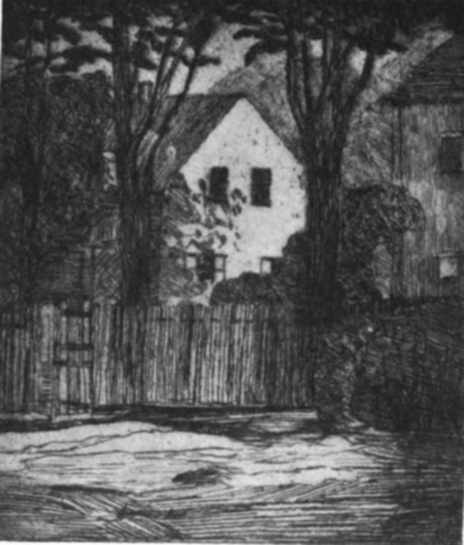
Agnes Weinrich, Etching (House at the Hillside), 1919 as published in Touchstone magazine v. 4, n. 4, January 1919

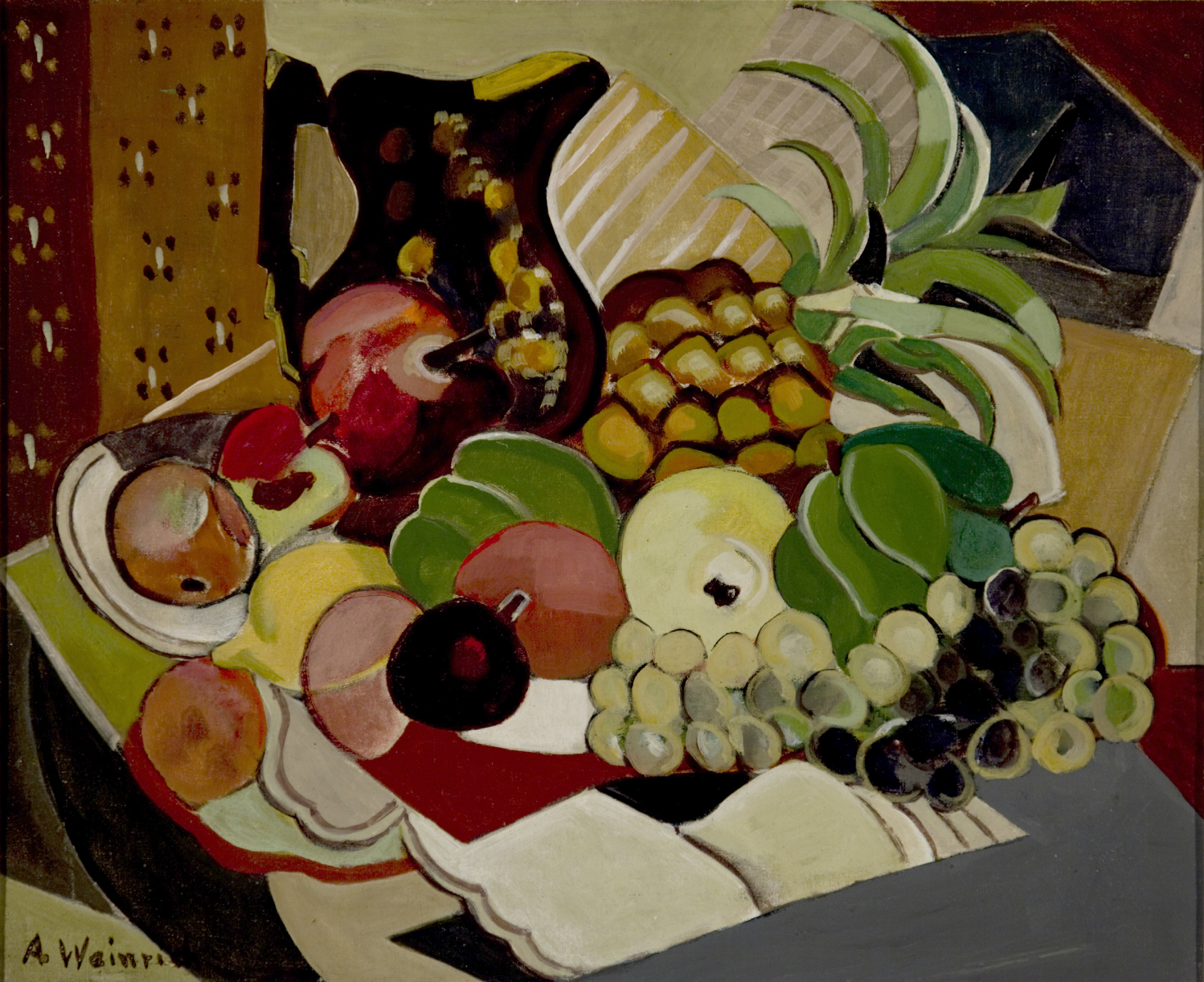
Agnes Weinrich, Still Life, 1920, oil on canvas, 17 x 22 inches

Weinrich participated in many group exhibitions held by nonprofit organizations such as the Provincetown Art Association and the New York Society of Women Artists. She held three solo exhibitions during her life: in 1936 at the Harley Perkins Gallery in Boston, in 1938 at the public library in Washington D.C., and in 1946, at the Woljeska Gallery. In the 1917 Provincetown Artists Association exhibition, she showed a block print called "Broken Fence". Noun said the "simplified design and clear colors" of this print lent it "a fresh Modernist note". In 1919, she showed an etching called "Houses (House at the Hillside)" in an exhibition in New York's Touchstone gallery that also included works by Mary A. Kirkup, Blanche Lazzell, and Flora Schoenfeld. She showed an oil called "Still Life" at the 1920 Provincetown Art Association exhibition.

This is a selective list of group exhibitions in which she participated during her life. In addition to the article by Louise Noun, its sources are exhibition catalogs such as those of the Provincetown Art Association, as well as contemporary news accounts, including American Art News, The New York Times, the Brooklyn Daily Eagle, the New York Evening Post, The Philadelphia Inquirer, and The Christian Science Monitor.

- 1915 onward: Provincetown Art Association
- 1917: Pennsylvania Academy of Fine Arts, Philadelphia
- 1917-23: Society of Independent Artists, New York
- 1919: Touchstone Gallery, New York
- 1919: Art Institute of Chicago
- 1920: Boston Arts Club
- 1926 onward: New York Society of Women Artists
- 1928: Grace Horn Gallery, Boston
- 1929: Pennsylvania Academy of Fine Arts, Philadelphia
- 1932: Boston Public Library
- 1938: Boston Society of Independent Artists
- 1939: Corcoran Gallery Biennial, Washington, D.C.
- 1939: Witherstine Gallery, Boston
- 1939: Institute of Modern Art, Boston
- 1945: Woljeska Gallery, Brooklyn, New York
