= Flora Schofield =

American painter

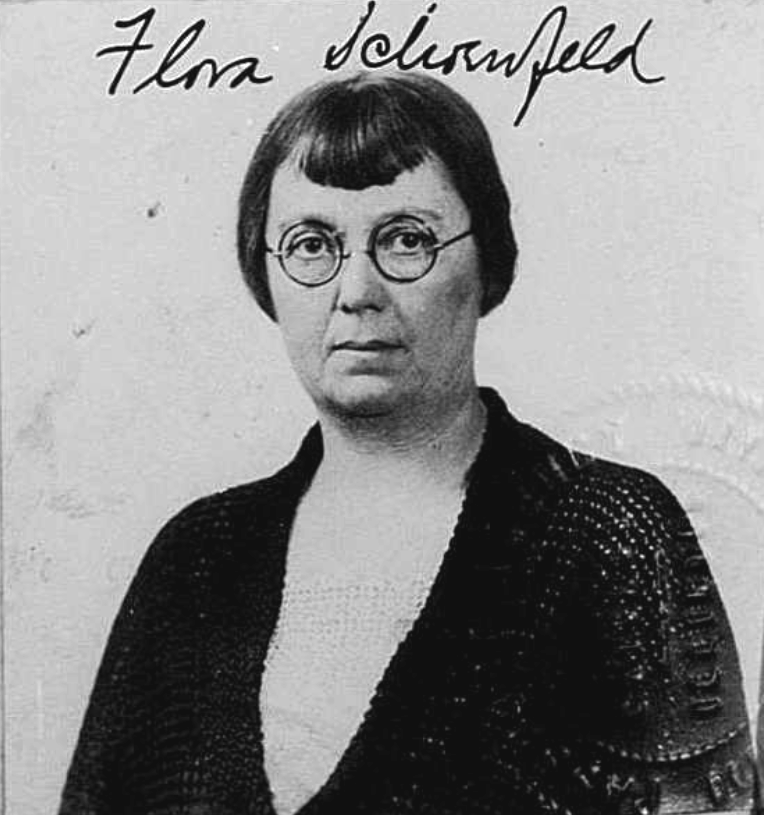
- Flora Schofield, US passport photo, 1923
- Born: Flora Israel; March 6, 1871; Lanark, Illinois
- Died: October 5, 1960 (aged 89); Chicago, Illinois
- Resting place: Rosehill Cemetery, Chicago

Flora Schofield (March 6, 1871 – October 8, 1960) was an American artist known for her abstract paintings in oil and watercolor as well as her woodblock prints. (Note: Records of her birth year vary. The sources most likely to be authoritative give 1871 as the birth year. That year is given in the 1900 US Census, her husband's passport application of 1906, and the Illinois Women Artists Project. In addition, she was listed as nine years old in the 1880 US Census. Alternative birth years appear in passport applications, ship manifests for ocean crossings, and a death record. These show birth dates ranging from 1872 to 1876.) Her chief subjects were still lifes, landscapes, and portraits, and her dominant style was abstract. She received her art education at the Art Institute of Chicago and at schools and ateliers in Provincetown, and Paris. In 1939, she told a critic that of all the many artists she had studied under, the Parisian cubist Albert Gleizes gave her the most useful instruction. Schofield was born in Illinois and, when not resident abroad, spent most of her career in Chicago. Schofield exhibited widely in Chicago, Provincetown, and Paris.

== Early life and training ==
As a child, Schofield received art instruction during a year of study in a Stuttgart boarding school during a period when her German-born parents had traveled to Germany from their home in Lanark, Illinois for an extended visit with family members. On returning, she went to Lanark High School. The family subsequently moved to Chicago, and there Schofield was able to continue her art education. For many years, her mother had insisted she study music and not art. Nonetheless, after the move to Chicago, she took classes at the School of the Art Institute in that city. In the late 1930s, she told a biographer that she secretly attended the classes with her father's support, against her mother's wishes. Thereafter, from the mid-1890s until 1904, she taught Saturday classes at the school. In 1896, her marriage to a successful Chicago lawyer who supported her ambitions gave her the ability to pursue a career in art free of economic concerns. In the decades following her training at the Art Institute, Schofield continued to study art as a practicing artist. In the early 1900s, she studied under Charles Webster Hawthorne at the Cape Cod art colony in Provincetown, Massachusetts. A few years later, seeking training in a more up-to-date style, she began to study at Provincetown's newly-opened modernist art school under B.J. Norfeldt and William Zorach. During the 1920s, seeking to learn techniques of European modernism, she made extended trips to Paris where she studied under the modernists, Othon Friesz, Albert Gleizes, André Lhote, Fernand Leger, Natalia Goncharova, and Gino Severini. She disliked Lhote's abrupt practice of painting over his students' work and much preferred the way Gleizes would wait for the student to acknowledge a problem and ask for help. Schofield later told a critic that during the 1920s she had spent more time in France than in the United States and had begun to feel herself a citizen of two continents.

== Career in art ==
Early in her career, Schofield exhibited in exhibitions held by the Provincetown Art Association and in group exhibitions in Chicago, often drawing notice in newspapers and art journals. From the late 1890s to the early 1900s, Schofield exhibited with the Art Students League of Chicago. Between 1897 and 1944, she exhibited 37 times in the exhibition of artists from Chicago and vicinity at the Art Institute of Chicago, and won prizes in 1921, 1929, and 1931. From 1897 to 1932, she exhibited frequently at the annual exhibitions of works by American Artists at the Art Institute. Between 1918 and 1949, she showed 17 times in exhibitions held by Chicago's Renaissance Society at the University of Chicago. Two years after its formation in 1914, she joined and began showing with the Provincetown Art Association. In 1933, Schofield joined a group of Chicago artists called "The Ten" and thereafter showed regularly with them through the end of the decade.

She also contributed paintings to stand-alone shows. During the first decade of the 20th century, she exhibited at exhibitions held in Chicago by the Society of Western Artists and in Manhattan by the New York Water Color Club. In the following decade, her work appeared in exhibitions held by the Artists' Guild and the Arts Club in Chicago, at the Panama–Pacific International Exposition in San Francisco and at a benefit exhibition to aid the struggling artists in war-torn France.

During the 1920s, 1930s, and 1940s she showed at the Pennsylvania Academy of the Fine Arts, Carnegie Institute, National Arts Club of New York, and Chicago's Marshall Field Galleries, She was one of the artists included in an exhibition of painting and sculpture from 16 American Cities held at the Museum of Modern Art in Manhattan and in a show called Women Painters of America at the Wichita Art Museum in Kansas. In Paris, she showed in the Salon d'Automne, Salon des Indépendants, and Salon des Surindépendants. She was also given a solo exhibition at the Galerie Carmine in Paris. Late in her career, Schofield participated in the Century of Progress Exhibition of Paintings & Sculpture at the Art Institute of Chicago (1947).

Early in her career, Schofield rented studios in Chicago and Provincetown. During the 1920s and early 1930s, she worked in Paris studios. In 1934, she designed a townhouse in Chicago, which, once built, became a studio-home for her and her husband and for their adult son, Paul.

=== Technique, artistic style, and critical reception ===
For me, construction and organization of the picture are the most important [considerations], and the representational element is always secondary. Of course, I find form and color and line in the exterior world. But my business as a painter is to utilize these as I see fit for the creation of my painting. I am asked, is this a contribution to society? I answer that it is a contribution to art, which is enough.

— Flora Schofield, quoted in Art of Chicago Today (Chicago, J.Z. Jacobson, 1932, p 115)

The training Schofield received as a student at the Art Institute of Chicago was resolutely anchored in the academic tradition of 19th-century European idealism. By the time she began studying at the Hawthorne school in Provincetown, the Art Institute had begun to permit instruction in the new realist style of George Bellows and others. Critics called attention to the paintings Schofield showed early in the 20th century and singled them out for praise. In 1913, a critic for American Art News labelled them as modernist in a favorable review of a watercolor show at the Art Institute in 1913. Not long afterwards, Schofield left the Art Institute school and began to take classes from the Hawthorne school in Provincetown. There, she was exposed to a combination of American realism and Impressionism that she did not find compatible with her artistic objectives and she began a transition to the post-impressionist, fauvist style sometimes called American modernism then being taught in classes she took from Nordfeldt and Zorach.

Accompanying her change in style, Schofield adopted the technique of woodblock printing then being explored by Nordfeldt and a handful of women artists including Blanche Lazzell, Agnes Weinrich, and Schofield's friend, Ada Gilmore. The group, known as the Provincetown Printers, used an innovative variant of a Japanese method by which color prints could be produced using a single block. The innovation required the artist to incise lines around each color segment in the design. The resulting print had uncolored (and thus white) lines outlining the colored areas. The process was laborious since the watercolor or gouache pigments had to be re-applied to the block before each print was taken. Because the technique was not suitable for portraying depth or for modeling figures, it was well suited for the bold colors and flat design of Japanese-influenced European modernism.

Having learned the technique, Schofield showed white line prints as well as oil and watercolor paintings in exhibitions of the World War I years and later. When she showed oils called "Little Nancy" and "On the Beach" at the Chicago Arts Club in 1917, a reviewer commented on the "flat, decorative" style that characterized them. In 1919, the Touchstone Gallery in Manhattan exhibited oil paintings by Schofield and three other artists who worked in Provincetown. An article discussing the show said the four had "felt the influence of [Provincetown's] modern schools of painting". An image of a realistic Schofield portrait that accompanied the article showed a girl or young woman, full-length, in profile. Reviewing the show, a critic said a child portrait contained "much that is nicely and sympathetically felt." The critic also praised Schofield's still lifes in the show as "admirably treated from the technical point of view". In 1920, the city art museum of Detroit purchased a Schofield block print called "The Blue Chair".

When Schofield studied in Paris during the 1920s, she absorbed Gleizes's approach to cubism. Called "salon cubism", this style - less severe than the Montmartre Cubism of Pablo Picasso and Georges Braque — permitted viewers to more easily identify a painting's subject matter. In 1921, a jury that included proponents of European modernism such as Arthur B. Carles, Joseph Stella, and Alfred Stieglitz selected her paintings for a popular exhibition of American modernists held at the Pennsylvania Academy.

Among Chicago's newspaper critics, Eleanor Jewett most consistently found things to say about Schofield's style. Writing in the daily and Sunday Chicago Tribune, she appreciated the livelier aspects of her style and deplored the subtler ones. Jewett mentioned her in 1921, when Schofield won a prize at the Artists of Chicago and Vicinity Exhibition at the Art Institute, but did not then comment on her style. In 1926, she objected to Schofield's palette, saying she used "a brush apparently morbidly dipped in the melancholy colors of a palette itself a little afraid of life." She also called attention a cubist influence in some paintings and praised Schofield's forcefulness in others, and, in still others, noted her ability to paint with delicacy and charm. In 1930, she found a Schofield painting to be "hauntingly, soberly beautiful" and in 1932, found one painting to be clever and another distressingly improbable. In later years, she saw reliance on Giorgio de Chirico and André Derain in some works, an uncomfortable degree of predictability in others, and, in general, a welcome transition from dull, lifeless colors to works that were both intelligible, beautiful, and, in one case, having extraordinary design. In the mid-1930s, Jewett saw continued improvement in the paintings, finding some that were "beautiful in color, sound in painting, and intelligible in composition" and one, called "Grandmother's Chair", to be one of the most stunning pictures in an exhibit that she called one of the most delightful then on view. Yet by the end of the decade, she saw the work being exhibited as "modern, dry, dull, more than a little monotonous in color variety."

In 1939, influential Chicago art critic C. J. Bulliet wrote a piece on Schofield in a series of artist biographies appearing in the Chicago Daily News. In it, he linked Schofield with the city's modernist artists and described an occasion in 1923 when, in his view, three abstract paintings of hers had "proved the final triple wedge that split asunder the old established Chicago Society of Artists, founded in 1888". Bulliet said Schofield was like a "storm petrel" when she began to work in her modernist style in 1918 and said this set the stage for her to establish s "spectacular career as a painter."

== Personal life and family ==
Schofield was born on March 6, 1871, in Lanark, Illinois. Her birth name was Flora Israel. She also used the middle initial I or middle names Irwin and Itwin.

Her father, Bernard Israel, was a dry goods merchant. His name was also given as Bernhard Israel or Bernhard Israels. He died in 1926. Schofield's mother, Mathilde Lepman Israel, was a homemaker. She died in 1916.

On September 2, 1896, Schofield married a successful lawyer in private practice named Frank Schoenfeld. The couple had a daughter, Marion (or Marian), who died between 1905 and 1910, and a son, Paul Schofield (birth name Frank Paul Schoenfeld), who was born in 1907 and died in 1956. In the late 1920s, Frank changed their surname from Schoenfeld to Schofield, and Flora, who had been signing her artworks Flora Schoenfeld, began using Flora Schofield.
