= Ferol Sibley Warthen =

American painter

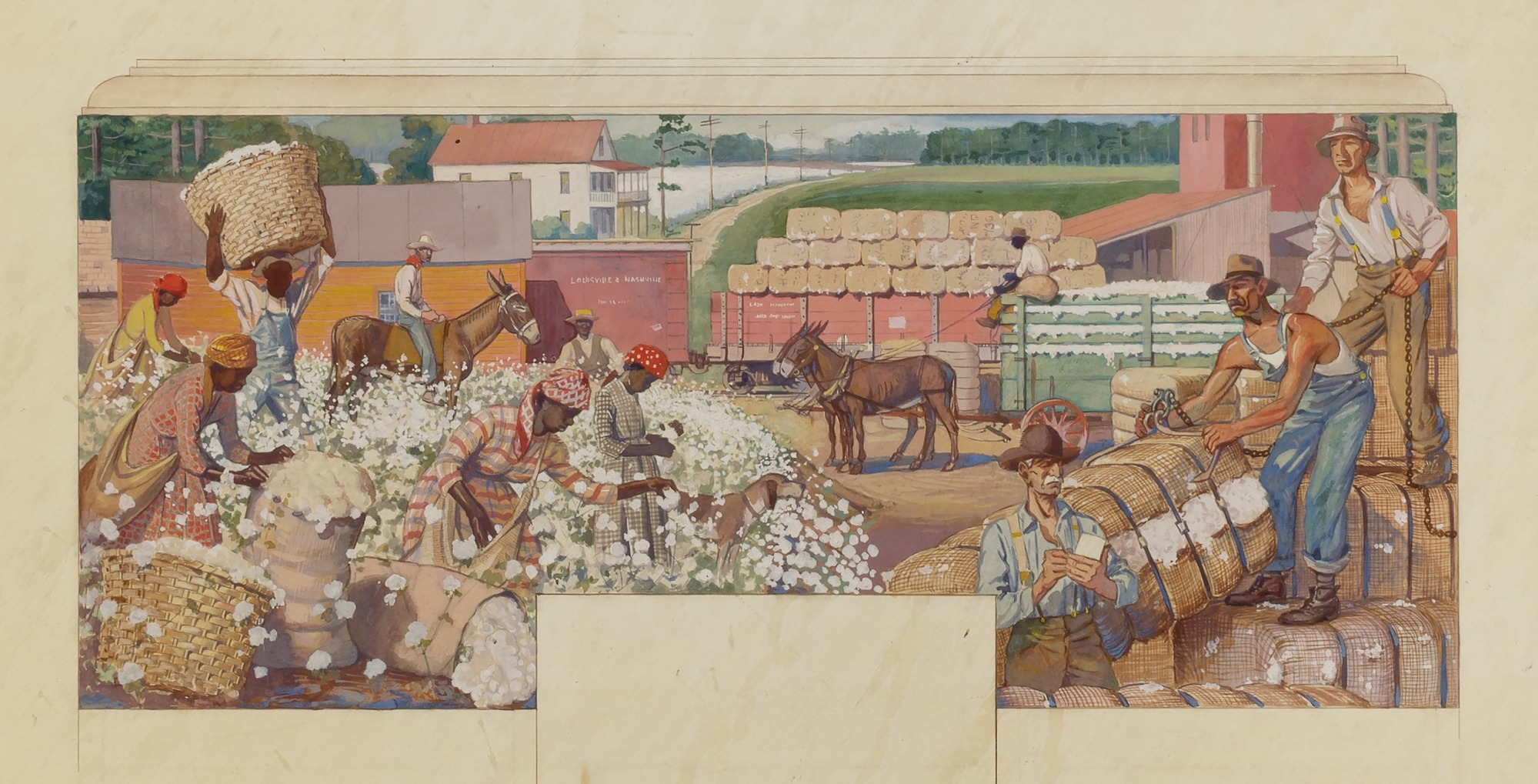
Study for Cotton Scene (1941), a mural Warthen created for the post office in Hartselle, Alabama

Ferol Katherine Sibley Warthen (May 22, 1890 – January 21, 1986), also known as Mrs. Lee R. Warthen, was an American painter and printmaker.

Warthen was born Ferol Sibley in Aberdeen, South Dakota. She received a full scholarship to the Columbia Art School in Ohio, which she attended from 1908 until 1910. From 1911 until 1913 she was a student of William Merritt Chase and Kenneth Hayes Miller at the Art Students League of New York, and she received her bachelor's degree in education from Ohio State University. She continued her studies later in life with Karl Knaths, Blanche Lazzell, and Un'ichi Hiratsuka. She moved to the Washington, D.C. area in the 1930s, and remained there for the rest of her life, though she exhibited widely elsewhere. A specialist in woodblock prints, she also worked in oils, watercolor, and gouache. Organizations with which she exhibited include the Society of Independent Artists, the National Academy of Design, the Philadelphia Water Color Club, the Provincetown Art Association, the Washington Print Club, the Washington Printmakers Society, and the Washington Water Club; she also belonged to the Society of Washington Artists, the Philadelphia Color Print Society, and Boston Printmakers. From 1973 until 1974 she was the subject of a solo exhibition at the National Museum of American Art. Warthen was associated with the Provincetown Printers during her career, and frequently summered in Provincetown. Married to Lee Roland Warthen, she died in Silver Spring, Maryland.

Three pieces by Warthen are in the collection of the Smithsonian American Art Museum. These include a gouache study for a mural, Cotton Scene (1941), for the post office of Hartselle, Alabama, and two woodcuts, Table Top (1963) and Lighthouse (1972). Cotton Scene has been relocated to the Hartselle Chamber of Commerce office in the town's historic railroad depot. A painting, Ladies Luncheon, is owned by the Cape Cod Museum of Art.
