= Lucy L'Engle =

American painter

- Born: Lucy Stelle Brown; September 26, 1889; Manhattan, New York
- Died: March 14, 1978 (aged 88); Provincetown, Massachusetts
- Known for: Artist
- Spouse: William Johnson L'Engle
- Website: lenglefinearts.com

Lucy L'Engle (1889–1978) was an American painter who had an abstract style that ranged from Cubist to representational to purely abstract. Critics appreciated the discipline she showed in constructing a solid base on which these stylistic phases evolved. As one of them, Helen Appleton Read of the Brooklyn Daily Eagle, said in 1932, she was "at heart a painter with a painter's sensuous enjoyment of the medium itself." L'Engle herself at one time described her art as "a play of form and color" and at another said, "My pictures represent my feelings about experiences. They are experiments in modern art." Over the course of a long career she used studios in both Manhattan and Provincetown and exhibited in both commercial galleries and the annual shows held by two membership organizations, the New York Society of Women Artists and the Provincetown Art Association.

== Early life and training ==
L'Engle was born in Manhattan on September 26, 1889, to a wealthy real estate broker and his wife. As a young adult she traveled abroad to study art without enrolling in an instructional program. In 1922 she reported that she received "conventional school training" at the Art League and in Paris. By "Art League" she meant the Art Students League, where, between 1911 and 1912 she studied with George Bridgman and others. By "Paris" she meant a subsequent two years of informal study with the cubist painter, Albert Gleizes and two years of classes at the Académie Julian. Although not mentioned in 1922, her grandson reports that in 1909 she may have attended a session of Charles Webster Hawthorne's Cape Cod School of Art in Provincetown. After returning to the United States in 1916 she spent the next two summers at the Hawthorne school and in 1924 returned to Paris for further study with Gleizes, who by then had become a friend and colleague as well as teacher.

== Career in art ==
In April, 1918, L'Engle contributed two paintings to the second annual exhibition of the Society of Independent Artists, an organization that abided by the slogan "no jury, no prizes" and that welcomed all artists to show their work on payment of a small fee. She contributed paintings to subsequent exhibitions in 1920 through 1923, 1925, and 1936. In the summer of 1918 she set up a studio in Provincetown and showed at the fourth annual exhibition of the Provincetown Art Association. From this time until 1946 she contributed paintings to the association's annual exhibitions almost every year.

In 1922 she participated in a joint exhibition with Florance Waterbury, an artist, who, like herself, came from a prosperous and well-connected New York family and who, like herself, had studied at the Hawthorne summer school. (Note: Unlike L'Engle, Waterbury (1883-1968) was a realist painter greatly influenced by her travels in Asia. She became a scholar, collector, and connoisseur of early Chinese art, and, toward the end or her life, a generous donor to art museums.) Held at the newly-opened Art Centre, the show attracted notice of the prominent New York critics. (Note: The Art Centre was a cooperative venture established by the Art Alliance of America, an organization founded in 1914 to help illustrators, designers, and craftsmen connect with advertising agencies, publishers, and other businesses that purchased art products. It opened in 1921 and the joint exhibition of Waterbury and L'Engle was one of its first art shows. The building's main purpose was to provide space for organizations representing graphic artists, craftsmen, illustrators, and professional photographers. In the early 1930s when the Art Center, Alliance, and other organizations were merged into the National Alliance of Art and Industry.) The critic for the New York Times was interested in her handling of form and color, while the Evening Post contrasted Waterbury's decorative paintings with L'Engle's modernistic ones, and the Evening Telegram admired the "rare personal quality and a freshness of viewpoint, combined with an unusual sense of coloring." (Note: Elizabeth Smith, the author of the piece in the Evening Telegram, added: "You may or may not like her art, for art it undoubtedly is, whether you like it or not. If you are honest, however, you will have to admit in any event that you are interested by her work, and your interest and imagination is intrigued.") Later in 1922 L'Engle participated in a group show held by Salons of America and did so again in 1925 and 1934. (Note: Organized by Hamilton Easter Field, Salons of America was a break-away from the Society of Independent Artists, formed with the same ideals but insisting of no hierarchy of presentation—every artist to be given equal treatment including display alphabetically by surname.) In 1925 L'Engle was invited to show in a Parisian exhibition of Cubist paintings called L'Art Aujourd'hui that included the principal French exponents of that style. That year she also became a founding member and subsequently an officer of the New York Society of Women Artists, an organization that was created to provide a radical alternative for women who were dissatisfied with the relatively conservative National Association of Women Painters and Sculptors. (Note: The New York Society of Women Artists was founded in 1925 explicitly as an alternative to the National Association of Women Painters and Sculptors. It aimed to show art that was innovative and not overly feminine. Each member was allotted the same amount of space in its exhibitions. In addition to L'Engle, the founding members included Adelaide Lawson, Agnes Weinrich, Anne Goldthwaite, Blanche Lazzell, Henrietta Shore, Louise Upton Brumback, Margaret Wendell Huntington, Marjorie Organ, and Sonia Gordon Brown.) She showed in the society's exhibition of 1926 and in most later years until 1949.

In 1930 she showed for the first time in a commercial gallery, the S. P. R. Penthouse Galleries belonging to a group of architects and designers whose goal was the development of a distinctive American modernism in design. In 1931 and again in 1933 and 1934 she participated in group exhibitions held at a commercial gallery, the Weyhe Gallery. With her in the 1931 show were Dorothy Brett, Caroline Durieux, Elinor Gobson, Lois Lenski, Alice Newton, Amelie Pumpelly, Ruth Starr Rose, and Helen Woods Rous.

She showed paintings at the Pennsylvania Academy of Fine Arts annual of 1934 and showed prints in a group exhibition at the Grant Gallery in 1939. In 1947 she participated in a four-woman show at the Studio Gallery (Note: Begun in 1943 by a founder and one-time president of the New York Society of Women Artists, Ellen Ravenscroft, the Studio Gallery specialized in shows of work by women artists. It closed sometime before her death in 1949.) and in 1951 was given a solo exhibition at the Wellons Gallery. Appearing with her husband William L'Engle in 1956 at the Bodley Gallery, she showed composite works that were called montages at the time and that have since come to be known as combines. The Times critic said "Mrs. L'Engle has assembled bits and pieces of many materials in her montages. Her idea is to show, by example, that costly materials are not necessary for creation." (Note: The critic added: "As colorful objects, her montages are pleasing, though they fall short of being works of art.") She had a solo exhibition at the Lynn Kottler Gallery in 1962 and in 1965 showed drawings of archaic Greek sculpture at the Hotel Barbizon.

L'Engle died in Provincetown on March 14, 1978. Posthumous exhibitions include joint exhibitions for both L'Engles in 1978 and 1999 in Provincetown, in 1997 in Truro, Massachusetts, and in 2010 at D. Wigmore Fine Art.

=== Artistic style and critical reception ===
Lucy L'Engle, Boats on the Beach at Cavalaire, France, 1923, 23 1/2 x 28 3/4 inches

Lucy L'Engle, Standing Figure, 1927, 60 x 24 inches

Lucy L'Engle, Two Nuns, 1944, watercolor, 14 x 19 inches

Lucy L'Engle, Graffiti, 1951, gouache, ink, and graphite on paper, 18 x 22 3/4 inches

L'Engle's early style was Cubist, based on her association with Albert Gleizes. Later, she said she felt she could continue for a long time to express herself in that mode, but then, as later, her approach was eclectic and she also painted in a more individual style which reminded critics of fellow Provincetown artists, Oliver Chaffee and Agnes Weinrich whose manner of painting could not be easily pigeon-holed. The paintings, "Boats on the Beach at Cavalaire" of 1923 (shown at left) and "Standing Figure" of 1927 (shown at right) illustrate her early style. Writing in 1928 of a complex work showing an interior view with mirror and a through view to a tall building outside, Elizabeth L. Cary of the New York Times credited L'Engle with a "clear precision" and said the work "succeeds quite remarkably in keeping everything in its separate plane without insistence on planar perspective." As a member of a small group of women exhibiting in 1930, L'Engle subscribed to a practice of evolving "a more modern American style," one that was more in keeping with 20th Century American life than are the prevailing Continental designs." Noting that L'Engle seemed to have stopped making pure abstractions, Helen Appleton Read of the Brooklyn Daily Eagle wrote in 1931 that L'Engle appeared to have been "always at heart a painter with a painter's sensuous enjoyment of the medium itself." In 1932, when L'Engle showed with Adelaide Lawson and Alice Newton a critic for the New York Evening Post said "her interest in abstractions has enabled her to build up a solid structure of organic design. In 1934, 1936, and again in 1943 critics called attention to her skill in composition. During the late 1940s L'Engle painted pure abstractions that Howard Devree called "bright" and "well-organized." The painting, "Two Nuns," (at left) shows L'Engle's representational style of the 1930s and 1940s and her "Graffiti," (at right) is an example of a pure abstraction from the late 1940s and early 1950s. Later in the 1950s she made montages incorporating metal foil, wire, wood, plaster, and broken glass as well as paint. She became interested in archaic Greek statues in the 1960s and, during that period, exhibited drawings of pieces she found in the Athens Museum.

== Personal life and family ==
L'Engle was the daughter of a prosperous Manhattan real estate broker, Charles Stelle Brown (1851-1935), known as C. S. Brown, and his wife Lucy Barnes Brown (1859-1924). C. S. Brown began business in 1893 and continued working as a broker specializing in valuations and appraisals for the next 41 years. The business he ran is now known as Brown Harris Stevens. Lucy B. Brown made her name when in 1895 she won the first U. S. women's amateur golfing championship. L'Engle had three brothers, Archibald Manning Brown, an architect; Lathrop Brown, a real estate executive who became a U.S Congressman for New York; and Charles Stelle Brown, Jr., who succeeded his father in the real estate business.

In 1914 she married the artist William L'Engle in a civil ceremony in Paris where both were studying art. They were married a second time in a religious ceremony shortly afterwards. The couple spent a year on an automotive tour of Europe. Their first child, Madeleine, was born in Marseille shortly before their return to the U.S. in 1915. (Note: This Madeleine should not be confused with a near-contemporary woman of the same name who is a well-known author of young adult fiction.) After returning to the U.S. the L'Engles lived in Manhattan. Her parents usually spent the warm months in their mansion in Mount Kisco, New York and the cold ones at a club on Jekyll Island, Georgia, leaving their Manhattan apartment available for the L'Engles to use. The couple's second child, Camille, was born in 1917. In 1923 the family spent the summer in Cavalaire, a small coastal town near the Côte d'Azur in Provence, with Albert Gleizes and his wife. The following year they moved their summer quarters from Provincetown to Truro. During the 1930s and 1940s, the L'Engles traveled in Cuba, Mexico, and New Mexico as well as St. Augustine, Florida. After William L'Engle died in 1957 Lucy L'Engle opened his Provincetown studio as a gallery to show his work. She also donated many of his paintings and drawings to museums.
