= Blanche Lazzell =

American painter (1878–1956)

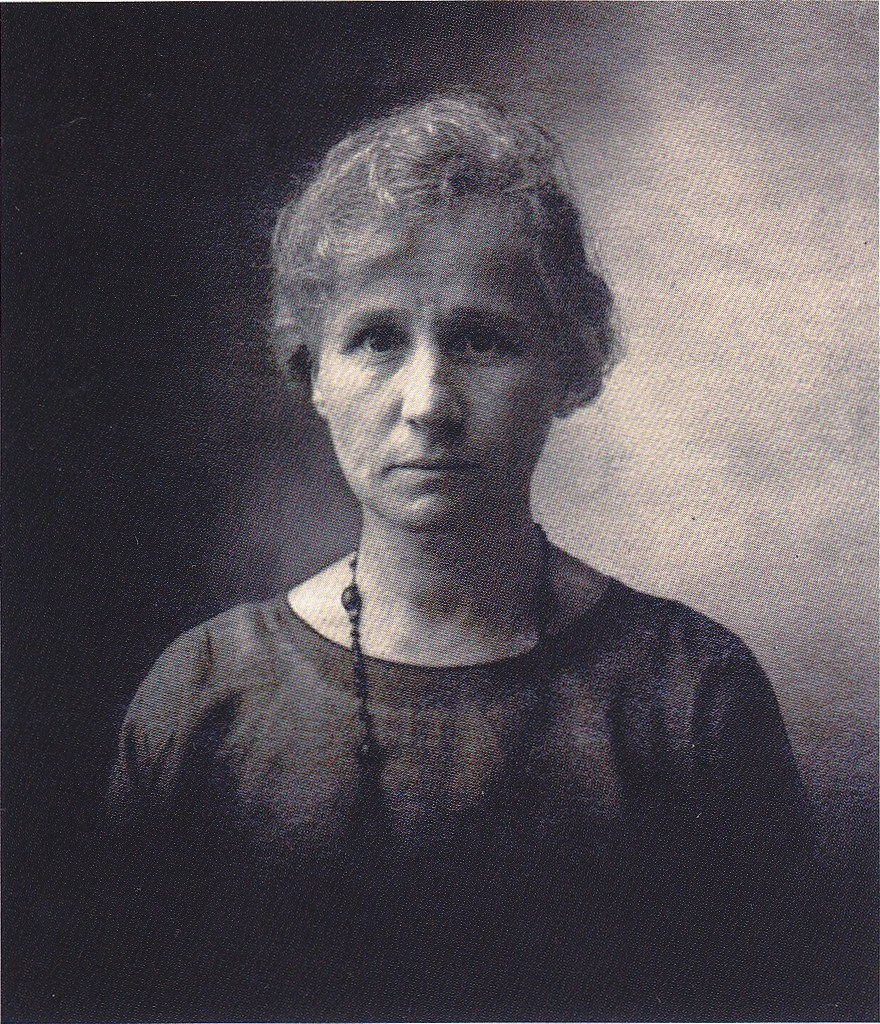
- Lazzell in Manhattan, circa 1908
- Born: Nettie Blanche Lazzell; October 10, 1878; Monongalia County, West Virginia
- Died: June 1, 1956 (aged 77); Bourne, Massachusetts
- Known for: Printmaking, painting, etching
- Notable work: The Monongahela (1926)
- Movement: Modernism

Blanche Lazzell (October 10, 1878 – June 1, 1956) was an American painter, printmaker and designer. Known especially for her white-line woodcuts, she was an early modernist American artist, bringing elements of Cubism and abstraction into her art.

Born in a small farming community in West Virginia, Lazzell traveled to Europe twice, studying in Paris with French artists Albert Gleizes, Fernand Léger, and André Lhote. In 1915, she began spending her summers in the Cape Cod art community of Provincetown, Massachusetts, and eventually settled there permanently. She was one of the founding members of the Provincetown Printers, a group of artists who experimented with a white-line woodcut technique based on the Japanese ukiyo-e woodblock prints.

== Biography ==
=== Early life and education ===
Nettie Blanche Lazzell was born on a farm near Maidsville, West Virginia, to Mary Prudence Pope and Cornelius Carhart Lazzell. Her father was a direct descendant of Reverend Thomas and Hannah Lazzell, pioneers who settled in Monongalia County after the American Revolutionary War. The Lazzells were devout Methodists, attending the Bethel Methodist Episcopal Church. The ninth of ten children, she was nicknamed "Pet" by her older brother Rufus, a name that her family would continue to use throughout her life. She grew up on the 200 acre (0.81 km^{2}) family farm, attending a one-room schoolhouse on the property where students from the first through eighth grades were taught from October through February. Her mother died when she was twelve.

When Lazzell was fifteen, she enrolled in the West Virginia Conference Seminary (now West Virginia Wesleyan College) in Buckhannon. Probably sometime prior to her entering the Seminary she became partially deaf, although the exact origin of her condition is unclear. In 1894 she sought treatment from a Baltimore doctor who blamed her deafness on catarrh.

In 1899, Lazzell enrolled in the South Carolina Co-educational Institute. Upon graduation later that year, she became a teacher at the Red Oaks School in Ramsey, South Carolina. In spring of 1900, she returned to Maidsville, where she tutored her younger sister, Bessie.

Lazzell was matriculated into the West Virginia University (WVU) in 1901 and decided to study fine art. While her education was paid for by her father, she kept a strict account of her expenditures and took a job coloring photographs at Frieds, a studio in Morgantown. She took drawing and art history classes from William J. Leonard and studied with Eva E. Hubbard. In June 1905 Lazzell was graduated, earning her degree in fine arts. She continued to study at WVU off and on until 1909, furthering her art studies and twice substituting as a painting teacher for Hubbard. During this time she learned ceramics, gold etching, and china decoration.

She enrolled in the Art Students League of New York in 1908 where she studied under painters Kenyon Cox and William Merritt Chase. Georgia O'Keeffe attended the league during the same period, but it is not clear whether the two attended classes together. In 1908, Lazzell's father died and she left the Art Students League.

=== Travels to Europe ===
Lazzell boarded the SS Ivernia on July 3, 1912, bound for Europe on a summer tour arranged by the American Travel Club. The tour began in England and continued through the Netherlands, Belgium, and Italy, where Lazzell studied the architecture of churches. In August she left the tour and traveled to Paris, where she stayed at a pension in Montparnasse on the Left Bank. She attended lectures by Florence Heywood and Rossiter Howard, avoided the cafe life, and joined the Students Hostel on Boulevard Saint-Michel. While in Paris, Lazzell took classes at the Académie de la Grande Chaumière, Académie Julian, and Académie Delécluse, eventually settling in at the Académie Moderne where she studied with post-impressionist painter Charles Guérin and David Rosen. Lazzell felt most comfortable at the Moderne, which was associated with the Parisian avant-garde. She embarked upon a six-week sketching tour of Italy with four other young women in February 1913. The quintet returned to Paris via Germany where Lazzell partook in her first glass of beer in Munich. In April she visited an ear specialist who removed a growth from the back of her throat, resulting in what she characterized as "a slight improvement" in her hearing. She continued to study with Guérin, who recognized Lazzell's inclination for landscape art. Lazzell extended her stay in France and attended lectures at the Louvre concerning Flemish paintings, Dutch art and the Italian Renaissance. She returned to the United States at the end of September, sailing from London on the SS Arabic of the White Star Line.

Upon returning to Morgantown, Lazzell focused on painting and lived with her sister Bessie. She held a solo exhibition in December 1914 that included her sketches and paintings. Lazzell rented a studio where she taught art while supporting herself through the sales of hand-painted china.

=== Provincetown ===
Lacking artistic stimulation in Morgantown, Lazzell journeyed to Provincetown, Massachusetts, in 1915. Already an artists' colony, Provincetown was a mecca for European artists escaping World War I. Stella Johnson and Jessie Fremont Herring, two of Lazzell's companions from her tour in Italy, were already in Provincetown and Lazzell stayed with Johnson's mother. Lazzell took a morning outdoor painting class that summer from Charles Webster Hawthorne at his Cape Cod School of Art where she was exposed to Fauvist color and technique. She returned to Morgantown in the autumn and held an exhibition in her studio that October.

Lazzell returned to Provincetown the following summer and requested that painting instructor, Oliver Chaffee, teach her the white-line woodcut technique innovated by B.J.O. Nordfeldt and adopted by a group of artists who had spent the previous winter in Provincetown. The white-line woodcuts were inspired by Japanese ukiyo-e woodblock prints, but only used a single block of wood. Designs were etched into the surface of woodblocks, with the incised lines separating sections of the blocks. The sections were individually painted and printed onto paper with the carved portions forming white lines. Lazzell and other artists specializing in the white-line technique formed the Provincetown Printers, an artist collective that later would earn national recognition. Toward the close of 1916 she traveled to Manhattan where she studied with Homer Boss and did an analysis of color with William E. Schumacher. Two of her pieces in the white-line style were exhibited in the Provincetown Art Association's annual show in 1917.

Originality, Simplicity, Freedom of Expression, and above all Sincerity, with a clean cut block, are characteristics of a good wood block print.

— Blanche Lazzell

In the summer of 1917, she spent time at Byrdcliffe Colony, an artists' colony in Woodstock, New York. There she studied with William Schumacher, under whom she made her first color woodcut. She also studied with William Zorach and Andrew Dasburg. In the summer of 1918 Lazzell moved to Provincetown permanently, converting an old fish house overlooking the Provincetown Harbor into a studio. She spent the winters in Morgantown and Manhattan until 1922, always returning to Provincetown for the summer. In addition to her involvement with the Provincetown Printers, Lazzell was a member of the Provincetown Art Association and the Sail Loft Club, Provincetown's women's art club.

The Monongahela (1926) is a color woodblock print utilizing the white-line technique and depicting the Monongahela River in Morgantown

Although the bohemian atmosphere of Provincetown contrasted with Lazzell's church-going conservative demeanor, she wove herself into a tight circle of friends, including Ada Gilmore, Agnes Weinrich, and Otto Karl Knaths. She became close to Simeon C. Smith, a former WVU English professor who had retired to Provincetown. She spent Thanksgiving with his family in 1918 and while the couple became romantically entangled, they never married.

In 1919 Lazzell was featured in an exhibition in Manhattan at the Touchstone Gallery alongside Weinrich, Mary Kirkup, and Flora Schoenfeld. Later that year, the Provincetown Printers were featured at the Detroit Institute of Arts exhibition "Wood Block Prints in Color by American Artists". That show included Lazzell's depiction of the Monongahela River in Morgantown The Monongahela, which was cut at Byrdcliffe in William E. Schumacher's studio. Critics and galleries associated the Provincetown Printers with modernist schools of painting and the artist collective continued to receive national exposure over the next few years with exhibitions in Chicago, Los Angeles, Philadelphia, Baltimore, and New Orleans.

Lazzell turned her old fish shack into a personal space and built large flower boxes around her studio, allowing morning glory and Madeira vines to grow up to the roof. Her studio's garden became a local attraction and she hosted teas for which she made homemade candy. During this time Lazzell produced white-line prints and flower monoprints and she taught painting and block printing classes.

=== Return to Europe ===
Lazzell returned to Europe in 1923 with Tannahill and Kaesche, touring Italy and spending two months in Cassis before settling in Paris late that summer. Her friend Flora Schoenfeld convinced her to dye her hair red in the fashion of many women in their circle. While in Paris Lazzell studied Cubism and geometric abstraction alongside Fernand Léger, André Lhote, and Albert Gleizes. Lazzell's work was exhibited at the Salon d'Automne and the American Women's Club in 1923. She returned to Morgantown in August 1924 after her sister Bessie had given birth to a son.

=== Later years ===
Lazzell grew close to her niece, Frances Reed, for whom she was a mentor and role model. For six years she served on the committee of selection for the Annual Modern Exhibition. After her return to Provincetown in 1926, Lazzell tore down her studio and had a new building constructed, as the fish house was too cold during the winter. She participated in a show called "Fifty Prints of the Year" where she debuted her compositions The Violet Jug and Trees. She was particularly influenced by Gleizes and produced a series of abstract Synthetic cubist paintings based on the golden ratio, including Painting VIII.

Lazzell was a member of the international arts group Société Anonyme and was asked by artist and patron Katherine Dreier to be on its board of directors in 1928. Lazzell later joined the New York Society of Women Artists and the Society of Independent Artists. Lazzell began incorporating abstract designs into her woodblocks and created designs for hooked rugs toward the end of the decade. She returned to Morgantown in the winter of 1929 and offered art lessons. Among her students was Ella Sophonisba Hergesheimer.

In 1934, Lazzell was one of two West Virginians who received Federal Art Project grants through the Works Progress Administration. That same year she created a mural for a court room in the Monongalia County Courthouse entitled, Justice. The mural took fourteen weeks to complete. The mural is currently displayed at the Art Museum of West Virginia University in Morgantown, WV. She continued experimenting with woodprints and, in 1935, studied with the renowned German abstract expressionist Hans Hofmann in Provincetown. Hofmann's push/pull spatial theory is evident in the asymmetry of her later works. Lazzell's studies of flowers were inspired by her lavish potted gardens, such as Star Phlox (1931). Her 1948 floral print, Red and White Petunia, won first prize at the American Color Print Society exhibition. A collection of her prints are housed at the Art Museum of West Virginia University.

In 1956, Lazzell's health began to fail and she was hospitalized in Bourne, Massachusetts, toward the end of May for a suspected stroke. After experiencing a documented stroke, Lazzell died on June 1. She is interred next to her father in Bethel Cemetery in Maidsville.

== Artistic style ==
"Lazzell's Cuboid paintings and drawings of nudes, done in Paris in the 20s, are handled with animation, and her strong representational drawings of hills in West Virginia and backyards in Provincetown show a fine sense of rhythmical massing." —Grace Glueck

While Lazzell is most well known for her white-line woodcuts, she also created ceramics, hooked rugs, paintings, and gouache studies. The subjects of her paintings and prints included landscape scenery and harbor scenes in Provincetown as well as flowers and still lifes. These and her abstract works incorporated elements of both Synthetic and Analytic cubism and frequently comprised arrangements of vibrantly colored geometric shapes. She was among the earliest women artists in the United States to work in a modernist style. The two following quotes by the artist give a sense of her relationship toward abstraction:

When we moderns paint a realistic object we get beneath the surface and give you the very spiritual substance of it.

— Blanche Lazzell, 1927

We do not paint an orange for the sake of making something that looks like an orange however beautiful it might be, but we can use the orange as a means of expressing a certain note in our composition. That is, a means, but never an end in itself.

— Blanche Lazzell, 1927

Lazzell's paintings demonstrated a rich and nuanced use of color. She preferred French watercolor pigments that, alongside the grain of the woodblocks, created embossed lines and striated patterns. Typically the woodblocks she created were made from cherry or basswood and she only pulled three or four prints from each woodblock. From 1916 to 1955, Lazzell created 138 woodblocks. Modern exhibitions of Lazzell's artworks have included the wood blocks themselves.

Although she was a pioneer in the white-line woodcut technique and played a role in the development of abstract art in the United States, Lazzell's work faded into obscurity for a time. With a resurgence of interest in the modern print, and especially the white-line woodcut, Lazzell's popularity has surged lately. On August 3, 2012, Lazzell's print 'Sail Boat' reached $106,200 at auction.
