= Dorothy Fratt =

American painter

Dorothy Fratt-Cooper
- Born: Dorothy Fratt; August 10, 1923; Washington, D.C.
- Died: July 7, 2017 (aged 93)
- Movement: Washington Color School

Dorothy Fratt - Cooper (August 10, 1923 - July 7, 2017) was an American artist.

A native of Washington, D.C., Fratt was the daughter of a photographer and journalist on the staff of The Washington Post. She received scholarships to the Mount Vernon College for Women, the Corcoran School of Art, and the art school at The Phillips Collection, and she studied painting with Karl Knaths and Nikolai Cikovsky. Her first solo exhibition came in 1946, at the Washington City Library, and she has since shown work in numerous solo and group exhibitions. From 1946 to 1951 Fratt taught at Mount Vernon College for Women; in 1958 she settled in Phoenix, Arizona, and began teaching color theory and painting privately. She has received many awards, the first coming in a student show at the Corcoran when she was fifteen. Collections with examples of her work include the Phoenix Art Museum, the Tucson Museum of Art, and the Museum of Northern Arizona. Fratt's non-objective style is derived from Abstract Expressionism. In 2000 she received the Arizona Governor's Artist of the Year Award for her work. She was married to Curtis Calvin Cooper, Jr., a rancher and farmer, until his death in 2008.
