= Provincetown Printers =

Coordinates: 42.058°N 70.179°W

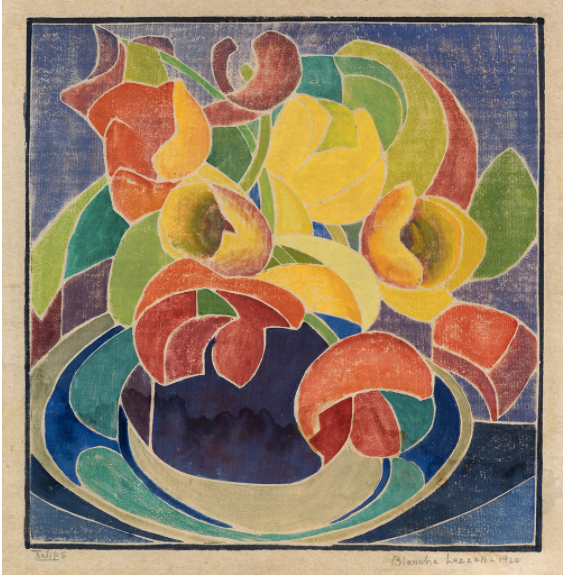
Blanche Lazzell, Tulips, white line woodblock print - called the Provincetown Print technique, 1920

Provincetown Printers were a group of printmakers, most of them women, who created art using woodcut techniques in Provincetown, Massachusetts during the early 20th-century. It was the first group of its kind in the United States, developed in an area when European and American avant-garde artists visited in number after World War I. The "Provincetown Print", a white-line woodcut print, was attributed to this group. Rather than creating separate woodblocks for each color, one block was made and painted. Small groves between the elements of the design created the white line. Because the artists often used soft colors, they sometimes have the appearance of a watercolor painting.

Bror Julius Olsson Nordfeldt has been credited with developing the technique, based upon Japanese ukiyo-e woodblock printing, though there is evidence that a lesser-known Provincetown artist, Edith Lake Wilkinson, was making white-line prints in 1913, a year earlier than Nordfeldt's first known efforts. Blanche Lazzell is said to have mastered the technique.

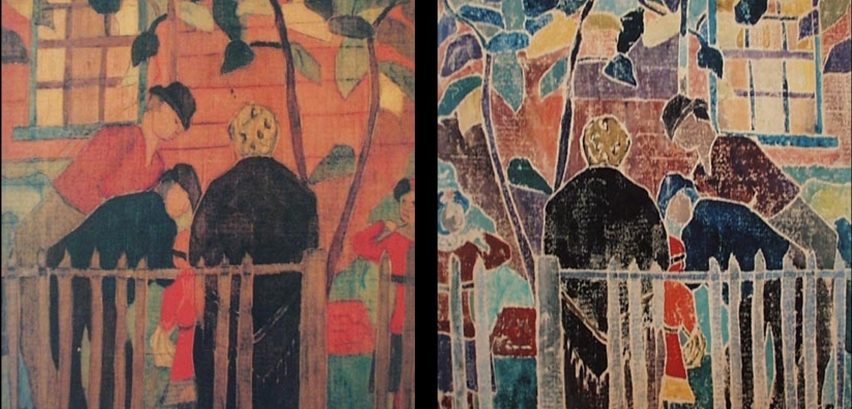
Agnes Weinrich, Broken Fence, a white-line woodblock made in or before 1917; at left: the woodblock itself; at right: a print pulled from the woodblook.

Other artists in the group included Ethel Mars, Ada Gilmore, Mildred McMillen, Maud Hunt Squire, Ellen Ravenscroft, Karl Knaths, Juliette S. Nichols, Flora Schofield, Agnes Weinrich, Tod Lindenmuth Ferol Sibley Warthen, Marguerite Thompson Zorach and William Zorach. Edna Boies Hopkins, a friend of Squires and Mars from the Art Academy of Cincinnati, also visited the community.

Bill Evaul, a writer for Print Review in the late 1970s, was asked to write an article about "printmaking in Provincetown", but by that time many of the artists were no longer alive. Through research with Myron Stout and meeting with some surviving members, like Ferol Sibley Warthen, he learned the history about the Provincetown Print and later learned how to create works of art with the technique. Since then, he has promoted the white line woodcut technique in his historical research paper "Provincetown Printers: Genesis of a Unique Woodcut Tradition", taught and lectured about the technique, and has created and shown his version of the Provincetown Prints in exhibits.

An exhibit of 75 works of art from this group was held at the Smithsonian American Art Museum from September 9, 1983 to January 8, 1984.

This technique is continued today by the Australian artist Cressida Campbell.

== See also ==
- Provincetown Art Association and Museum
- Ella Sophonisba Hergesheimer
- Mary Tannahill
- Anna Heyward Taylor
- Cressida Campbell
