= Pencil drawing =

Drawings created by using pencils containing lead, graphite, or another material

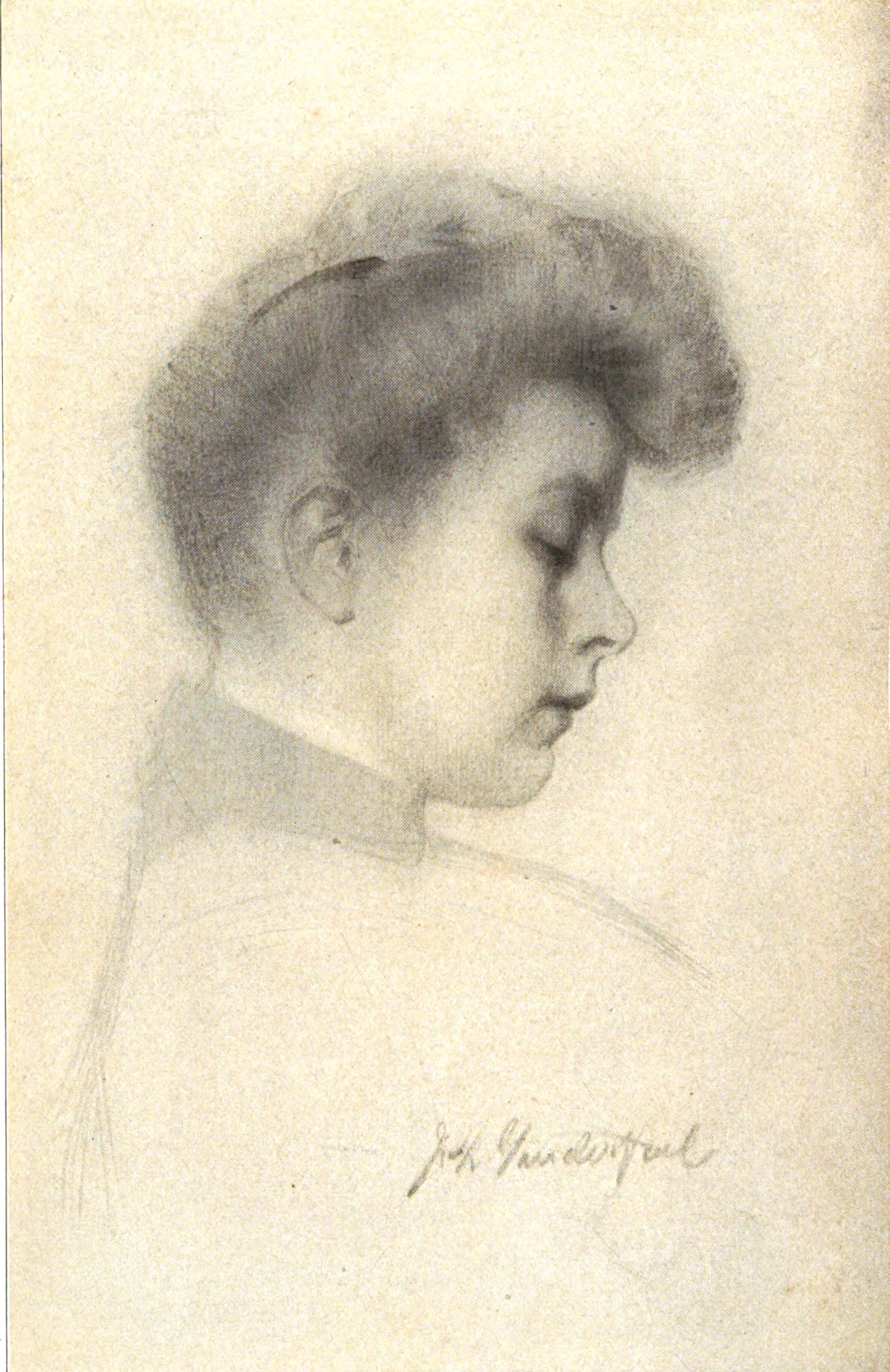
Pencil drawing by John Vanderpoel (1857–1911)

A pencil drawing is a drawing that is made with a pencil (which is composed of wood and graphite).

== History ==
Pencil drawings were not known before the 17th century, with the modern concept of pencil drawings taking shape in the 18th and 19th centuries. Pencil drawings succeeded the older metalpoint drawing stylus, which used metal instead of graphite.

Modern artists continue to use the graphite pencil for artworks and sketches.

== Modern pencil drawing ==
=== Color pencil drawing ===
Drawings that are done by color pencils bring a more lively appearance and make them look more realistic.

=== Charcoal pencil drawing ===
With the use of charcoal pencils, artists create monochrome drawings.
