= Oliver Newberry Chaffee =

American painter

Oliver Newberry Chaffee Jr.
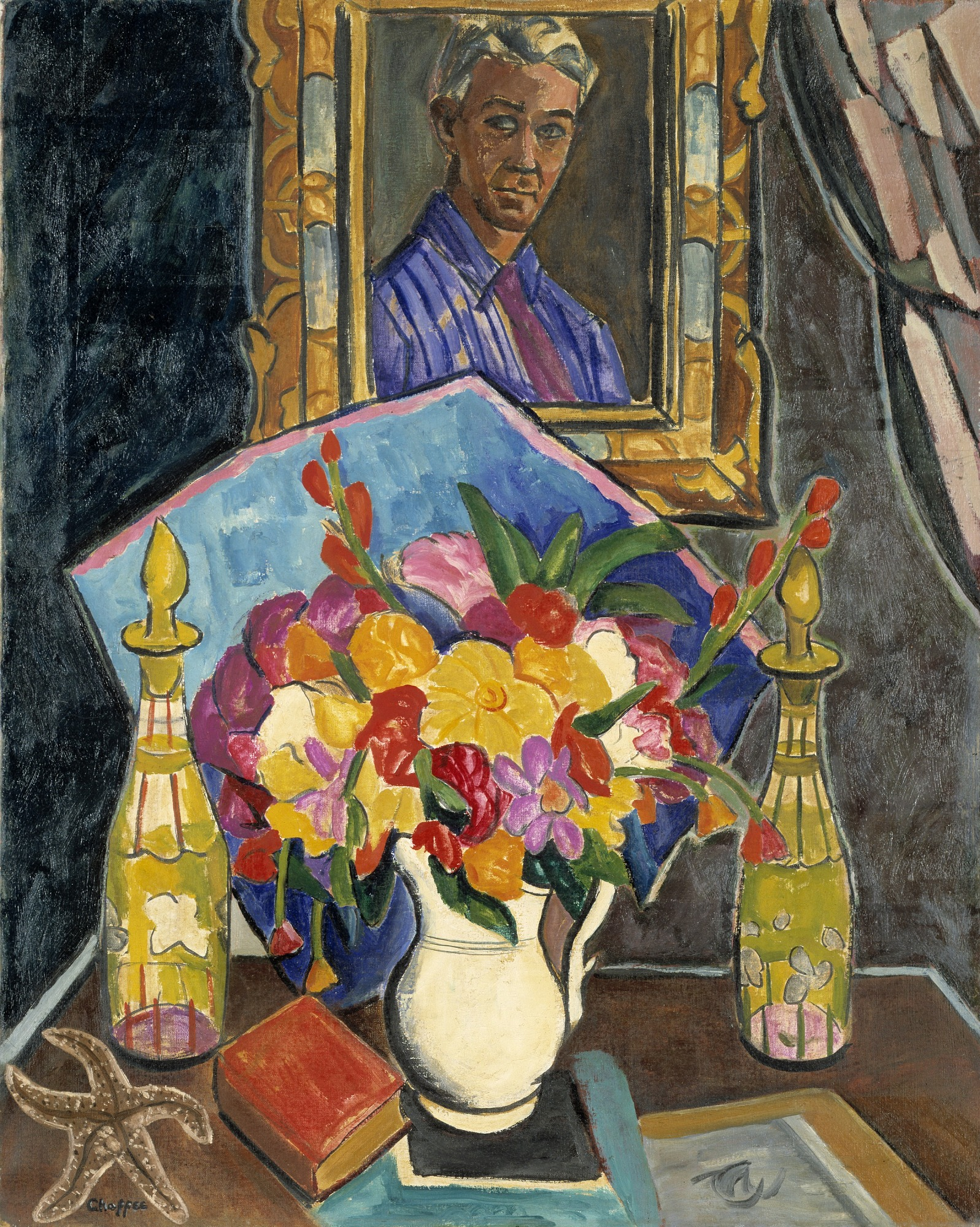
- "Myself in the Mirror", c. 1926
- Born: January 23, 1881; Detroit, Michigan, U.S.
- Died: April 25, 1944 (aged 63); Asheville, North Carolina, U.S.
- Resting place: Winthrop Street Cemetery, Provincetown, Massachusetts, U.S.
- Education: Detroit Fine Arts Academy, Parsons School of Design, Art Students League of New York, Cape Cod School of Art, Académie Julian
- Movement: Modernist, Fauvism, Abstract
- Spouse(s): Mary Georgia Cole (m. 1912–c. 1923; divorce), Ada Gilmore (m. 1926–1944; death)

Oliver Newberry Chaffee Jr. (1881 – 1944) is an American Modernist painter and printmaker. He is known for his connections to Provincetown, Massachusetts, where he help found the Provincetown Art Association.

== Biography ==
Oliver Newberry Chaffee Jr. was born on 23 January 1881, in Detroit, Michigan. He was from an affluent family, and his father left him a trust fund after he died, allowing Chaffee to pursue his art.

In the late 1890s, he entered the Detroit Fine Arts Academy (also known as the Detroit Museum School). In 1903, Chaffee moved to New York City to attended the New York School of Art (now known as Parsons School of Design), and studied under William Merritt Chase and Robert Henri. Followed by study at the Art Students League of New York, under Charles Webster Hawthorne. Hawthorne encouraged painting outdoors, and in the summer of 1904, Chaffee joined Hawthorne at the Cape Cod School of Art in Provincetown.

Around 1906, Chaffee moved to Paris. Chaffee’s early paintings were impressionistic. After Chaffee studied in Paris at Académie Julian and after seeing the work of the Fauves like Paul Cezanne, Vincent van Gogh, and Paul Gauguin, as well as by Picasso, his own work evolved into more abstraction. He also developed more color and light in his work as he gained experience and more travel. During World War I, he fled from Paris.

His work was part of the 1913 Armory Show, the first American modern art exhibit in New York City, which later travelled to Boston and Chicago. Chaffee spent his summers in Cape Cod. He moved to Provincetown in 1914, and help found the Provincetown Art Association.

From 1921 to 1923, Chaffee and his first wife Mary moved to France. They maintained an apartment in Paris and a house in Vence. The couple divorced, and Chaffee eventually remarried, and he lived in Vence until 1928. In the spring of 1928, he and his second wife Ada moved to Provincetown, splitting time also in Owls Head, Maine and winters in Ormond Beach.

== Death and legacy ==
Chaffee died in 1944 in Asheville, North Carolina, and he is buried at the Winthrop Street Cemetery in Provincetown.

Caffee's work is included in public museum collections, including at the Smithsonian American Art Museum, National Gallery of Art. The Frick Art Reference Library holds files of work by Chaffee. The Archives of American Art in Washington DC, holds three collections about Chaffee.

Solveiga Rush (1930–2020) was an art historian and Professor Emerita at the University of Cincinnati, she had researched and wrote about Chaffee. In 1991, Chaffee had a retrospective exhibition at Taft Museum of Art in Cincinnati, Ohio, and Rush wrote the accompaniment book.

== Personal life ==
On January 4, 1912, he married artist Mary Georgia Holbrook Cole, whom he met in Cape Cod. Together, they had a daughter, Jane Merrick. The marriage ended in divorce around 1923.

His second marriage in 1926 was to artist Ada Gilmore. She had studied at School of the Art Institute of Chicago, also under Robert Henri.
