= Ada Gilmore =

American painter (1883–1955)

- Born: 1883; Kalamazoo, Michigan, U.S.
- Died: 1955 (aged 71–72); Provincetown, Massachusetts, U.S.
- Other name: Ada Gilmore Chaffee
- Education: Belfast School of Art, School of the Art Institute of Chicago
- Spouse: Oliver Newberry Chaffee (m. 1926–1944; death)

Ada Gilmore (married name Ada Gilmore Chaffee; 1883–1955) was an American watercolorist and printmaker, one of the Provincetown Printers.

== Early life and education ==
Gilmore was born in Kalamazoo, Michigan. As a pre-teen, she and her three siblings became orphaned, and she moved to Belfast, Ireland, to live with an aunt. She was a student at the Belfast School of Art, and then at the School of the Art Institute of Chicago, from 1906 to 1912, under the tutelage of Robert Henri. There, she and her long-time companion, Mildred McMillen first met.

After completing their studies, Gilmore and McMillen moved to Long Island and from there to Paris; In 1915, World War I forced them to return to the US and they settled in Provincetown, Massachusetts. With McMillen, Ethel Mars, and Maud Hunt Squire, they formed a group known as the Provincetown Printers.

== Career ==
In 1923, on another visit to Paris, Gilmore re-encountered Oliver Newberry Chaffee, Jr., who had studied with her under Robert Henri in New York City. They married in 1926, and under Chaffee's influence, Gilmore began concentrating more on her painting and less on her prints.

Gilmore exhibited her prints at the 1915 Panama–Pacific International Exposition (PPIE). With the other members of the Provincetown Printers, she developed a new style of printmaking using multiple colors on a single printing block, separated by white lines. Her prints have been described as "softer and more imaginative than the severely geometric" prints of the other members of the collective.

== Death and legacy ==
Gilmore and Chaffee returned to Provincetown in 1928 from France, where she died in 1955. Chaffee had died in 1944 in Asheville, North Carolina.

Gilmore's works are included in the collections of the Smithsonian American Art Museum, the National Gallery of Canada, the Herbert F. Johnson Museum of Art, the Cleveland Museum of Art, the Indianapolis Museum of Art, and the Museum of Fine Arts, Boston.
