= Karl Knaths =

American painter (1891–1971)

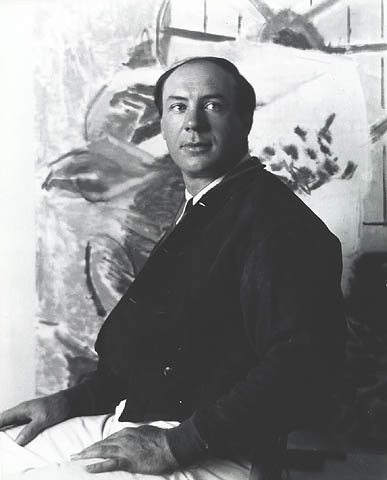
- Karl Knaths, 1930
- Born: Otto Karl Knaths; October 21, 1891; Eau Claire, Wisconsin, US
- Died: March 9, 1971 (aged 79); Provincetown, Massachusetts, US
- Other names: Otto Knaths, Otto Karl Knaths, Otto George Knaths, Karl O. Knaths, Otto K. Knaths
- Education: School of the Art Institute of Chicago
- Known for: Modern art
- Movement: Cubism, Abstract art
- Spouse: Helen Lena Weinrich Knaths (1876-1978)
- Patrons: Duncan Phillips

Karl Knaths (October 21, 1891 – March 9, 1971) was an American artist whose personal approach to the Cubist aesthetic led him to create paintings that, while abstract, contained readily identifiable subjects. In addition to the Cubist painters, his work shows influence by Paul Cézanne, Wassily Kandinsky, Utagawa Kuniyoshi, Paul Klee, Stuart Davis, and Agnes Weinrich. It is nonetheless, in use of heavy line, rendering of depth, disciplined treatment of color, and architecture of planes, distinctly his own.

== Early life and work ==
Karl Knaths was born October 21, 1891, in Eau Claire, Wisconsin. His parents were Otto Julius Knaths and Maria Theresa Knaths. Shortly after Knaths's birth the family moved to Portage, Wisconsin where he spent his childhood years. When he was in his late teens his father died and he became apprenticed to his mother's brother, George Dietrich, in the baking trade. Although he had begun making sketches, he had no art instruction and little time for self-instruction. While attending Portage High School he met the local author, Zona Gale. She encouraged his interest and, upon his graduation in 1910, both convinced his uncle to release him from apprenticeship and introduced him to Dudley Crafts Watson of the Milwaukee Art Institute. During the next year, he studied art at the institute. He obtained the job by which he supported himself when Gale introduced him to Laura Sherry, the director of the Wisconsin Players. Despite his youth and inexperience, Sherry took him on as caretaker of the playhouse and one of its set designers. In 1911, on advice from Gale and Craft, Knaths began studies at the School of the Art Institute of Chicago. There, he mainly supported himself as janitor's assistant but when the 1913 Armory Show came to town he landed a job at the show as one of the guards. The show was his first substantial exposure to European modernism and he later reported that the experience both confused and awed him. Uncomfortable with most of the work on display, he found much to like in the works of Cézanne, particularly the blocks of muted color out of which he built his compositions.

In 1917 Knaths rejoined the Wisconsin Players as the group's scenery painter during a tour of East Coast theaters. When the Players arrived in Provincetown, Massachusetts for a performance of Gale's Mr. Pitt Knaths recognized it as a place where he could successfully practice his vocation. After two years of military service Knaths spent a short time studying art in New York City and then, in 1919, moved to Provincetown, which became his principal residence for the rest of his life. In the early twentieth century Provincetown was a prosperous fishing town which attracted artists and theater people from New York's Greenwich Village as summer residents. On or soon after his arrival he met two sisters, Helen and Agnes Weinrich of the Provincetown Printers. The sisters had grown up on a prosperous Iowa farm, daughters of German immigrant parents. When in their 20s they had accompanied their father on a trip to Germany where Helen studied music and Agnes painting. Their father having died, they received an inheritance which permitted them to live and travel on their own and they returned to Germany and France to study further. In 1914 the sisters began spending the warm months of the year in Provincetown and, through contact with European expatriates who settled there during World War I, Agnes learned to employ Modernist and particularly Cubist techniques in her work. After their first meeting, Agnes helped Knaths to develop his personal style of painting and over time they developed a close and mutually beneficial working relationship. In 1922 Knaths married Helen and moved into the house that the sisters had rented. He was then 30, Helen 45, and Agnes 46. Agnes remained a member of the Knaths's household for the rest of her life.

Knaths's earliest work has the strong lines, blocks of muted colors, and juxtaposition of rectangular and curvilinear forms which characterize his mature style. One of his early paintings, Horse Barns, Provincetown (1919, gouache, 7x8") contains three barn structures within a small grove of trees and bushes. It shows the influence of Cézanne and is not notably Cubist. The coloration is low-key in green, purple, and ochre hues. The composition has sweeping rounded shapes beside heavily outlined rhombuses and other quadrilateral shapes. It has a painterly, nearly impressionist feel and, despite the subject matter, might as well be a still life as a landscape.

== Mature style ==
Knaths's mature style emerged in the early 1930s. It evolved, he said, as he "learned to move slowly from color relations, to line sequence, to better spacing, proportions, to a thematic play of shapes." During the 1920s he had studied, and sometimes translated from German, theoretical publications of theorists and artists, including Carl Einstein, Wilhelm Ostwald, Piet Mondrian, Wassily Kandinsky, and Jay Hambidge. He later reported that he was particularly impressed by ideas presented by Gino Severini in Du cubisme au classicisme; esthétique du compas et du nombre (Paris, J. Povolozky & Cie, 1921). While these books deal mainly with color, proportion, and Bauhaus design theory, Knaths was also interested in the relationship between music and painting and in this, it is likely his wife, Helen, who was a conservatory-trained musician and whose piano playing he enjoyed almost daily, was an influence.

Knaths's interests in theories of color, proportion, and music bore fruit in a system that, while it was mathematically influenced and employed a formal method of color selection, retained the lyricism that marks most of his work. The methodology he followed rather enhanced than inhibited his freedom of expression. In his case, as with many poets and musicians, a voluntary submission to rules of form and design seems to have helped rather than hindered him in achieving his goals. An art historian summarized this lyricism, writing that Knaths's approach to Cubism was romantic rather than academic or literal. Another wrote that Knaths's paintings are personal expressions of both theory and feeling which arise from his love of nature, his close bond with his community, and a "poetic meditation on human life." A third simply calls Knaths a poet of painting. Knaths himself wrote on this subject: "Systems are only bricks and lumber — of themselves they cannot encompass the immeasurable spiritual qualities that go into a successful picture. The unlooked-for things that happen in the process of work are the important ones." A detailed description of Knaths's application of theory to his practice of art is given in Four American Expressionists: Doris Caesar, Chaim Gross, Karl Knaths, Abraham Rattner, pp. 16–17 (New York, Whitney Museum of American Art, 1959) and also in "Karl Knaths To Teach at Art Gallery," Alice Graeme, The Washington Post, February 20, 1938, p. TT5.

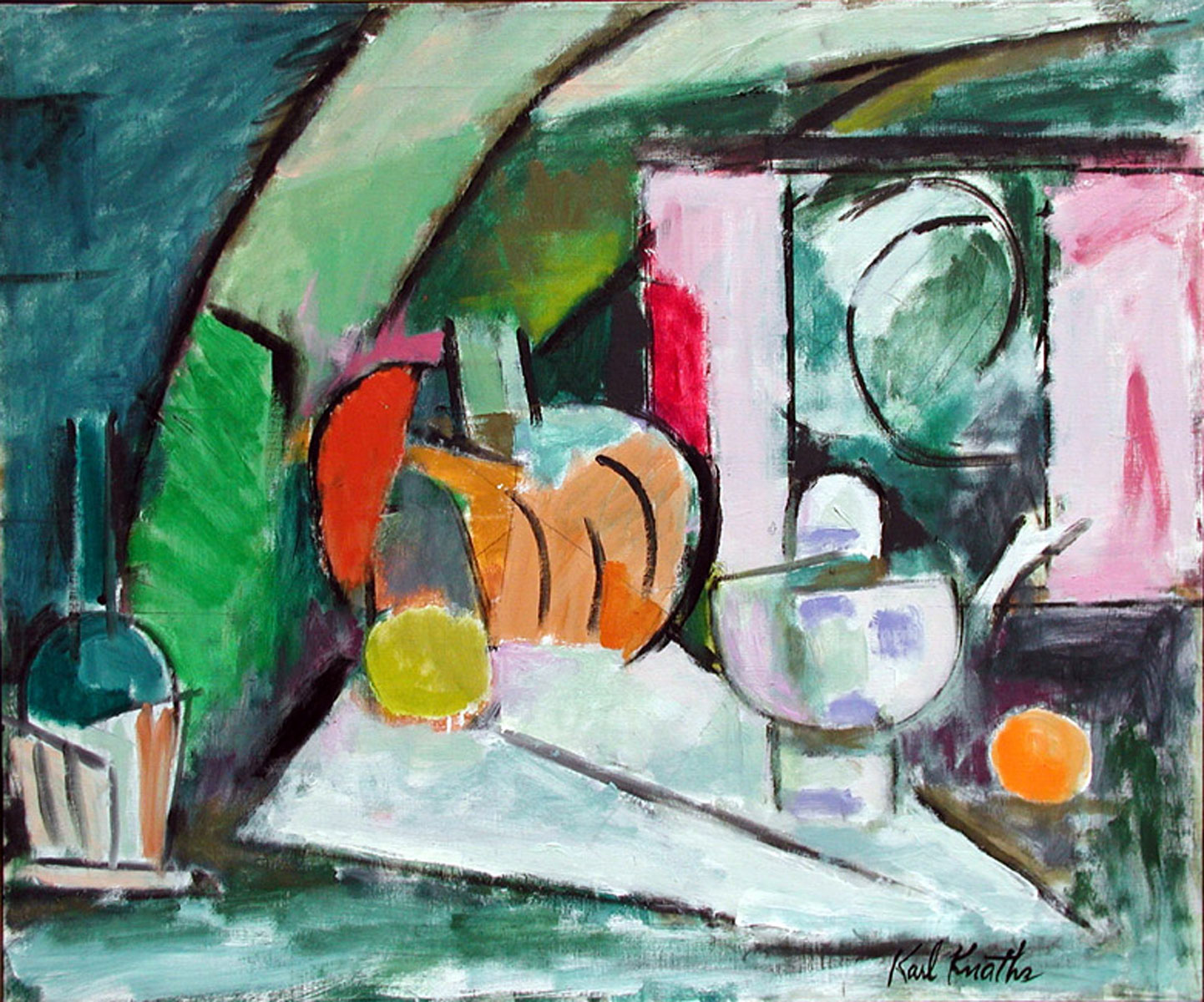
Karl Knaths, painting of 1964 entitled Pumpkin; 30" x 36"; oil on canvas

A painting from Knaths's mature period, Pumpkin, shows his integration of the abstract Cubist idiom with a representational tabletop still life. Strong calligraphic lines demarcate planes of both bright and muted colors and the composition can be viewed as both two- and three-dimensional: either blocks of color juxtaposed in rectangular and curvilinear shapes or a foreground still-life grouping — a table holding bottle, glass, pieces of fruit, and pumpkin — within an abstract enclosed space with what appear to be windows or panels on a rear wall. The background at left bears similarity to a wall in the artist's studio shown in a photo of 1961 and this suggests that the windows or panels at right might be paintings.

Once he had established his mature style Knaths allowed himself freedom to range widely from its core elements. This is most obvious during his mid-1930s employment as artist in the WPA Federal Art Project and the Section of Painting and Sculpture. His post office murals have the same social realist style as most of the others produced by New Deal artists. See for example his Frontier Mail in the post office at Rehoboth Beach, Delaware. It can also be seen, for example, in a painting of 1936 called Composition showing two men seated at a table with a coffee pot and mugs, a woman standing with broom in hand, and a cat lying on the floor of a sparsely-furnished room. Although it has a Cubist surface quality, it could not be said to be an abstract painting. Frontier Mail and Composition contrast strongly with a painting he made before either of them: Maritime, a composition whose subjects are much more symbolically nautical than recognizably displayed.

== Later life and work ==
In the early years of his marriage, Knaths, Helen, and Agnes lived on the sisters' legacy and what little money Knaths brought in through odd jobs and the occasional sale of a painting. The winter months were cold and their house so drafty that, even though Knaths disliked city life, they spent much of that season in New York. In 1924 Helen and Agnes bought land on which Knaths constructed a house and studio using materials from nearby derelict buildings. He recognized that he needed to establish connections with dealers and exhibitors if he wished to find buyers for his art and, together with Agnes, he used his time in New York as well as trips to Boston and Washington, D.C. to do just that. In 1921 he exhibited paintings at New York's Society of Independent Artists for the first of many occasions. Knaths showed two and Agnes Weinrich three paintings in this large non-juried show without prizes. In 1926 Knaths's work appeared in another show, the Société Anonyme exhibition, held in Brooklyn, and, that same year, the collector, Duncan Phillips bought his Geranium in Night Window of 1922. Of the purchase Phillips, who was not an impulsive buyer, noted: "This exceptionally promising canvas reveals a delightful sense of color relations and a developed knowledge of what happens to colors under a flickering play of light." This proved to be the first of many purchases by Phillips and the beginning of a long and mutually rewarding friendship between the two men. During the next few years Phillips would write appreciative articles about Knaths's work and, in 1929, would devote a room in his Washington, D.C. gallery to their display. On opening the room he gave Knaths his first one-person show. A year later Knaths was given a second solo exhibition, this one at the gallery of Charles Daniel in New York.

That year Daniel became Knaths's first art dealer. In 1931 Knaths left Daniel for the Downtown Gallery and soon after he moved, this time to the J.B. Neumann Gallery. In 1945 he moved to the gallery of Paul Rosenberg & Co., which then continued to show and sell his work during the remainder of his life. Knaths, who liked the quiet life, did not travel extensively and never to Europe. He did not seek celebrity and, while he appreciated the income that came with recognition of his talent, he was not extravagant in his expenses or style of living. He was neither outgoing nor reclusive, enjoying company and establishing close relationships within the community where he lived, but relishing a quite daily routine. Rising early, he would paint during the morning hours and, during the afternoon would study, listen to music, do chores, and wander his beloved Cape Cod environs.

He was a gifted instructor but taught for brief periods at a time. Between 1938 and 1950 he gave lectures during the winter session of the Phillips Gallery Art School. From 1943 to 1945 he taught art courses at Bennington College. He also he lectured at Black Mountain College in 1944 at the Skowhegan School of Painting in 1948. Among his pupils was Dorothy Fratt.

Pine Timber (1952), The Phillips Collection

Throughout his career, Knaths drew inspiration from the natural environment in which he lived. The images he made of his everyday world include many still lifes and room interiors as well as outdoor paintings of local fishermen and clam diggers, wild and domesticated animals, and Cape Cod marine life. His choice of subjects was generally consistent while his treatment of them varied in degree of abstraction.

While young he was one of a relatively small number of American painters whose work was termed modernist and, as he matured, he grew to be one of the best known among them. By the early 1930s critics had begun to take note of Knaths and give his work more than a passing mention. In 1931 the critic for the New York Sun could say that his work had been known in the art world for quite a few years and was fairly widely collected. While abstract, his paintings possessed, this critic wrote, "a very individual kind of realism." "One feels in his work," he went on, "a love for the medium, rich textural quality, and a very unusual color harmony which varies with the subject." By the late 1940s appreciative notices such as this one became reasonably common. Beginning about 1944 newspaper art critics more frequently would analyze and usually praise his work rather than simply listing it as appearing in a show. For example, in that year A. Z. Kruse wrote a piece about his work in the Brooklyn Daily Eagle and in the late 1940s his work was featured in articles in Art News and the New York Times. In 1949 he was featured in an article by Elaine de Kooning, "Knaths Paints a Picture," in Art News.

Knaths's inaugural show in 1947 at the Paul Rosenberg Gallery was seen by one critic to be one of the ten best exhibitions of the year. In 1950 his painting Basket Bouquet won first prize in the Metropolitan Museum "American Painting Today" competition. This prize cemented his reputation as one of America's leading modernists and also marked the beginning of what would become a gradual falling off of interest in his work.

The "American Painting Today" competition touched off a rebellion by the new generation of New York painters. Calling themselves The Irascibles, a group of abstract expressionists wrote a protest complaining that the jury was hostile to the "advanced art" that they produced. The signatories were the most prominent members of what would come to be called the New York School, men such as Adolph Gottlieb, Robert Motherwell, Clyfford Still, Ad Reinhardt, Jackson Pollock, and Willem de Kooning. The protest of the young painters can be seen in retrospect as a turning point in Knaths's career. During the 1950s, as abstract expressionism gained favor, his work gradually lost popularity. The transition cannot have been unexpected but there was an irony in the fact that when he was a young painter Knaths too rebelled against what he saw as the biases of traditionalist juries. In time, when compared to the abstract expressionists, he began to seem conservative, a pathfinder rather than an innovator. One critic said Knaths did not then aim to break new ground but rather to "define the guiding limits within which modern painting must proceed in order to reach it."

This is not to say that he stopped working. He continued to work, to show, to sell, and to accrue honors. If he cared at all about his possible displacement by the new movement in the New York art world, he did not show it. In an interview he gave at the time he received the award he made no complaint about the protest but only suggested that the artists might have submitted their work to the jury and protested only if it were not accepted. In another interview, given two years later, he said, mildly, that too many artists "aren't willing to work for the final harmony of relationships." He believed they worked too quickly and lacked a habit of critical reflection. On their part the abstract expressionists seem not to have stereotyped Knaths's work as staid and conservative. Barnett Newman, one of the men who signed the 1950 protest letter, felt that it was like the work of Adolph Gottlieb and Mark Rothko in having an intensity of feeling and emotional impact. Of the three he wrote "These artists are doing what seems impossible, expressing feelings and thoughts with abstract forms and flat space." There remained an excellent market for Knaths's paintings during the remainder of his life and, at his death, the works left in his estate commanded relatively high prices.

Knaths died on March 9, 1971, in Cape Cod Hospital in Hyannis, Massachusetts, after a brief illness. Before entering the hospital he was still living in the house he had built in Provincetown and his widow, Helen, continued to live there the remainder of her life.

== Personal information ==
=== Family ===
Knaths's father, Otto Julius, was born on October 10, 1846, in Wettin, Germany. An orphan, he attended the Latin School in Halle and emigrated to the United States from Leipzig in 1869. He earned his living as a baker. He married a woman whose name is given as Maria Theresa Dietrich or Tressie Tredeck. Her birth date is not known. She died in 1932. She came from Wisconsin, and, at about the time they were married, she and Otto Julius moved to that state from Cincinnati, Ohio. The couple lived in Eau Claire, where, in 1891, Knaths was born. Soon after, they moved to Portage, Wisconsin, where, at about age 14, young Knaths began working for his uncle, George F. Dietrich, also a baker. Otto Julius died in 1908. Aged 17 at that time, Knaths was living with his uncle as well as apprenticed to him. Knaths had a sister, Olga, who was born December 9, 1893, in Milwaukee, Wisconsin, and who died January 18, 1981, in Madison, Wisconsin. She married a man named Frank Dunn and they had a son, Francis.

Knaths and his wife Helen had no children. Helen's birth name was Lena. She changed it to Helen after 1905 when she and Agnes returned from travels in Europe. She was born in 1876 on a farm in Des Moines County in southeast Iowa and died at age 102 in 1978 while living in Provincetown.

From the time of Knaths's marriage to Helen and their decision to live together with her sister Agnes, the three formed a bond that survived during the rest of their lives. Agnes was born in 1873 on the same farm as her sister. Agnes was gregarious while Helen was quiet and apparently frail. It was Agnes who managed the household for them while Helen stayed largely in the background. Knaths took over this role when Agnes died in 1946. When Knaths died in 1971, Helen showed a vivacious personality that she had previously kept hidden.

=== Physical appearance and personal traits ===
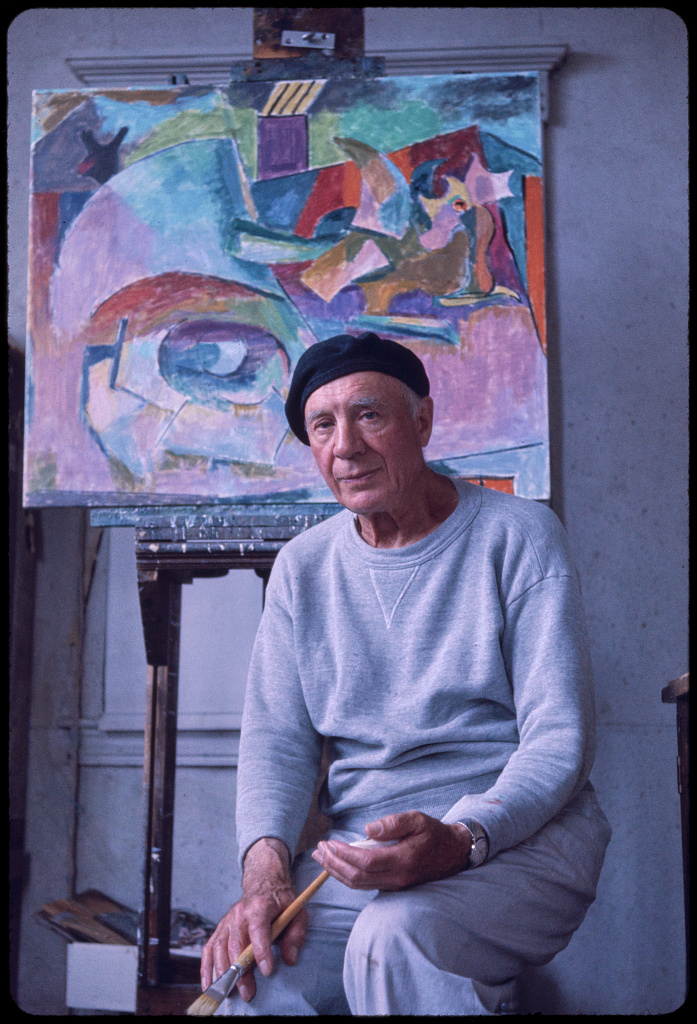
Knaths in 1968

Knaths was raised in households where German was commonly spoken and himself spoke with a slight German accent. A voracious reader, he liked to translate German writings on theories of music, colors, and painting and would ask friends to help him make the English plain.

Photos of Knaths show him to have been a large man, tall and broad. When in 1910 he went to Milwaukee to study, he was, according to one description, "an angular, open-faced boy." His World War I registration card says he had dark hair and blue eyes. People who knew him wrote that he was tall and fit, strong and gentle. Balding in middle life, he wore a beret most of the time. In an interview when he was 62 a reporter described him as "apple cheeked" and another wrote that at age 72 he was "an impressively tall, broad, sturdy man ... with a smooth ruddy face and a steady smile." He was industrious and regular in his work habits. Described as shy, sensitive, and somewhat retiring, he was also said to be modest and charming — a man whose bearing conveyed gravity and whose approach to life and art was passionate. He read philosophy and classical literature as well as writings on art, music, and color theory and he loved to listen to classical music, particularly the works his wife would play on the piano.

=== Surname ===
Knaths's surname is pronounced with a hard K. Throughout his career as a professional artist Knaths was known as Karl Knaths. His probable birth name was Otto Karl Knaths. He gave that name while attending high school and when completing his World War II draft registration. The name Otto K. Knaths appears in records for the 1930 and 1940 Census of the United States. The records of the Massachusetts census of 1905 and the U.S. census of 1910, as well as a news article of 1917 give his name as Otto Knaths. Two other names appear in official records. He gave his name as Otto George Knaths when registering for military service in the First World War. and the Massachusetts Death Index lists him as Karl O. Knaths. Since Otto by itself, Otto K., and Otto Karl appear most frequently on official records and since his father's given name was Otto, it is likely Otto Karl Knaths was his birth name. He was still part of the household of his uncle George Dietrich when he used the name Otto George, which might account for that outlying usage.

== Awards and honors ==
This is a selective list of awards and honors from sources listed in notes.

- 1928 The Norman Wait Harris Prize, The Art Institute of Chicago
- 1932 Gold Medal, Boston Tercentenary Art Exhibition
- 1946 First Prize, Carnegie Institute International Exhibition
- 1947 Paintings of the Year Award, Pepsi-Cola Company
- 1948 Competitive Exhibition of Contemporary American Art, University of Illinois, Urbana
- 1949 Featured in the "Artist Paints a Picture" series in Art News
- 1950 Third Honorable Mention, Carnegie Institute International Exhibition
- 1950 First Prize, Metropolitan Museum, "American Painting Today," Basket Bouquet
- 1951 Honorary Degree of Doctor of Fine Arts, Board of Trustees, Chicago Art Institute
- 1955 Election to membership to National Institute of Arts and Letters
- 1955 Subject of a documentary film: Karl Knaths's Cape Cod, a Motion Picture
- 1959 Election to membership to National Institute of Arts and Letters
- 1961 Brandeis University Creative Arts Award for Painting
- 1962 Andrew Carnegie prize, annual exhibition of The National Academy of Design
- 1963 National Academy of Design, Altman Prize
- 1964 Audubon Art Award
- 1965 National Academy of Design, Altman Prize
- 1968 Elected to National Academy of Design

== Exhibitions ==
This is a selective list of exhibitions and gallery shows. Knaths exhibited continuously from 1927 onward. Sources are listed in notes.

- 1922 Provincetown Art Association
- 1924 Daniel Gallery, New York
- 1925 Provincetown Art Association (exhibitor and juror)
- 1926 Phillips Memorial Gallery, Washington D.C., Eleven American Painters (the Phillips Memorial Gallery is predecessor of the Phillips Collection)
- 1927 New Chenil Galleries, London
- 1927 Provincetown Art Association Modernist exhibition
- 1927 Phillips Memorial Gallery
- 1927 Gallery of Living Art, New York University, Washington Square, New York
- 1928 Art Institute of Chicago
- 1928 Provincetown Art Association Modern Exhibition (exhibitor and jurist)
- 1929 Gallery of Living Art
- 1930 Provincetown Art Association Modernist exhibition (assists in hanging)
- 1930 Museum of Modern Art, New York, Thirty-Seven American Artists Exhibited for the First Time
- 1930 Daniel Gallery, Paintings and watercolors by Karl Knaths
- 1930 GRD Gallery, New York, Provincetown Group Show organized by Agnes Weinrich
- 1931 Art Students League, New York
- 1932 Museum of Modern Art, Murals by Forty-Nine American Painters and Photographers
- 1932 Art Institute of Chicago, 45th Annual American Exhibition
- 1932 Corcoran Gallery, Washington, D.C., Corcoran Biennial
- 1933 Museum of Fine Arts, Boston, New England Society of Contemporary Painters
- 1933 Pennsylvania Museum, Philadelphia, Flowers in Art: An Exhibition
- 1934 Eighth Street Galleries, New York, Summer Work of Contemporary Artists
- 1934 Provincetown Art Association
- 1936 Whitney Museum, New York, Whitney Biennial
- 1940 Traveling Exhibition by the Museum of Modern Art and WPA
- 1941 Whitney Museum, New York, Annual Show of Contemporary Art
- 1942 Art Institute of Chicago, Paintings by Karl Knaths
- 1943 Riverside Museum, New York, American Abstract Painters Exhibition
- 1945 Paul Rosenberg Gallery, New York, Solo Show
- 1945 Carnegie Institute, Pittsburgh, Painting in the United States, 1945
- 1946 Nierendorf Gallery, New York, Art to Aid the Hungry, an exhibition with auction of works with proceeds to go to the Friends Subcommittee on Food Parcels to Europe
- 1946 Carnegie Institute, Painting in the United States, 1946
- 1947 Paul Rosenberg Gallery, Recent Paintings by Karl Knaths
- 1948 Paine's Gallery, Boston, Boston Society of Independent Artists
- 1951 Columbus Gallery of Fine Arts, Columbus, Ohio, Recent Paintings
- 1952 Phillips Memorial Gallery, Washington, D.C., One-person Show
- 1959 Whitney Museum of Art, Retrospective exhibition, Four American Expressionists
- 1962 Rosenberg Gallery, Retrospective Show
- 1965 Phillips Collection, Retrospective
- 1971 Phillips Collection, Memorial exhibition
- 1972 Rosenberg Gallery, Memorial retrospective
- 1973 - 1974 "Karl Knaths, Five Decades of Painting," memorial retrospective, International Exhibitions Foundation. Exhibition traveled to five museums.
- 1981 Museum of Modern Art, An American Choice: The Muriel Kallis Steinberg Newman Collection
- 1982 Phillips Collection, Appreciations: Karl Knaths
- 1982 Everson Museum of Art, Woodstock, NY, Karl Knaths, 1891-1871: works on paper 1919-1930
- 1982 Bard College, Annandale-on-Hudson, NY, Karl Knaths: Ornaments of Glory
- 1988 Provincetown Art Association and Museum
- 2005 David Findlay Jr. Fine Art, New York, American Masters & Modernists: Karl Knaths
- 2007 David Findlay Jr. Fine Art, Cross Currents: Milton Avery, Karl Knaths, Herman Maril
- 2008 Fondation Cartier pour l'art contemporain, Paris, Azur

== Collections ==
Knaths's works are held in many American museums. The holdings of the Phillips Collection, Washington, D.C., are both the most extensive and best representative. In that collection there are, in all, thirty-five oils, four watercolors, four woodcuts, three collages, and one lithograph. Other museum holdings include the following.

- Albright Knox Gallery, Buffalo, New York
- Art Institute of Chicago
- Brooklyn Museum
- Canton Museum of Art, Canton, Ohio
- Cape Cod Museum of Art, Dennis, Massachusetts
- Currier Museum of Art, Manchester, New Hampshire
- Danforth Museum of Art, Framingham, Massachusetts
- Davis Museum, Wellesley College, Wellesley, Massachusetts
- Detroit Institute of Arts
- Ford Foundation and Rockefeller Institute, New York
- Harn Museum of Art, University of Florida, Miami, Florida
- Heckscher Museum, Huntington, New York
- Indianapolis Museum of Art, Indiana
- Huntington Library, Art Collection, and Botanical Gardens, San Marino, California
- Los Angeles County Museum of Art
- Metropolitan Museum of Art, New York
- Munson-Williams-Proctor Institute, Utica, New York
- Museum of Art, University of Iowa, Iowa City, Iowa
- Museum of Fine Arts, Boston
- Museum of Modern Art, New York
- National Gallery of Art, Washington, D.C.
- Pennsylvania Academy of Fine Art, Philadelphia, Pennsylvania
- Philadelphia Museum of Art
- Provincetown Art Association and Museum
- Smithsonian American Art Museum, Washington, D.C.
- Spencer Museum of Art, Lawrence, Kansas
- Stanford University, Stanford, California
- Two Red Roses Foundation, Palm Harbor, Florida
- Wadsworth Atheneum, Hartford, Connecticut
- Walker Art Center, Minneapolis, Minnesota
- Whitney Museum of American Art, New York

== Online image galleries ==
Here are some sources of digital images of Knaths's work.

- Phillips Collection
- Museum of Fine Arts, Boston
- National Gallery of Art, Washington D.C.
- Canton Museum of Art, Ohio
- Currier Museum of Art, Manchester, New Hampshire
- Harvard University Art Museums
- Indianapolis Museum of Art, Indiana
- Smithsonian American Art Museum, Washington D.C.
- The Huntington Library, San Marino, California
- University of Iowa Museum of Art, Iowa City
- WikiArt, Visual Art Encyclopedia

== Exhibition catalogs ==
This is a selective list of exhibition catalogs found on WorldCat.

- Cross section, number one of a series of specially invited American paintings & water colors : Phillips Collection. Washington, Phillips Memorial Gallery [1942]
- Karl Knaths : Buchholz Gallery, New York, 13. April - 2. May 1942. Buchholz Gallery (New York, N.Y.); New York : Buchholz Gallery, 1942.
- Walter Kuhn [and] Karl Knaths : [exhibition] February 27-March 27, 1944. Phillips Collection.; Washington, D.C. : Phillips Memorial Gallery, 1944.
- Annual exhibition of contemporary American painting; 1947. Whitney Museum of American Art. New York : Whitney Museum of American Art
- Recent paintings by Karl Knaths : December 8, 1947 to January 3, 1948 : Rosenberg Galleries. New York : Rosenberg Galleries, 1948.
- Paintings by Lee Gatch; Karl Knaths; Ben Shahn; Santa Barbara Museum of Art. Santa Barbara : Museum of Art, [1952]
- Four American Expressionists: Doris Caesar, Chaim Gross, Karl Knaths [and] Abraham Rattner, 1959 : Whitney Museum of American Art, 1959
- Karl Knaths, George Mueller : paintings by the 1961 Creative Arts Awards Winners. Brandeis University. Goldfarb Library. Publisher: [Waltham, Mass.] : Brandeis University, [1961]
- Retrospective loan exhibition of paintings, 1942–1962, by Karl Knaths : December 4, 1962 to January 5, 1963, by E M Benson; Paul Rosenberg & Co. New York, N.Y. : P. Rosenberg, [1962?]
- Exhibition of recent paintings by Karl Knaths : October 12 to November 7, 1964. Paul Rosenberg & Co.New York : Paul Rosenberg & Co., [1964]
- Exhibition of recent paintings by Karl Knaths : February 3 to February 29, 1964. Paul Rosenberg & Co. New York : Paul Rosenberg & Co., 1967
- Exhibition of recent paintings by Karl Knaths : November 1 to December 4, 1965. Paul Rosenberg & Co. New York : Paul Rosenberg & Co., [1965]
- Retrospective exhibition of paintings by Karl Knaths, April 3 - May 13, 1965, The Phillips Collection. Washington, D.C., 1965.
- Exhibition of recent paintings by Karl Knaths : October 16 to November 11, 1967. Paul Rosenberg & Co. New York : Paul Rosenberg & Co., 1967.
- Exhibition of recent paintings by Karl Knaths : January 16 to February 11, 1967. Paul Rosenberg & Co. New York, N.Y. : Paul Rosenberg & Co., [1967]
- Exhibition of recent paintings by Karl Knaths. New York, P. Rosenberg [1969?]
- Exhibition of paintings 1950-1960 by Karl Knaths : November 17 to December 20, 1969, Paul Rosenberg & Co. New York : Paul Rosenberg & Co., 1969.
- Ornament & glory : theme and theory in the work of Karl Knaths : [exhibition] October 9-November 12, 1982, Edith C. Blum Art Institute, Milton and Sally Avery Center for the Arts, the Bard College Center, Annandale-on-Hudson, New York. Annandale-on-Hudson, N.Y. : Bard College, 1982.
- Karl Knaths, 1891-1971 : works on paper, 1919-1930 by Jean Young; Jim Young; Everson Museum of Art. Syracuse, N.Y. : Everson Museum of Art; Woodstock, N.Y. Exhibition catalogs
- Memorial exhibition : paintings from 1922 to 1971 on loan from museums and private collections. Paul Rosenberg & Co. (New York, N.Y.) New York : Paul Rosenberg & Co., 1972.
- Karl Knaths, five decades of painting; a loan exhibition by Isabel Patterson Eaton; International Exhibitions Foundation.; William Hayes Ackland Memorial Art Center.[Washington, International Exhibitions Foundation, 1973]
- Karl Knaths, "Aspects I." Paul Rosenberg & Co. New York : Paul Rosenberg & Co., 1974
- Karl Knaths, "Aspects II." Paul Rosenberg & Co.[New York : Paul Rosenberg & Co., 1975]
- Cross currents : Milton Avery, Karl Knaths, Herman Maril : Saturday, January 6-Saturday, January 27, [2007], David Findlay Jr. Fine Art. New York, NY : David Findlay Jr. Fine Art, [2007]
