= Bror Julius Olsson Nordfeldt =

American painter (1878–1955)

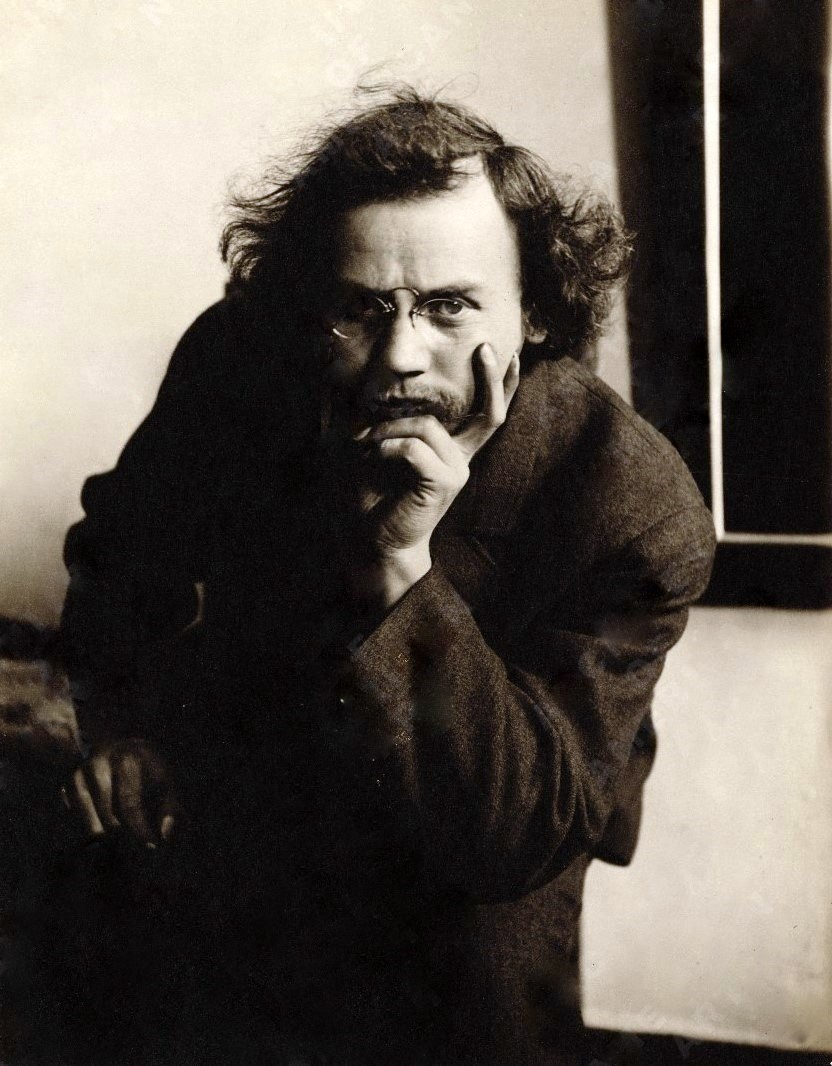
- Born: March 13, 1878; Tullstorp, Sweden
- Died: April 21, 1955 (aged 77); Henderson, Texas, United States
- Education: Art Institute of Chicago

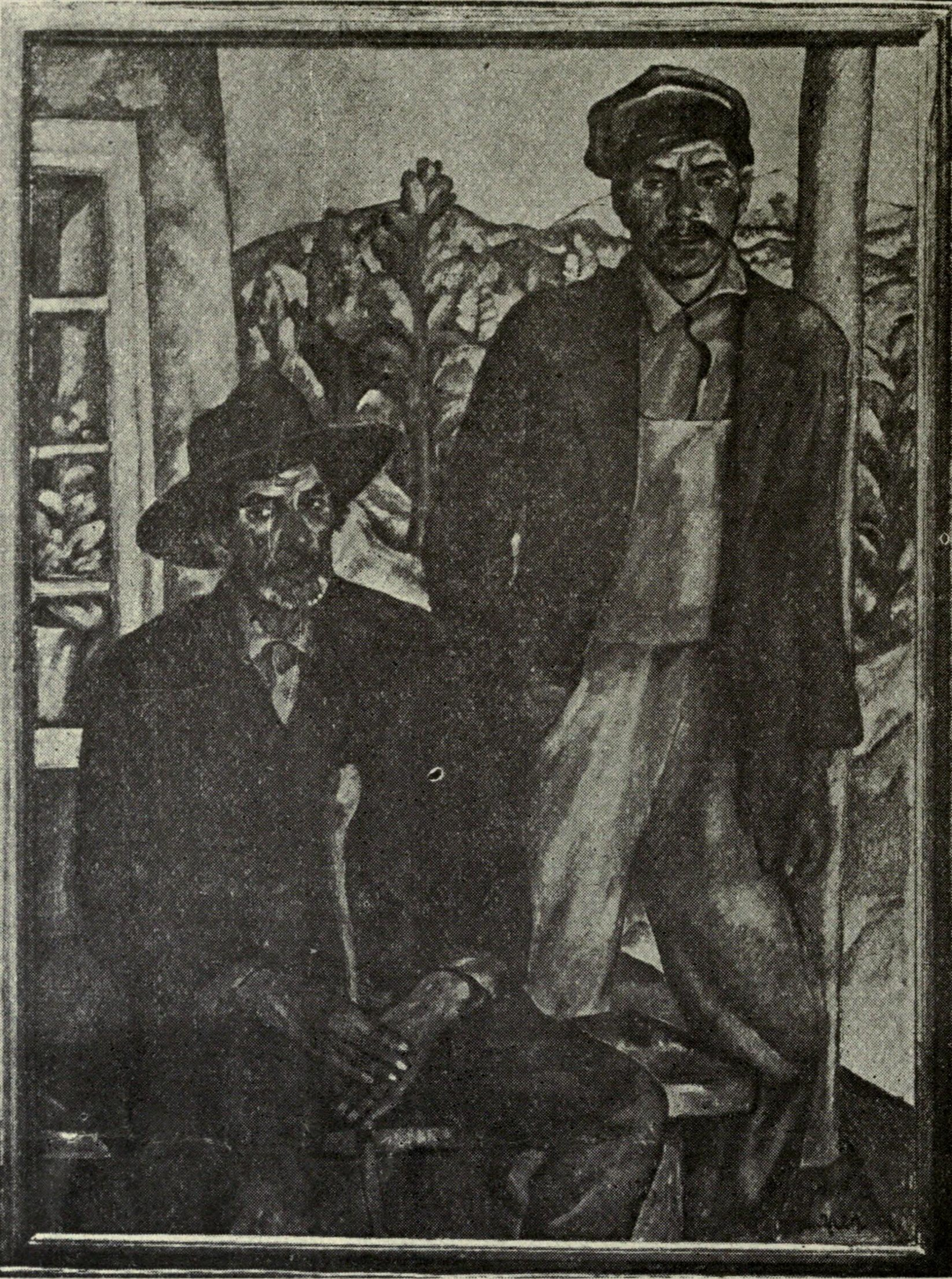
Father and Son. Black and white reproduction from 1921 exhibition catalog.

Bror Julius Olsson Nordfeldt (April 13, 1878 – April 21, 1955) was an American artist who painted seascapes and depictions of New Mexico's indigenous culture.

== Background ==
He was born in Tullstorp, Malmö, Skåne County, Sweden the son of Nils and Ingrid (Nordfeldt) Olsson. The family immigrated to the United States in 1892. He first worked as a typesetter for the Swedish language newspaper, Det Rätta Hemlandet. He attended the Art Institute of Chicago and studied with Frederick Richardson. He later apprenticed with Albert Herter in New York City, and studied in Paris at the Académie Julian. For several years he worked as an illustrator in Europe and North Africa for Harper's Magazine, where he also practiced etching. He adopted his mother's surname to avoid confusion with the maritime artist (Alfred) Julius Olsson, whose work was then becoming popular in Europe and America.

== Career ==
During World War I he was in San Francisco where he registered for the draft. During the war, Nordfeldt was assigned to San Francisco to supervise the camouflage of merchant ships. After his service in World War I, he went to Santa Fe, New Mexico upon the suggestion of William Penhallow Henderson and ended up moving there. Norfeldt was an early member of the Provincetown Printers art colony in Massachusetts. In 1921, Nordfeldt was elected an associate member of the Taos Society of Artists. He exhibited his work frequently with the Chicago Society of Etchers both before and after the war, showing between 1911-1918 and 1926–1929. In 1940 he relocated to Lambertville, New Jersey.

Throughout the 1930s, Nordfeldt taught at various schools including Utah State College, the Wichita Art Association and the Minneapolis School of Art. From 1941 to 1943, he was a guest professor for the Department of Art of the University of Texas.

Nordfeldt worked in diverse styles and media, including etchings and prints, portraiture, still lifes, and landscapes. Nordfeldt strove for a flattening of form and distortion of space, creating stylized images. He chose subjects laden with emotional power, especially nature and religious scenes.

Nordfeldt exhibited in numerous museums and galleries and received many significant awards and prizes in the course of his career. His works are held in the Art Institute of Chicago, the Hirshhorn Museum, the New York Public Library, New Mexico Museum of Art, Metropolitan Museum of Art, Newberry Library, Two Red Roses Foundation, and the Weisman Art Museum, as well as many other venues. Biographical sketches for Nordfeldt are published in most standard art reference works. His papers are held in the Manuscript Collections of the Archives of American Art.

== Personal life ==
Nordfelt was first married to Dr. Margaret Doolittle in 1910. They divorced in 1944. His second marriage was to fellow artist Emily L. Abbott in 1944 in New Jersey.

== Death ==
He died in Henderson, Texas on April 21, 1955.

== Awards ==
- 1906 Silver Medal, International Print Exhibition in Milan, Italy
- 1915 Silver Medal, Panama–Pacific International Exposition in San Francisco, California
- 1926 Bronze Medal, Sesquicentennial Exposition in Philadelphia, Pennsylvania
- 1926 Logan Medal of the Arts from the Art Institute of Chicago in Chicago, Illinois
- 1927 First Prize, Brooklyn Society of Etchers in Brooklyn, New York
- 1928 First Prize, Chicago Society of Etchers in Chicago, Illinois
- 1937 Yetter Prize for Painting from the Denver Art Museum
- 1947 Purchase Prize for Painting from the Worcester Art Museum
- 1949 Bronze Medal, from the Corcoran Gallery of Art in Washington, D.C.
