= Provincetown Art Association and Museum =

Art museum in Provincetown, Massachusetts

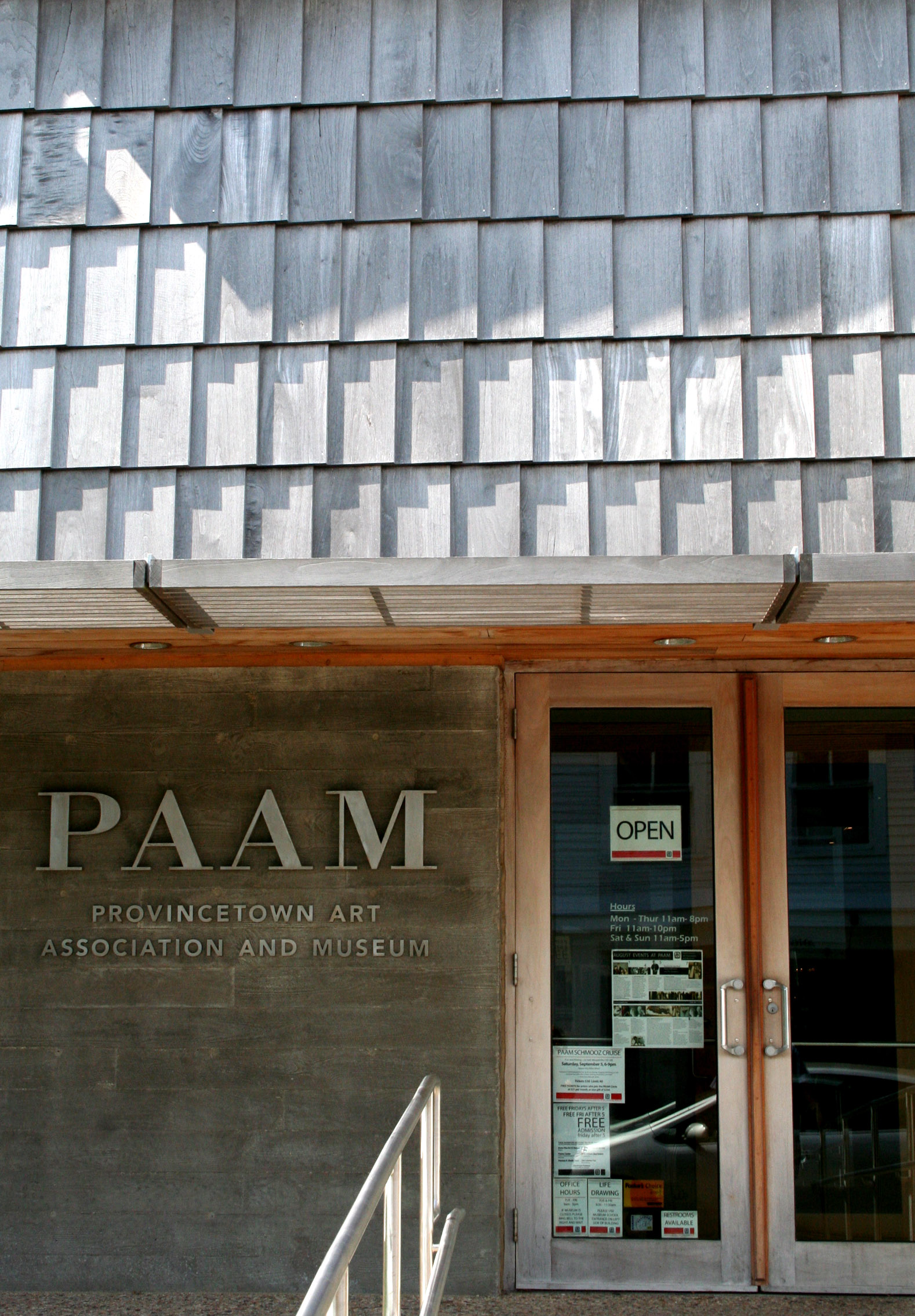
- PAAM entrance
- Former name: Provincetown Art Association
- Established: 22 August 1914 (Association)
- Location: 460 Commercial Street, Provincetown, Massachusetts
- Coordinates: 42.0564°N 70.1794°W
- Type: Art Museum
- Website: paam.org

The Provincetown Art Association and Museum (PAAM) in Provincetown, Massachusetts is accredited by the American Alliance of Museums. It was founded as the Provincetown Art Association on August 22, 1914, with the mission of collecting, preserving, exhibiting and educating people about the work of Cape Cod artists. These included Impressionists, Modernists, and Futurists as well as artists working in more traditional styles. The original building at 460 Commercial Street, is part of the Provincetown Historic District, which is listed on the National Register of Historic Places.

The organization changed its name to the Provincetown Art Association and Museum in 1970. As a professional association, it represents a membership of around 700 contemporary artists. Its growing permanent collection includes over 4,000 works. The museum mounts multiple exhibitions per year.

== History ==
=== Origins ===
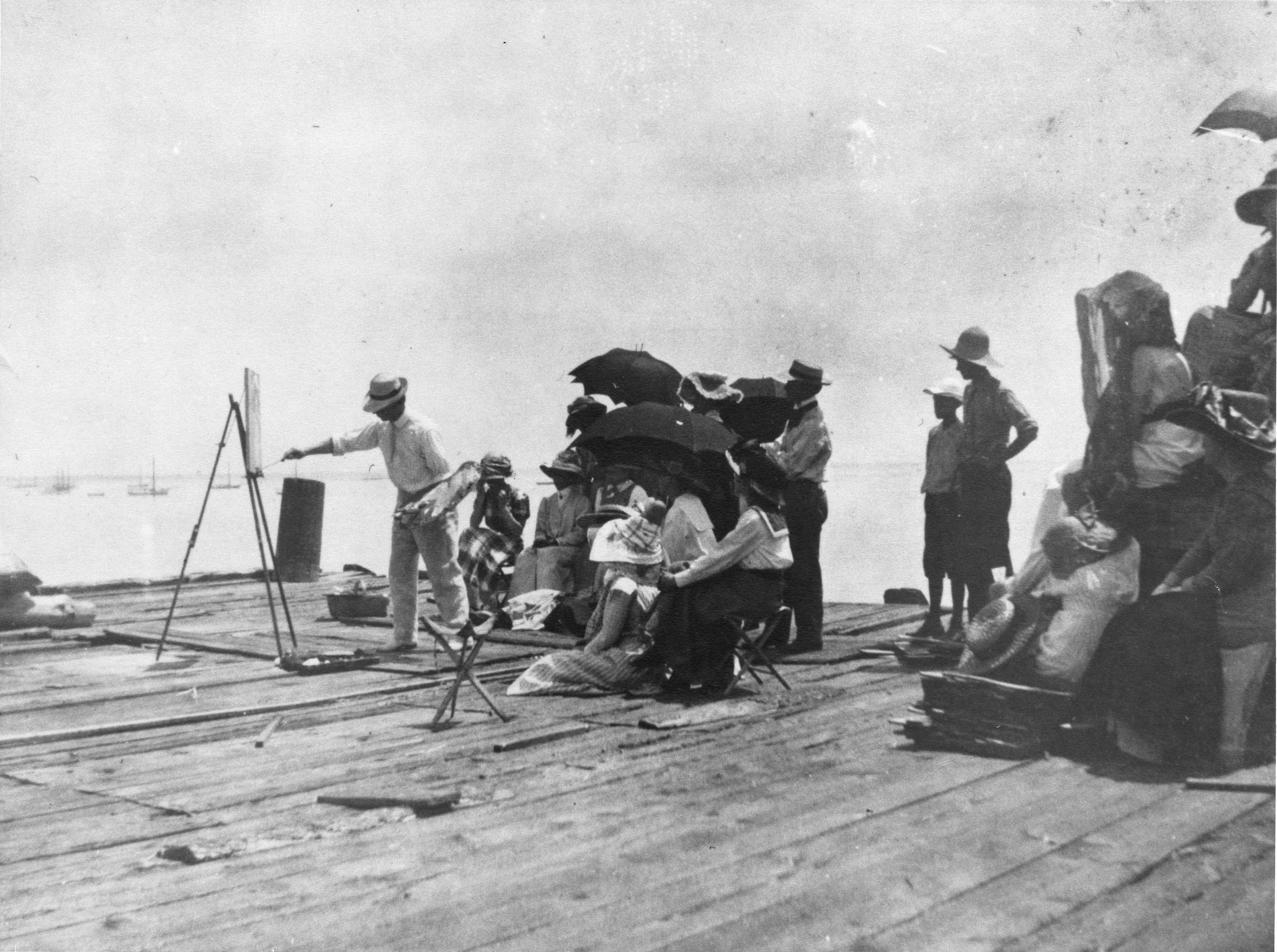
Hawthorne teaches a plein air class

The Provincetown Art Colony is the oldest of the nineteenth-century summer art colonies on the East Coast. The first formal art school there was established in 1896 by Dewing Woodward, and Laura Louise Johnson the Cape Cod School of Drawing and Painting which functioned until 1907. Perhaps better known, however, was the school founded in 1899 by Charles Hawthorne. On August 22, 1914, a group of prominent artists along with local business men and women established the Provincetown Art Association. The founding officers included President William H. Young; Vice Presidents Charles Hawthorne, William Halsall and E. Ambrose Webster; Acting Vice President Mrs. Eugene Watson (Clara Louise Smith Watson); Treasurer Mrs. William H. Young; Recording Secretary Nina S. Williams and Corresponding Secretary Moses N. Gifford. Other artists involved included Gerrit Beneker, Oliver Newberry Chaffee, Edwin Dickinson, Oscar Gieberich, Frank H. Desch, Charles Demuth, Marsden Hartley, Kenneth Stubbs. Mary Bacon Jones, Catharine Carter Critcher, Sarah Sewell Munroe and Margery Ryerson. For the first two years, the Association met monthly at members' homes or at the home of its first President, William H. Young, who was President of the local Seamen's Savings Bank. As lectures were included, the meetings moved to the Church of the Pilgrims near Town Hall.

The organizing artists mounted two juried exhibitions in the summer of 1915 at the Provincetown Town Hall. Beneker, Gieberich, Halsall, Hawthorne and Webster donated works to the nascent collection, beginning a tradition of collecting and exhibiting the work of local artists. By this time, Provincetown had become a refuge of artists and expatriates returned from war-torn Europe. In 1916, the town was hailed as "The Biggest Art Colony in the World", known for its innovative Impressionist and Futurist artists emphasizing color and light. Influential schools of the time were led by Hawthorne, George Elmer Browne and E. Ambrose Webster. A fourth Modernist school was led by Bror Julius Olsson Nordfeldt, William Zorach and Marguerite Zorach. A school of etchers, led by George Senseney, was also active. While some artists lived in the Cape year-round, others flocked to Provincetown in the summers.

The Association's first director was Harry N. Campbell. He was followed by E. Ambrose Webster (1917–1920) and then by John "Wichita Bill" Noble (1921–1923), whose son, John A. Noble also became a well-known artist.

=== Physical space ===
PAAM strengthened its role as the anchor of the art colony through the purchase of two plots of land and construction of a dedicated exhibition space. In 1919 the association purchased the former home of fishing captain Solomon Bangs at Bangs Street and Commercial Street, known as the Solomon Bangs house or "Solomon’s Temple". In 1921, the association added an adjacent property at 460 Commercial Street, once owned by Ephraim Cook and later by William Bangs. The Temple was demolished, and the building at 460 Commercial Street was renovated for use as a gallery by F.A. Days and Sons. It is listed on the National Register of Historic Places. The first exhibition to use the space was the Association's Seventh Exhibition, in 1921.

Gallery space was further expanded in later decades. Early additions included the Little Gallery in 1930 and the Hawthorne Memorial Gallery in 1942. Carl Murchison oversaw the creation of the large, open Hofmann Gallery in 1960. The Ross Moffett Gallery opened in 1978 and the Herman and Mary Robinson Museum School in the 1970s. By 1978, the organization had also built a storage vault for its expanding collection. However, by 2001, the building was significantly deteriorating.

A contemporary extension was designed by Machado and Silvetti Associates and completed in 2006. This renovation and expansion of the Provincetown Art Association and Museum has dramatically improved the museum's ability to store and display art. The first stage of the restoration, in 2004, involved the federal-style Ephraim Cook house. In 2005, the Hawthorne Annex from 1942 was replaced by the new Alvin Ross Wing, increasing the square footage of the facilities from 11,000 to 19,500 square feet (1,810 m^{2}) and effectively doubling the museum's space.

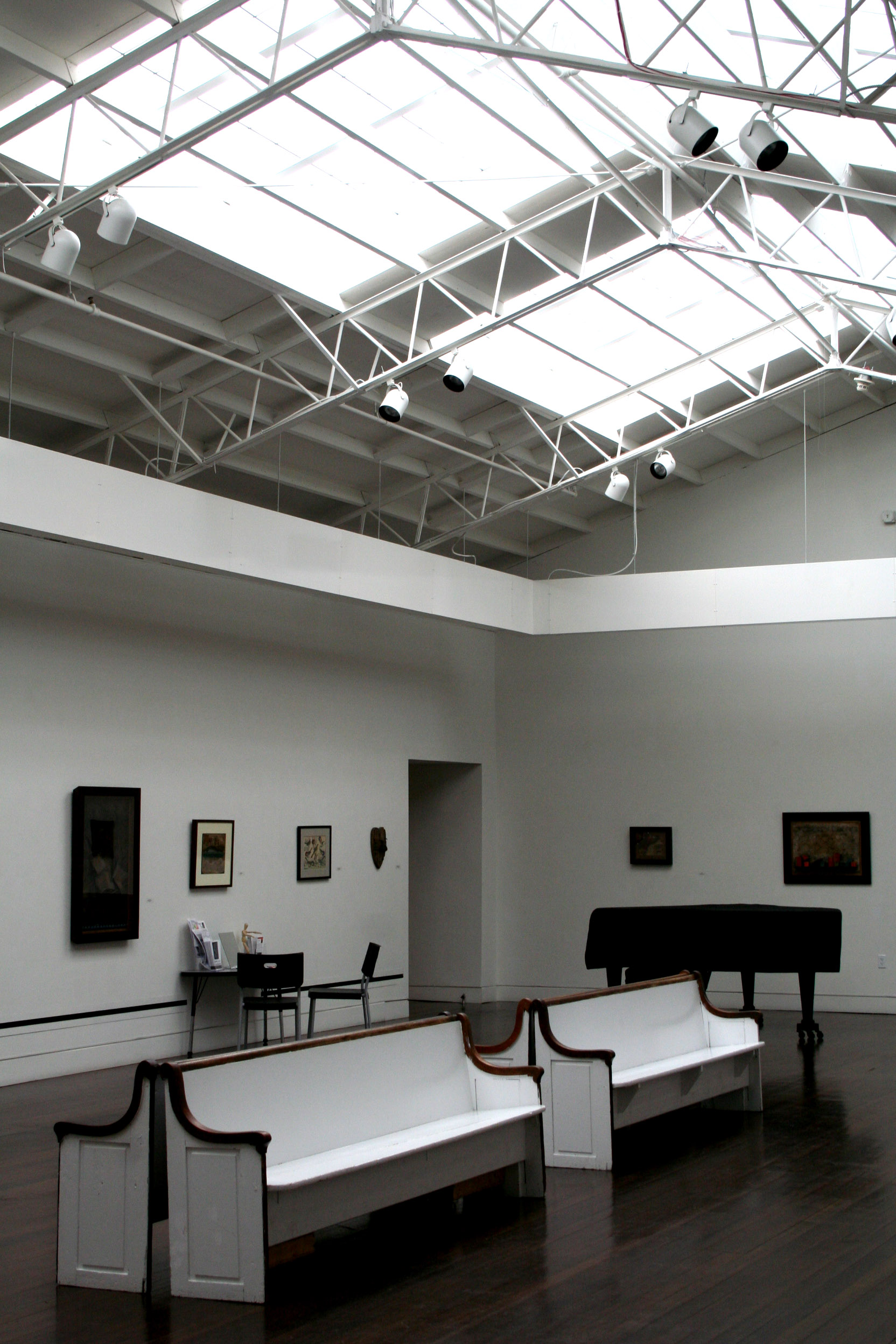
PAAM's Hans Hofmann gallery

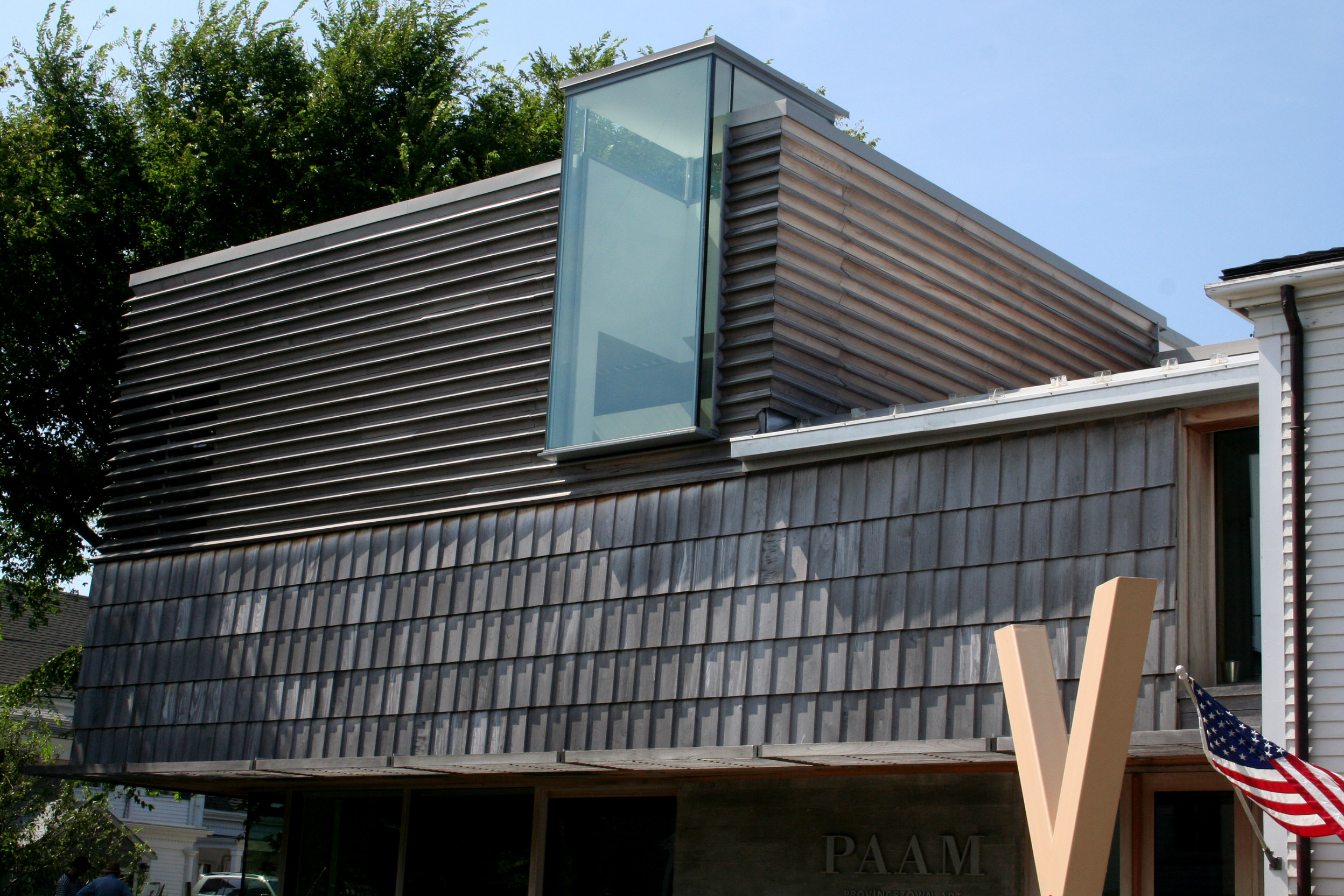
The new wing at PAAM

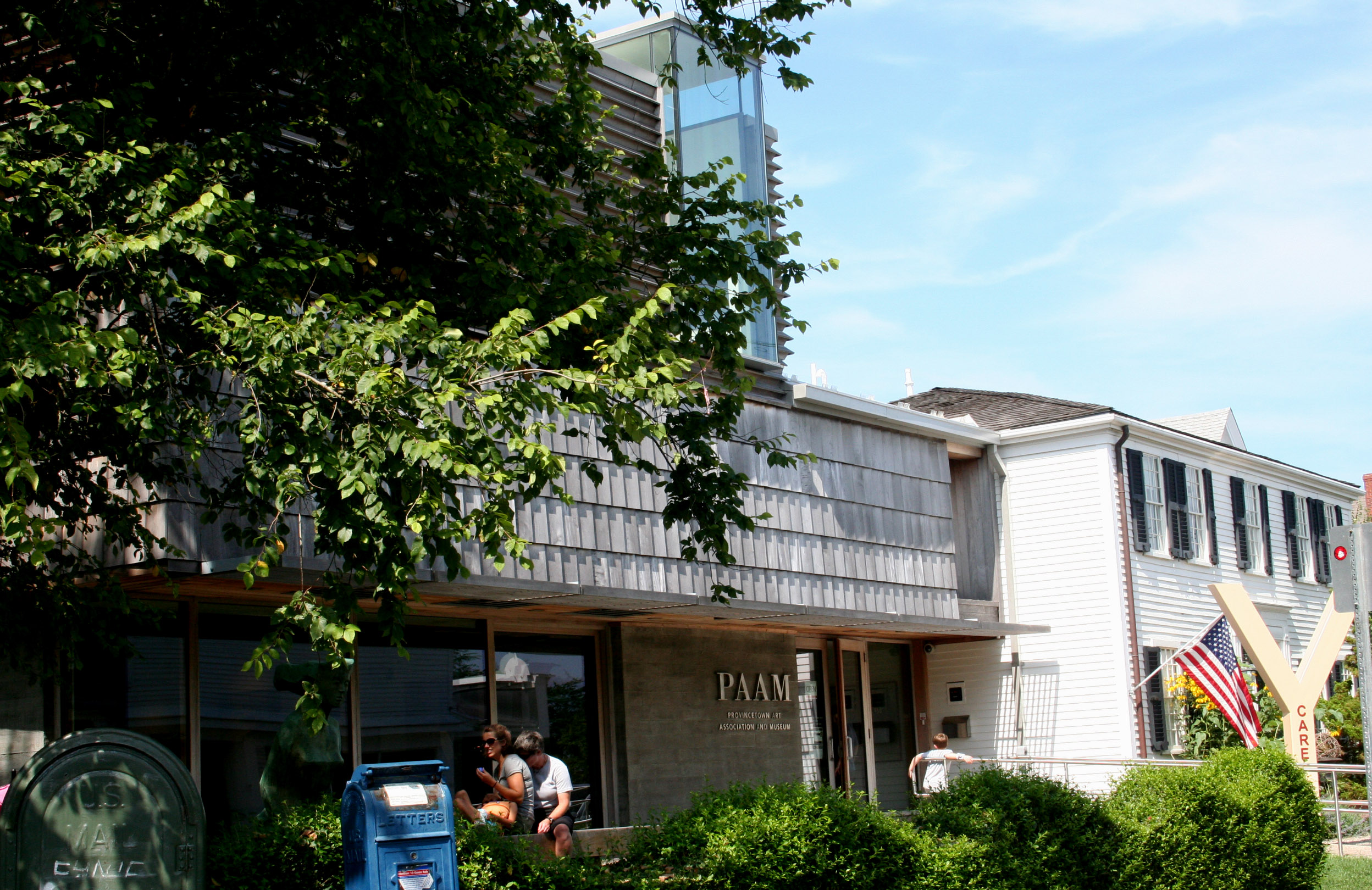
Visitors outside of the front museum entrance

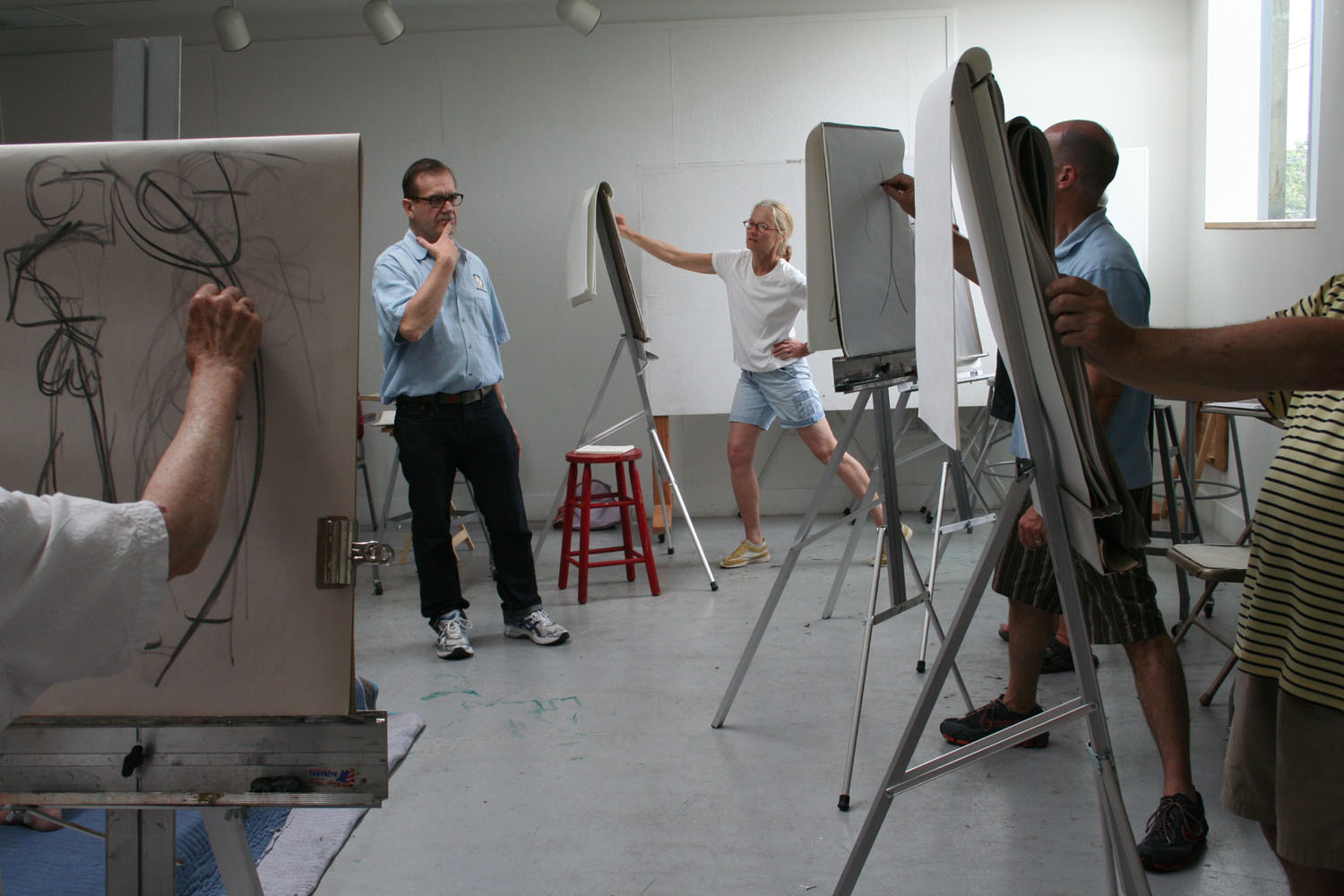
A life drawing course in session

The Provincetown Art Association and Museum now has five ground-floor galleries with rotating exhibitions on view throughout the year. Three sculpture gardens surround the building, named for James and Frances Bakker, Berta Walker, and Donald E Butterfield. The Lillian Orlowsky and Willian Freed Museum School provides classes in the drawing, painting, and print studios. The entire building is equipped with an all-season climate control system.

PAAM's physical plant has been awarded a Silver LEED rating by the United States Green Building Council to recognize PAAM's Leadership in Energy and Environmental Design. The rating quantifies PAAM's environmental performance, and assures the public that PAAM's facility is designed and operated to help save energy and natural resources.

The renovation project has also received a 2006 American Institute of Architects Merit Award for Design Excellence, and recognition within the AIA's 2007 Committee on the Environment (COTE). The building is wood-frame construction over a concrete basement. The historical portion of the Museum, which is listed on the National Register of Historic Places, is clad with white cedar shingles; the new portion of the Museum is clad with custom Spanish cedar shingles and louvers. As such, the new addition and facade expresses the tension between tradition and modernism that the Association has long exemplified.

=== Twentieth century ===
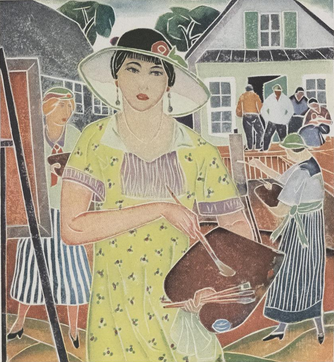
Bror Nordfeldt, "The Art Student", 1921

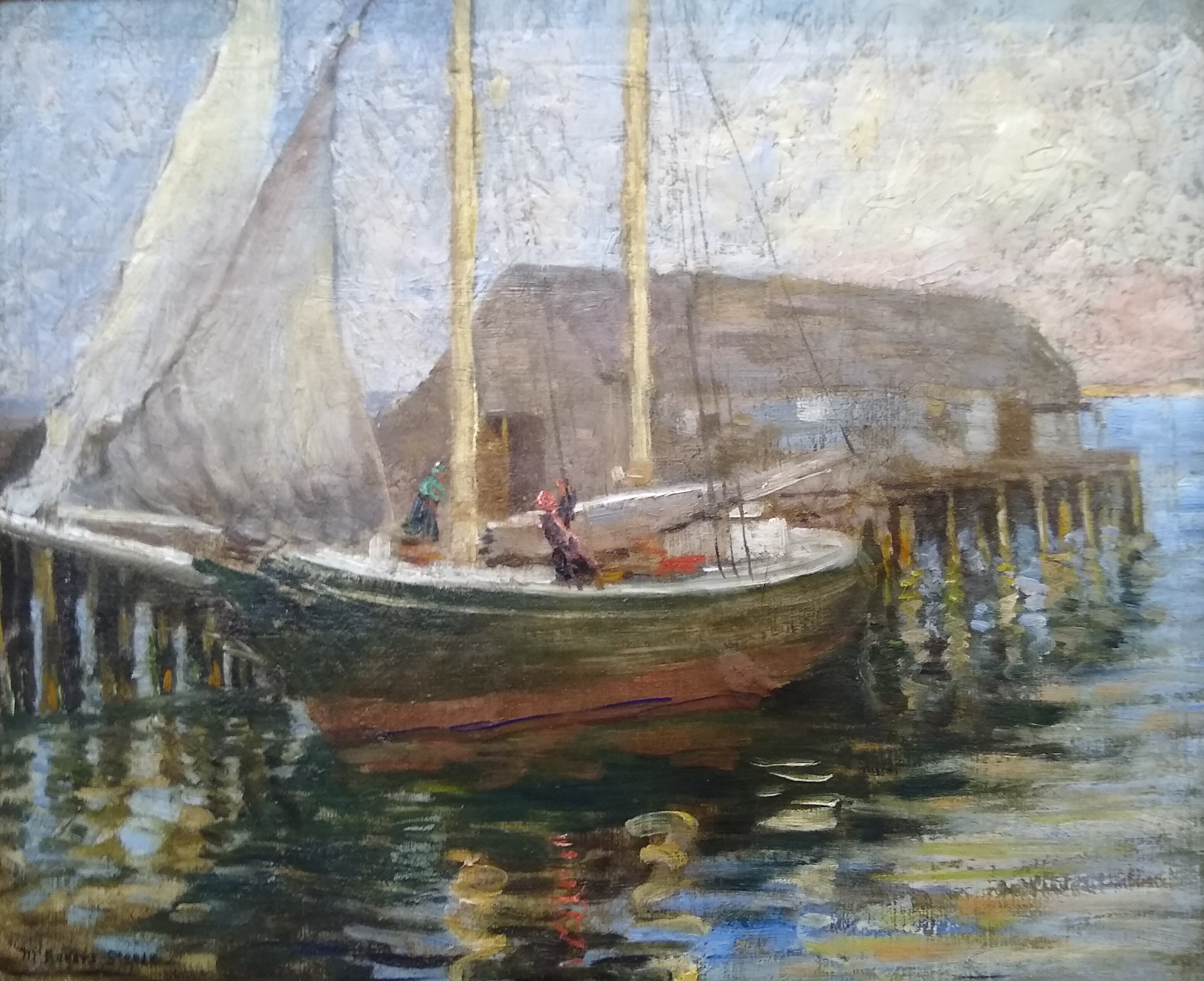
Minnie Rogers Steele, "The Sally Annie", 1923

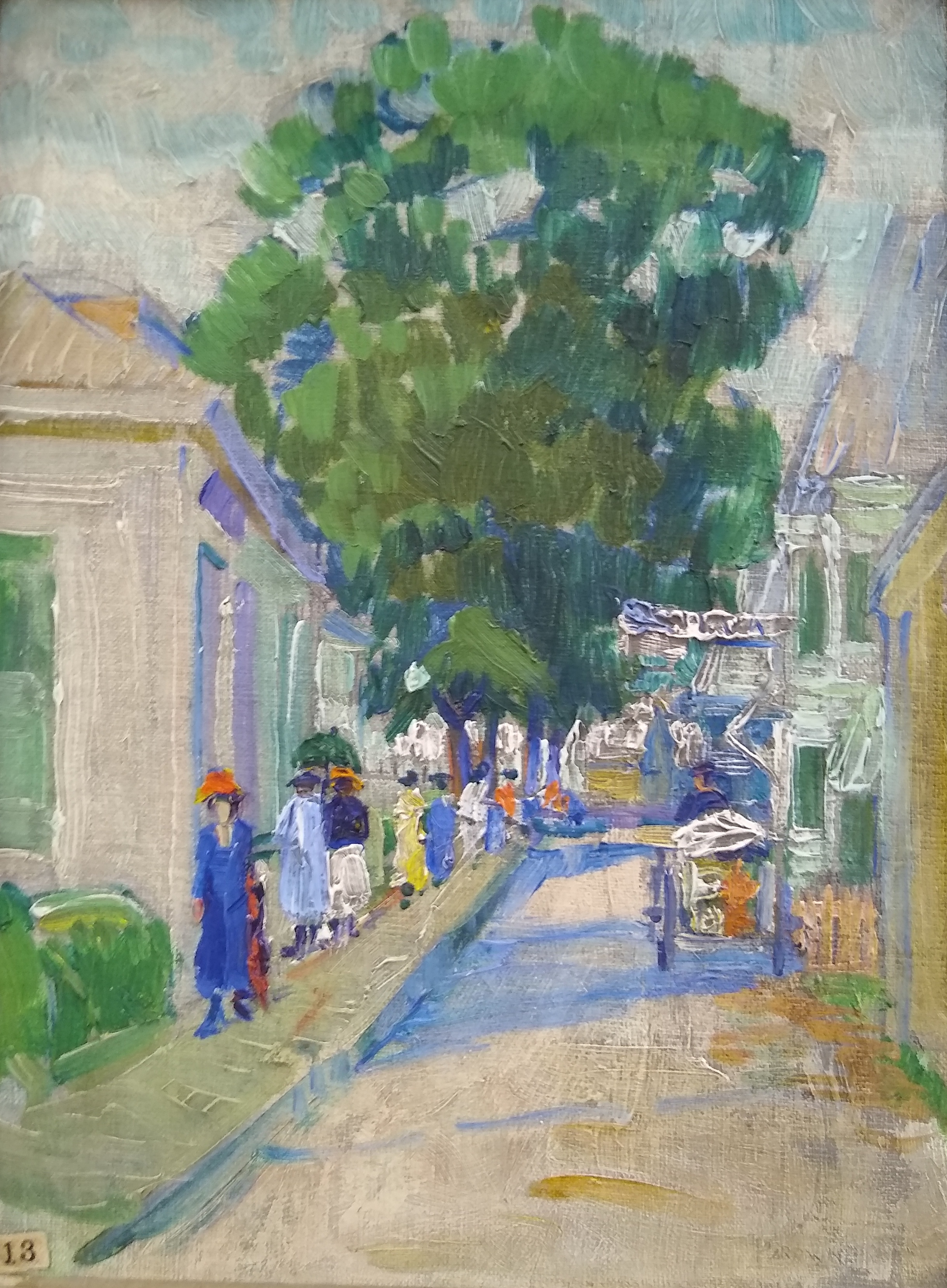
Margaretta Gratz Brown, "Commercial Street"

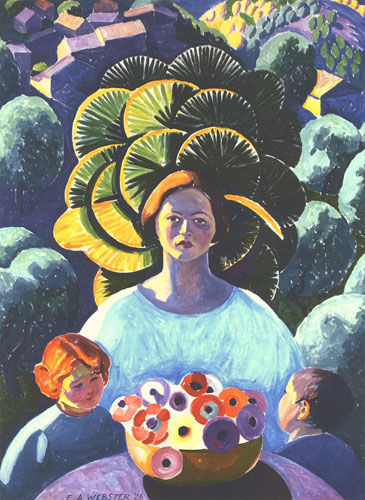
E. A. Webster (1869-1935), "Anemone, La Gaude, France," 1926

PAAM's artist founders had come out of the Impressionist tradition and thus did not readily accept the new Modernist movement. Faced with aesthetic differences among its artist membership, the organization worked to maintain a balance in the work it exhibited. Between 1927 and 1937, PAAM mounted separate "Modern" exhibitions in July and "Regular" exhibitions in August. The "First Modernistic Exhibition" of July 1927 included Modernist artists such as Jack Tworkov, Niles Spencer, George Ault and Blanche Baxter among others. Partial conciliation was reached between modernists and conservatives in August, 1936 when the Association voted to mount a combined exhibition in 1937 with concurrent exhibitions hung in the same gallery on opposite walls. By 1939, the association had returned to two shows each summer, identified simply as the "First" and "Second" exhibitions of each "Season". As well as its group shows, the association held exhibitions of individual artists such as John Cuthbert Hare.

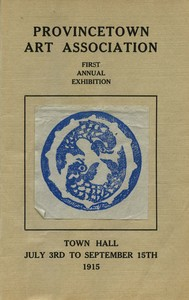
First Annual exhibition cover, 1915

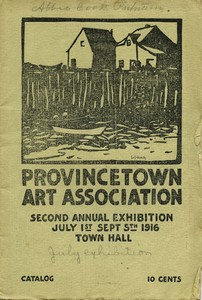
Tod Lindenmuth, Annual Exhibition cover, 1916

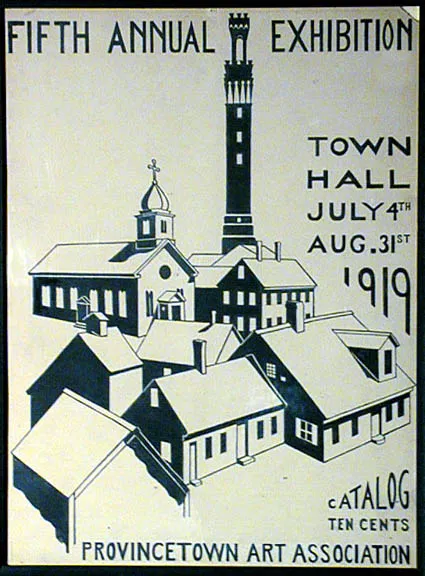
Mildred McMillen, Annual Exhibition cover, 1919

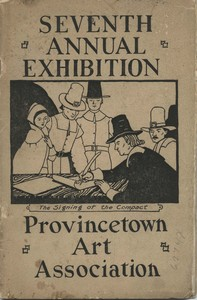
Dorothy Lake Gregory, Annual Exhibition cover, 1921

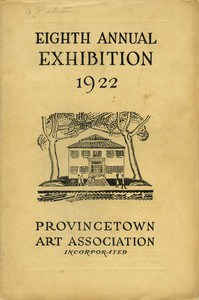
Marguerite Zorach, Annual Exhibition cover, 1922

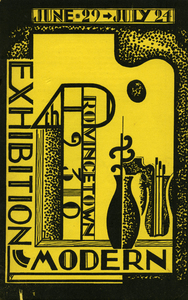
Modern Exhibition cover, 1930

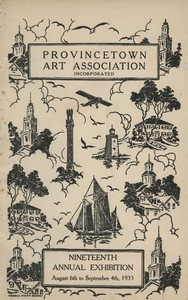
Annual Exhibition cover, 1933

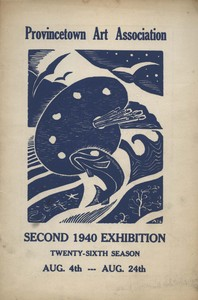
Second Exhibition cover, 1940 (Twenty-sixth Season)

The Depression years of the '30s and the war years of the early '40s were difficult times for the town and the Association. Florence Bradshaw Brown served as assistant director of the art association from 1928–1931, while her husband Harold Haven Brown was director. After his death in 1932 she served as director from 1932-1936. She was both a Provincetown artist and a supervisor for the Federal Art Project of the Works Progress Administration (WPA). Brown worked closely with Vernon Smith, the supervisor for Southeast Massachusetts. She encouraged local artists to connect with federal aid. At least two dozen local artists worked with the FAP, often on projects located outside Provincetown. They included John Worthington Gregory, Chaim Gross, Charles Anton Kaeselau, Karl Knaths, Dorothy Loeb, Philip Malicoat, Ross Moffett, Fritz Pfeiffer, George David Yater and Blanche Lazzell.

The Hawthorne Memorial Gallery was completed in 1942, and initially featured 12 paintings by Charles Webster Hawthorne, including "The Trousseau" and "The Family". Annual exhibitions were not held in 1942 and 1943 due to World War II. In the absence of a functioning board, volunteers still managed to mount one independent show in 1942 and two in 1943 despite the challenges created by wartime gasoline rationing, conscription, blackouts and economic hardships.

By 1947, the regular schedule of two summer exhibitions had been reestablished along with catalog printing, with new artists featured such as Madeleine L'Engle, Ione Gaul Walker, Howard Mitcham, Xavier Gonzalez and Adolph Gottlieb. Gottlieb was closely involved with Forum 49, a summer-long program series in 1949 organized by Weldon Kees, Fritz Bultman, and Cecil Hemley to challenge views on art. The rise of Abstract Expressionism—which had been established in Provincetown by the opening of Hans Hofmann's summer school in 1934—again ruffled the arts community during the '50s. American Figurative Expressionism is suggested to have reached its zenith in Provincetown at this time, through the works of artists including Jan Müller, Bob Thompson and Tony Vevers.

PAAM celebrated its 50th anniversary in 1964 with a retrospective show of its major artists. The show gained national attention for Provincetown's contribution to American art. The anniversary also stimulated the formation of the Fine Arts Work Center. Officially established in 1968, it began as an informal group in 1964, discussing ways to keep Provincetown accessible to artists.

Over the next three decades, the organizational structure of the museum continued to include strong representation from both the artist and lay communities. It continues in its dual purpose of being both a collecting museum and a professional artists' association. The collection has been the basis for many exhibitions and has served scholars, researchers and other museums. It includes at least 3,000 works from artists who have lived or worked on the outer Cape.

=== Twenty-first century ===
PAAM continues to acquire both historical and contemporary works. The galleries also offer accommodating venues for chamber music, jazz, dance and spoken word performances. The new studio classrooms offer spaces for children and youth education programs, as well as for adult courses in the Lillian Orlowsky William Freed Museum School at PAAM.

=== Timeline ===
Select art historical events in Provincetown over the past 100 years

Date	Event
1899	Charles Hawthorne establishes the Cape Cod School of Art
1900	E. Ambrose Webster establishes the Summer School of Painting
1914	Provincetown Art Association established on August 22, 1914
	Influx of artists and writers from New York and Paris
1915	The Provincetown Art Association has its first exhibition at the Town Hall, July 3, 1915
	The Provincetown Print Makers formed, inspired by Japanese Ukiyo-e woodcuts
1916	George Elmer Browne forms the West End School
	The Modern School of Art is formed by B.J.O. Nordfeldt, William and Marguerite Zorach, Frederick Burt, and M. Musselman Car
	Establishment of The Beachcombers, a men's club of artists and writers, and the Sail Loft Club, for women.
1921	7th Annual Exhibition opens at the Provincetown Art Association – first exhibition at its current location, 460 Commercial. Association constitution and bylaws created
1927	The First Modernist Exhibition opens as a result of a petition drawn up by Ross Moffett, Tod Lindenmuth, and thirty other artists in 1926
1934	Hans Hofmann School of Fine Art established – located on Miller Hill in the rented studio formerly occupied by Charles Hawthorne's Cape Cod School of Art
1937	The first combined exhibition of modernists and traditionalists is held at the Provincetown Art Association
1946	Hans and Miz Hofmann purchase the Waugh studio on Commercial Street at Nickerson Street; Hofmann continues teaching
1949	Kahlil Gibran, Jr., an artist, works in Provincetown
	Forum 49 exhibition opens at Gallery 200
1950s	Abstract Expressionism flourishes
1959	Galleries and Artists’ Cooperatives reach a peak on Commercial Street
1968	The Fine Arts Work Center is officially established
1970	The Provincetown Art Association changes its name to the Provincetown Art Association and Museum, recognizing its mission as a repository of artworks, objects, and archives relevant to the history of art in Provincetown
1978	The Lower Cape Arts and Humanities is formed
1979	The First Annual Fall Arts Festival is launched
1982	The Museum School at the Provincetown Art Association and Museum is established
1985	Provincetown Arts Magazine is established
1999	Provincetown celebrates its 100th anniversary as an Art Colony
2006	Renovation and expansion of the Provincetown Art Association and Museum completed by the architectural firm of Machado and Silvetti Associates

== Permanent collection ==
PAAM's permanent collection features artists who have lived and worked on the Outer Cape. Some artists represented in the collection include Mary Cecil Allen, Janice Biala, Varujan Boghosian, Florence Bradshaw Brown, George Elmer Browne, Oliver Newberry Chaffee, Carmen Cicero, Sue Coe, Charles Demuth, Martha Dewing Woodward, Edwin Dickinson, Lynne Mapp Drexler, Ethel Edwards, Dorothy Eisner, Nancy Maybin Ferguson, Perle Fine, Helen Frankenthaler, Eliza Gardiner, Jan Gelb, Dorothy Lake Gregory, Chaim Gross, Mimi Gross, Lily Harmon, Charles Webster Hawthorne, Marion Campbell Hawthorne, Henry Hensche, Hans Hofmann, Edna Boies Hopkins, Josephine Hopper, Daisy Marguerite Hughes, Lila Katzen, Franz Kline, Karl Knaths, Lee Krasner, Betty Lane, Toni LaSelle, Miriam Laufer, Blanche Lazzell, Lucy L'Engle, Dorothy Loeb, William H. Littlefield, Ethel Mars, Mildred McMillen, Ross Moffett, Jeannie Motherwell, Robert Motherwell, Seong Moy, Mary Spencer Nay, Lillian Orlowsky, Anne Packard, Jane Piper, Ellen Ravenscroft, Man Ray, Mischa Richter, John Singer Sargent, Helen Alton Sawyer, Shelby Shackelford, Selina Trieff, Jack Tworkov, Andy Warhol, Agnes Weinrich and Edith Lake Wilkinson.

== Educational programming ==
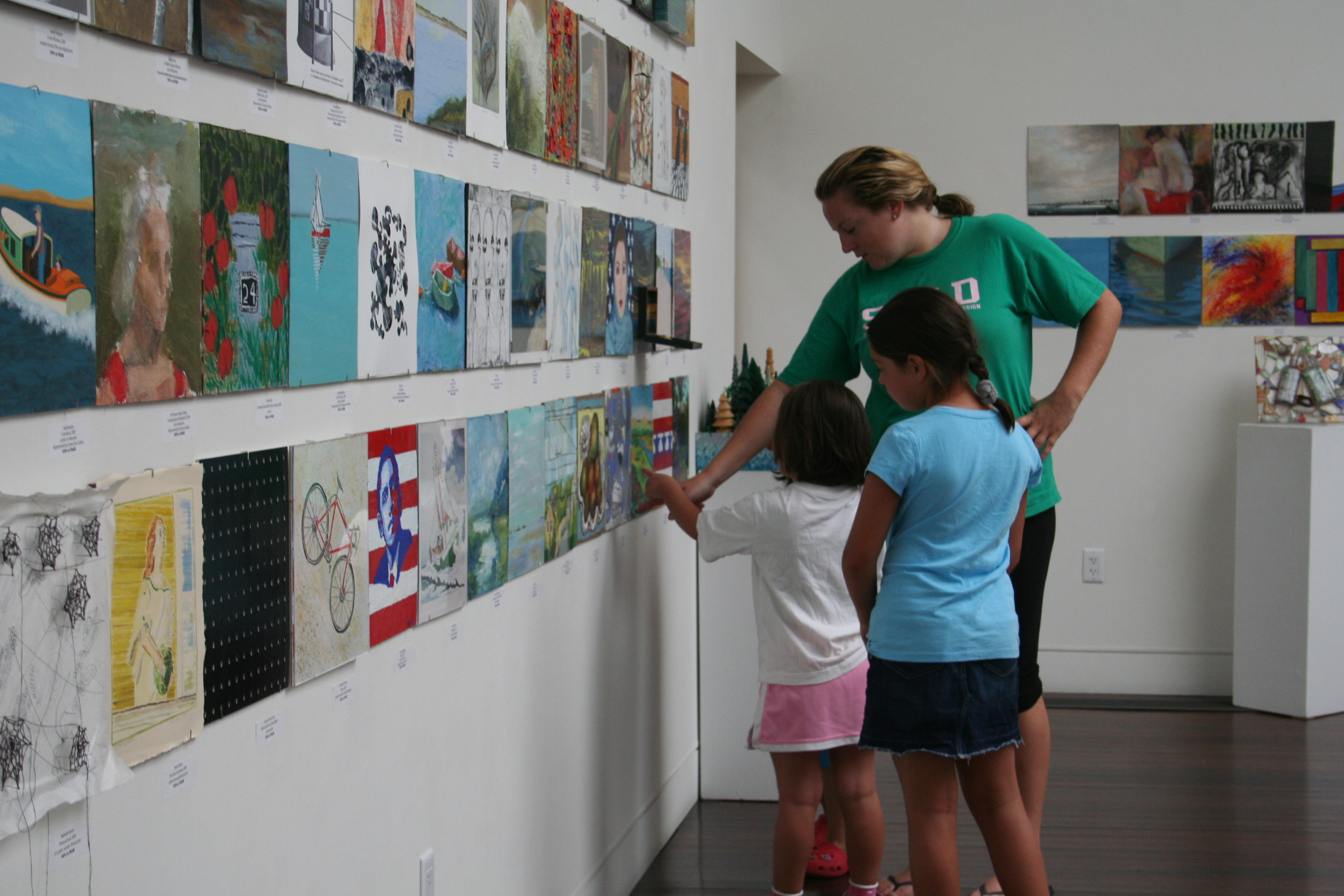
Summer 2009 intern Sarah Toscano with participants in Children's Art Adventures

The Lillian Orlowsky/William Freed Museum School offers a range of classes and programs throughout the year. Over seventy summer studio courses are offered from May through September, including courses in drawing, printmaking, mixed media, plein air painting classes with prominent local artists, and computer classes. Life drawing sessions are offered twice a week year-round, and the Museum School holds open print studio hours during the winter. Fall, winter, and spring courses include week-long master classes, multi-week workshops, and semester-long offerings. This exciting program exemplifies PAAM's commitment to year-round educational opportunities for absolute beginners, established artists, and everyone in between.

In addition to adult courses, the Museum School also coordinates classes for children and teens. Art Reach, a 28-week after-school program created in conjunction with Provincetown High School, runs from October through May. PAAM also facilitates student curating sessions and offers children's art workshops in the summer.

Studio workshops are supplemented by free educational lectures. The Fredi Schiff Levin Lecture Series runs from June through September, with additional lectures taking place periodically as well. Guest lecturers include artists, authors, and art historians who are brought in to discuss the history of the Provincetown Art Colony as well as its contemporary art scene.

== See also ==
- Provincetown Printers, an art colony of the early 20th century
