= Provincetown Arts =

American art magazine

- Editors: Christopher Busa, Susanna Ralli
- Categories: Art magazine
- Frequency: Annual
- Circulation: 22,000
- First issue: 1985
- Company: Provincetown Arts Press, Inc.
- Country: USA
- Based in: Provincetown, MA
- Language: English
- Website: provincetownarts.org/home/
- ISSN: 1053-5012

Provincetown Arts is an annual magazine published in midsummer that focuses on artists, performers and writers who inhabit or visit Lower Cape Cod and the cultural life of the nation's oldest continuous artists' colony in Provincetown. Drawing upon a century-long tradition of art, theater and writing, Provincetown Arts publishes essays, fiction, interviews, journals, poetry, profiles, reporting, reviews and visual features. Provincetown Arts is published by Provincetown Arts Press, Inc., a 501(c)(3) non-profit organization.

== History ==
Provincetown Arts was launched in 1985. It was co-founded by artist Raymond Elman (1985-1990) and the late Christopher Busa, who remained the publisher and editorial director until his passing in 2020. He is the son of painter Peter Busa (1914–1985), who participated in the formative years of Abstract Expressionism and formed a school for painters in Provincetown.

Contributors to the magazine include emerging artists as well as established figures. Its articles mainly cover art, culture, and literature. Articles also feature topics of national interest, including profiles of prominent figures, human interest stories, interviews and book reviews.

Since 2006, the magazine has featured in each issue two cover artists, one visual artist and one writer. There was an exception to this format in 2014, when the magazine focused on the centennial celebration of the Provincetown Art Association and Museum.

== Featured writers and artists ==
- Vol. 1, 1985 Stanley Kunitz
- Vol. 2, 1986 Fritz Bultman, Douglas Huebler and Jerry Robinson
- Vol. 3, 1987, Norman Mailer
- Vol. 4, 1988, Robert Motherwell
- Vol. 5,1989, Annie Dillard
- Vol. 6, 1990, Joel Meyerowitz
- Vol. 7, 1991, Long Point Gallery
- Vol. 8, 1992, Stanley Kunitz
- Vol. 9, 1993, Fine Arts Work Center
- Vol. 10, 1994, Mark Doty
- Vol. 11, 1995, Mary Oliver
- Vol. 12, 1996, Karen Finley
- Vol. 13, 1997/98, John Waters
- Vol. 14, 1999, Norman Mailer
- Vol. 15, 2000, Eileen Myles
- Vol. 16, 2001, Alan Dugan and Judith Shahn
- Vol. 17, 2002, Sebastian Junger
- Vol. 18, 2003, Hayden Herrera
- Vol. 19, 2004, Paul Resika
- Vol. 20, 2005, Michael Cunningham
- Vol. 21, 2006, Tony Vevers and Nick Flynn
- Vol. 22, 2007, Helen Miranda Wilson and Robert Jay Lifton
- Vol. 23, 2008, Michael Mazur and Gail Mazur
- Vol. 24, 2009, Varujan Boghosian and Mary Oliver
- Vol. 25, 2010, Anne Bernays and Mira Schor
- Vol. 26, 2011, Richard Baker and Roger Skillings
- Vol. 27, 2012, Selina Trieff and Robert Pinsky
- Vol. 28, 2013, Anne Packard and Jhumpa Lahiri
- Vol. 29, 2014, Provincetown Art Association and Museum
- Vol. 30, 2015, Paul Bowen and John Yau
- Vol. 31, 2016, Tabitha Vevers and Marie Howe
- Vol. 32, 2017, Sharon Horvath and Alec Wilkinson

== Notable contributors ==
- Keith Althaus
- Charles Bernstein
- Philip Brady
- Melanie Braverman
- Paul Brodeur
- Marshall Brooks
- Susan Rand Brown
- Peter Campion
- Cyrus Cassells
- Molly Malone Cook
- William Corbett
- Jay Critchley
- Carl Dennis
- Maggie Dietz
- Raymond Elman
- Lawrence Ferlinghetti
- David Ferry
- B. H. Friedman
- Frank Gaspar
- Allen Ginsberg
- Lucy Grealy
- John Grillo
- Chaim Gross
- Hazel Hawthorne
- Seamus Heaney
- William Heyen
- Tony Hoagland
- Hans Hofmann
- Budd Hopkins
- Marie Howe
- Peter Hutchinson
- E. J. Kahn, Sr.
- David Kaplan
- Howard Karren
- April Kingsley
- Michael Klein
- Tony Kushner
- Fred Leebron
- J. Michael Lennon
- Jennifer Liese
- Townsend Ludington
- John Buffalo Mailer
- Norris Church Mailer
- Hilary Masters
- Cleopatra Mathis
- Mary Maxwell
- Gail Mazur
- Richard McCann
- Elizabeth McCracken
- David Michaelis
- Susan Mitchell
- Stanley Moss
- Lise Motherwell
- Hunter O'Hanian
- Grace Paley
- Carl Phillips
- Taylor Polites
- Victoria Redel
- Martha Rhodes
- Mischa Richter
- Liz Rosenberg
- Anne Sanow
- Christina Schlesinger
- Lloyd Schwartz
- Salvatore Scibona
- Alan Shapiro
- Jason Shinder
- Charles Simic
- John Skoyles
- Tom Sleigh
- Michael Sperber
- Myron Stout
- Mark J. Straus
- May Swenson
- Jean Valentine
- Katherine Vaz
- Tabitha Vevers
- Tony Vevers
- Arturo Vivante
- Rosanna Warren
- Joshua Weiner
- C. K. Williams
- Rebecca Wolff

== Prizes and awards ==
From 1986 to the present, Provincetown Arts has received over 100 Pushcart Nominations for Fiction, Nonfiction and Poetry. Its Nonfiction ranking in 2016 continues to improve from its 2015 ranking.

- 1988 Best American Essays
- 1989 Print Certificate of Design Excellence
- 1991 Notable Essays of 1990
- 1991 Best American Poetry
- 1992 American Literary Magazine Awards: First Place for Editorial Content & Design
- 1993 Pushcart Prize XVIII: Best of the Small Presses
- 1993 Best American Poetry
- 1993 American Literary Magazine Awards: First Place for Editorial Content
- 1994 Notable Essays of 1993
- 1994 Editor's Choice IV: Essays from the U.S. Small Press 1978–92
- 1994 American Literary Magazine Awards: First Place for Editorial Content
- 1995 Pushcart Prize XX: Best of the Small Presses
- 1996 American Literary Magazine Awards: Special Mention for Design in 1995
- 1998 Best American Movie Writing
- 2002 Distinguished Short Stories of 2001
- 2003 Pushcart Prize XXIX: Best of the Small Presses
- 2003 Best American Poetry
- 2008 Pushcart Prize XXXII: Best of the Small Presses, Special Mention
- 2009 Best American Poetry

== See also ==
- List of literary magazines
