= Dorothy Lake Gregory =

American painter

- Photo of Dorothy Lake Gregory taken about 1974
- Born: September 20, 1893; Brooklyn, New York, US
- Died: October 4, 1975 (aged 82); Provincetown, Massachusetts, US
- Known for: Painter, printmaker, illustrator

Dorothy Lake Gregory (1893–1975) was an American artist best known for her work as a printmaker and illustrator of children's books. She took art classes in public school and at the age of fourteen began making drawings for a New York newspaper. She studied art in Paris in her late teens and thereafter took classes at Pratt Institute, the Art Students League of New York, and the Cape Cod School of Art. Her career as a professional artist began with her participation in an exhibition of paintings at the Art Students League in 1918. Her first book illustrations appeared three years later. She first showed prints in an exhibition held in 1935. She continued as artist, illustrator, and printmaker for most of the rest of her life employing throughout a different style for each of the three media. In 1956, a critic contrasted the "cubistic" painting style of that time with the book illustration style for which she was better known, saying he had heard gallery-goers incredulously remark, "But she can't be the same Dorothy Lake Gregory."

== Early life and education ==
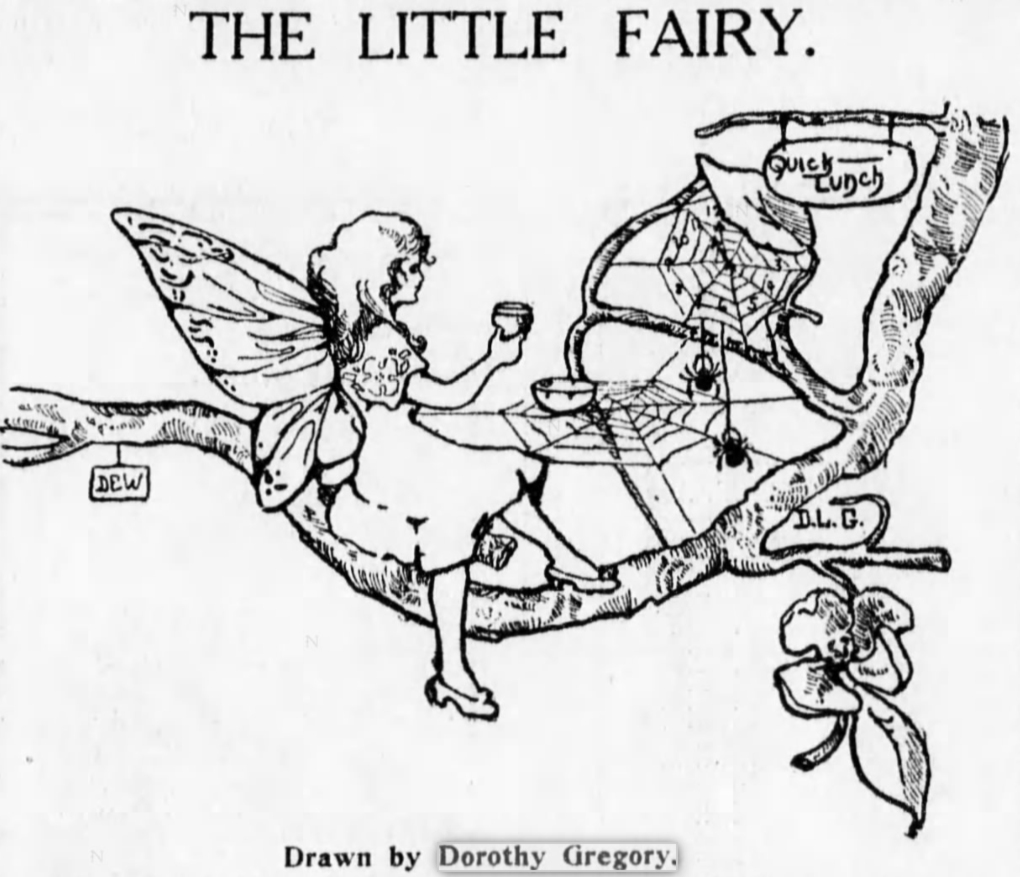
(1) Dorothy Lake Gregory, The Little Fairy, drawing for the young readers' page of the Brooklyn Daily Eagle, 1908

In 1972, Gregory recalled that while in school she was constantly making drawings. After her mother died when she was thirteen, she and her younger brother were raised by their father, Grant Gregory, who encouraged her interest in art. She also received encouragement from his sister, Helen Gregory, who had studied with Whistler. While a student at Public School 112 in Brooklyn, she made drawings for a section of the Brooklyn Daily Eagle called "For Young Readers". At the age of fourteen in 1908, Gregory made a drawing called "The Little Fairy" which shows her youthful style and contains surprising humor with its cobweb clock face with hands pointing to noon and its "Quick Lunch" sign suggesting that two spiders are going to join the pictured fairy in eating their lunch. This drawing is shown above, Image No 1.

After graduating from P.S. 112 in 1908, she continued to contribute drawings as a member of the paper's children's art club through the end of the year. She entered the Packer Collegiate Institute the following year, but left for more than a year of European travel and art study with her father and younger brother during 1910 and 1911. While in Paris, she studied at Académie Julian. Between 1911 and 1915, she attended the School of Fine and Applied Arts of Pratt Institute and in 1912 won a scholarship for the quality of her work.

On leaving Pratt, Gregory began to study at the Art Students League where her instructors included the realist painter, Robert Henri. In 1916, the League awarded her a cash prize in an exhibition of works by students in its Landscape School. She participated in another League exhibition at the conclusion of its summer session at Woodstock, New York. One of her paintings in this show drew praise from a critic in the Brooklyn Daily Eagle who wrote that she struck "a note of summer in a low-horizoned canvas, with deep-toned hills, and a single artistically-built tree, prominent in the middle distance, which merges into the green foreground." Encouraged by a fellow student to spend a summer in Provincetown, Massachusetts at the Cape Cod School of Art, she enrolled but left early, feeling disappointed with the quality of instruction and behavior of Charles Webster Hawthorne, its director. She wrote her father at the time, saying "Mr. Hawthorne is the worst teacher I have ever seen... He uses fearfully bad grammar and is a flirt, and doesn't give a rap for his students."

Gregory won second prize in a contest to design recruiting posters after the United States joined the war in Europe. That summer, despite her disappointment in 1914, she returned to Provincetown and the Hawthorne school. Alluding to this time, she later said "you learn more just from keeping at work than you do much from any teacher."

== Career in art ==
(2) Dorothy Lake Gregory, A Lady of Long Ago, etching, about 1929, 5 13/16 x 4 inches

(3) Dorothy Lake Gregory, Alice and the White Knight, about 1937, lithograph, 11 1/4 x 15 3/4 inches

(4) Dorothy Lake Gregory, The Wreck, about 1935, lithograph, 8 1/2 x 8 1/4 inches

(5) Dorothy Lake Gregory, Betty and Araminta, about 1938, lithograph

Gregory married fellow student, Ross Moffett, in 1920 and the couple made their home in Provincetown. That year, she had her first piece accepted by the jury of the Provincetown Art Association for one of its annual summer exhibitions. The jurors were Max Bohm, Charles Webster Hawthorne, E. Ambrose Webster, Oliver Chaffee, George Elmer Browne, Ethel Mars, and Mrs. Henry Mottet (Jeanie Gallup Mottet). Her submission was an untitled drawing. She continued to have works accepted for almost every one of these exhibitions from the 1920s through the 1960s. In 1927, a petition from Moffett resulted in the staging of a second show each year, this one styled the exhibition of "moderns". Between 1930 and 1937, when the association stopped giving separate modern and traditional exhibitions, Gregory contributed mainly to the moderns. In the 1920s and 1930s, Gregory usually showed drawings and prints. In 1929, she showed an etching called "Bonnet and Shawl". Another etching, "A Lady of Long Ago", shown above, Image No. 2, was in the same series. She began making lithographs in 1932 when her brother, John, set up a lithographic studio in Provincetown. The studio presented demonstrations, gave instruction, and provided a print workshop for artists. A few years later, she began what would become her best-known prints, a series of lithographs taken from Alice's Adventures in Wonderland and Through the Looking Glass. In 1972, she said these prints remained popular for the rest of her career. In the Provincetown Artists Association of 1937, she exhibited "Alice and the White Knight", shown above, Image No. 3.

In 1929, Gregory was given a solo exhibition of etchings at Macy's flagship department store on Herald Square in Manhattan. In reviewing the show, a critic for the Cincinnati Enquirer called the prints "beguiling". A few years later, she showed drawings and etchings in a duo show with her brother John at the Boston Art Club. Three years later, when she showed with him again, this time at the John Warwick Galleries in Philadelphia, a critic for The Philadelphia Inquirer praised a lithograph of hers called "The Wreck" (shown above, Image No. 4). When he reviewed the Provincetown Annual of that summer, Edward Alden Jewell of The New York Times said "The Wreck" had "special merit". In 1939, the Art Institute of Chicago showed her lithograph, "Betty and Araminta" in its seventh annual international exhibition of lithography and wood engraving (shown above, Image No. 5). Gregory's granddaughter later said that this print shows her mother (Gregory's daughter, Elizabeth) holding one of the family's cats. In reviewing the show, a critic for The Philadelphia Inquirer said the print showed a "strong sense of design".

Gregory did not join with other Provincetown artists in working for the Federal Art Project of the Depression-era Works Progress Administration. She later explained that she was too busy raising two school-age children, caring for her aging father, who then lived with the family, and managing her household.

During the 1940s, 1950s, and 1960s, Gregory continued to show in Provincetown Artists Association annuals. During this period her oil paintings were quite frequently exhibited in the Association's main gallery and her prints and drawings in its smaller galleries.

In 1953, she joined with six other women to stage an exhibit in Provincetown as "Group 7". The other artists in the show were Mary Cecil Allen, Sheila Burlingame, Ada Gilmore, Mary Hackett, Blanche Lazzell, and Hope Pfeiffer.

From 1956 through 1960, she was given solo exhibitions at the Arts and Crafts Gallery in Wellfleet, Massachusetts. Regarding the one held in 1958, a reviewer said the eighteen paintings made "a show well worth seeing." In 1967, she and Moffett showed together at the Group Gallery in Provincetown.

Gregory was able to find buyers for her paintings, particularly late in her career. However, in 1972 she suggested that she had greater success with her etchings and lithographs, telling her interviewer, "I seemed to have quite a lot of luck selling the things."

=== Artistic style ===
(6) Dorothy Lake Gregory, Fisherman's Cottage, undated, hand-colored silver gelatin photographic print, 3 1/2 x 4 5/8 inches

(7) Dorothy Lake Gregory, Landscape, undated, watercolor on paper, 8 x 14 inches

(8) Dorothy Lake Gregory, Summer on Cape Cod, about 1950, oil on upson board, 10 x 12 inches

(9) Dorothy Lake Gregory, The Birds, undated, oil on canvas board, 10 x 8 inches

Gregory was known for her oil and watercolor paintings, her pen and ink drawings, her etchings, and her lithographs. She also hand colored silver gelatin photographs. An example is "Fisherman's Cottage", shown above, Image No. 6.

During her periods of summer study in Provincetown and later as a year-round resident, Gregory, like other local artists, took for her subjects the town's dunes, beaches, harbor, and village life. In 1956, she told an interviewer that her favorite painters were Picasso, Matisse, Braque and Derain. Her style ranged from fully representational to a form of abstraction that was representational rather than non-objective.

Her untitled watercolor landscape, shown above, Image No. 7, gives a sense of her early style. Her oil painting, "Summer on Cape Cod" of 1950, shown above, Image No. 8, gives a sense of her late landscape style in that medium. "The Birds", shown above, Image No. 9, gives a sense of her handling of abstraction in oil. A representative etching is "A Lady of Long Ago", shown above, Image No. 2. "The Wreck", shown above, Image No. 4, is an example of her early lithography. "Alice and the White Knight", shown above, Image No. 3, is one of her best-known lithographs. In 1956 a reviewer noted that her late-career paintings had subjects that varied "from the humorous 'Breezy Sunday' through the quiet 'Night for Dreaming' to the dramatic 'Eye of the Hurricane'".

== Career as illustrator ==
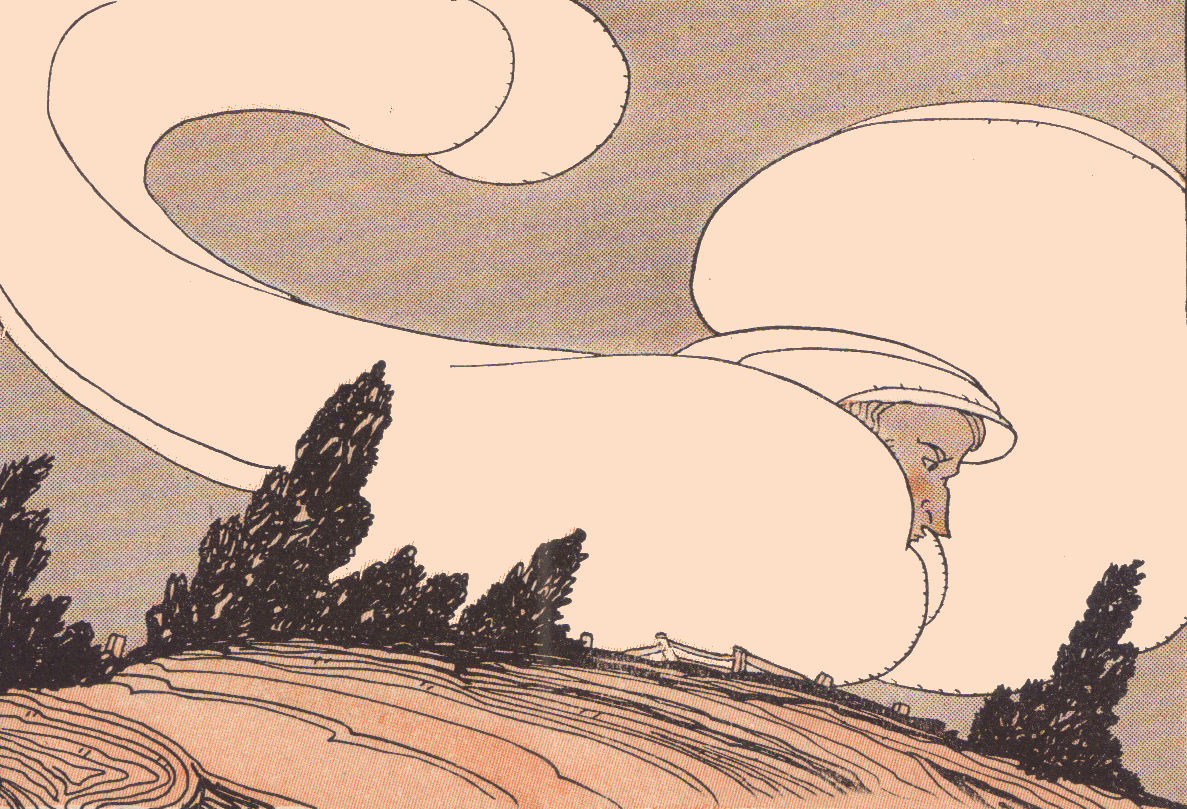
(10) Dorothy Lake Gregory, The Wind, illustration from Happy Hour Stories by Genevieve Silvester and Edith Marshall Peter (American Book Company, Cincinnati, 1921)

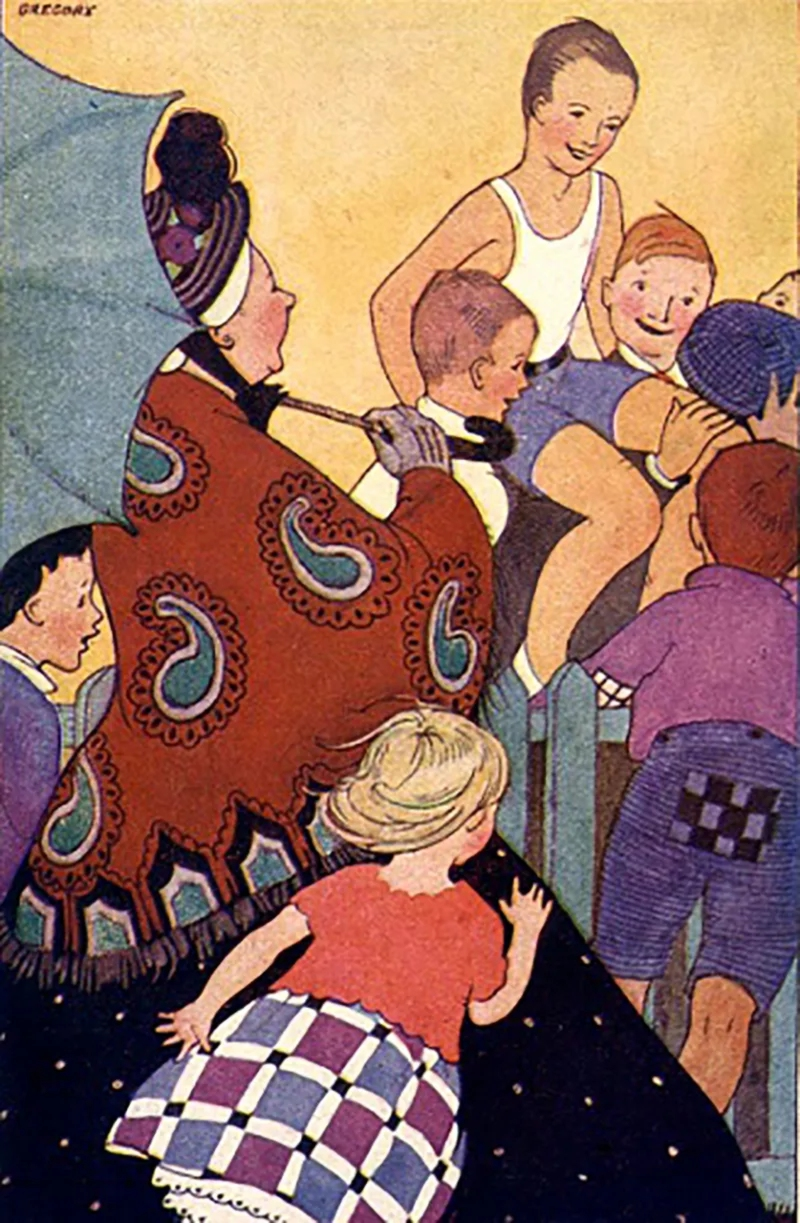
(11) Dorothy Lake Gregory, Henry lifted on many shoulders, illustration from The Box-Car Children by Gertrude Chandler Warner (Rand McNally & Company, Chicago, 1924)

(12) Dorothy Lake Gregory, I drew a pistol and fired at him, illustration from Green Fairy Book by Andrew Lang (Longmans Green and Company, New York, 1948)

(13) Dorothy Lake Gregory, Three together, illustration from All Alone with Daddy by Joan Fassler (Behavioral Publications, New York, 1969)

Gregory began her career as an illustrator in 1921 when she produced colored plates for a book of poems called Happy Hour Stories (compiled by Genevieve Silvester and Edith Marshall Peter, American Book Co., Cincinnati). Included in the collection was Robert Louis Stevenson's "The Wind", in which the poet asks, "O blower, are you young or old/Are you beast of field and tree,/Or just a stronger child than me?" Gregory's illustration of the poem shows a human figure swirling down from the sky. This illustration is shown above, Image No. 10. In 1924, she made the illustrations for the first edition of The Box-Car Children by Gertrude Chandler Warner (Rand McNally & Company, Chicago). (Note: In 1942, Chandler prepared a new edition with illustrations by L. Kate Deal, and many subsequent editions and sequels were subsequently published.) Shown above, Image No. 11 is the illustration "Henry felt himself lifted on many shoulders" from a chapter of this book called "The Race".

In 1948, Longmans, Green & Co. published new editions of books in a nineteenth-century series known as Lang's Fairy Books. The company called upon Gregory to illustrate the Green Fairy Book and the Violet Fairy Book. In Green Fairy Book, for Lang's version of The Glass Coffin by the Brothers Grimm, Gregory showed the moment when the female protagonist attempts to shoot her adversary with a pistol. The text accompanying the illustration says, "I flew into such a rage that I drew a pistol and fired at him, but the bullet rebounded from his breast and struck my horse in the forehead." This illustration is shown above, Image No. 12. Her last illustration assignment was for a publisher called Behavioral Publications in a series called "Children's Series on Psychologically Relevant Themes". The book, All Alone with Daddy (by Joan Fassler, Behavioral Publications, New York, 1969) is about a day that preschool-age Ellen spends with her father while her mother is out of town. Reviewers criticized the depiction of the mother as stereotypically focused on homemaking, cosmetics, and clothes, but approved the way the father was shown to accept household responsibilities. One of Gregory's illustrations shows the happily reunited family of three. This illustration is shown above, Image No. 13.

During her long career, Gregory illustrated dozens of children's books by a variety of publishers, including more than 20 for Rand McNally. By 1938, she was said to have won a "considerable reputation" for this work. A search of the WorldCat union catalog of libraries in the OCLC global cooperative conducted in June 2022 showed that the most widely held books illustrated by Gregory were The Green Fairy Book (372 holdings), All Alone with Daddy (361 holdings), The Box-Car Children (118 holdings), and The Violet Fairy Book (96 holdings).

In addition to the ones that have already been mentioned, she illustrated the following books: (Note: The sources for this list include, WorldCat, a union catalog or libraries in the OCLC global cooperative; the Library of Congress catalog of printed books; the Catalog of Copyright Entries, 1924 Pamphlets, Dramas, Maps Motion Pictures For the Year 1924 New Series Vol 21 Part 1 Gr 2, (Copyright Office, Library of Congress, Washington DC); the Catalog of Copyright Entries, 1924 Books For the Year 1924 New Series Vol 21 Part 1, (same); and newspaper book reviews.)

- 1922, Early Candlelight Stories, Stella C. Shetter, Rand, McNally & Co
- 1923, Jerry and Jean, "Detectors", Clara Ingram Judson, Rand, McNally & Co
- 1923, Scrap-Basket Sam and Other Stories, Elizabeth Boyle, Rand, McNally & Co
- 1923, Janey, Frances Margaret Fox, Rand, McNally & Co
- 1924, Ellen-Jane, Frances Margaret Fox, Rand, McNally & Co
- 1925, Heidi, Johanna Spyri, Rand, McNally & Co
- 1925, Jimsey, Jasmine Stone Van Dresser, Rand, McNally & Co
- 1925, Sister Sally, Frances Margaret Fox, Rand, McNally & Co
- 1926, Littlebits, Edith Janice Craine and Alberta N. Burton,, Rand, McNally & Co
- 1926, When Grandma Was a Little Girl, Stella C. Shetter, Rand, McNally & Co
- 1927, Angeline Goes Traveling, Frances Margaret Fox, Rand, McNally & Co
- 1927, Shirley Takes a Chance, Jane Trumbull, Rand, McNally & Co
- 1927, Happy Days Out West for Littlebits, Edith Janice Craine and Alberta N. Burton, Rand, McNally & Co
- 1952, Benbow and the Angels, Margaret J. Baker, Longmans, Green and Co.

In 1953, Gregory began a new phase in her career when she associated with the Hallmark company to design greeting cards.

In 1956, she told an interviewer she saw herself mainly as an illustrator and printmaker. She called her painting "a relaxing hobby", adding, "After I get through doing detailed commercial illustrations I like to paint just for the fun of it."

== Personal life and family ==
Gregory was born in Brooklyn on September 20, 1893. Her father was Grant Gregory. He had built a career as reporter and editor for The Kansas City Star and New York Herald ending as night city editor for the New York Tribune. Between 1905 and 1921, he was a speculative house builder in New York. Thereafter, he devoted himself to travel and compilation of a genealogy, The Ancestors and descendants of Henry Gregory (self-published, 1938). He was living with Gregory and Moffett when he died in 1945. Gregory's mother was Caroline Lucile Peeples. She was born in 1871 and died in February 1907. After her death, Grant Gregory continued to raise Gregory and her younger brother by himself.

The younger brother was John Worthington Gregory (1903-1992), a professional photographer and lithographer. In 1932, he established a studio in Provincetown called Craystone Lithography. In 1948, the Smithsonian Institution gave him a solo exhibition of fifty photographs in its Arts and Industries building.

Gregory met Ross Moffett the first time she attended a summer session at the Hawthorne school. He courted her after her return in during the summer of 1919. After their marriage in 1920, they departed for Europe and spent most of 1921 traveling there. On returning to the United States, they became permanent residents in Provincetown, although they often spent winter months in New York or further south. Gregory and Moffett had two children.

Gregory died on October 4, 1975, in Provincetown.
