= Brillinger =

Brillinger is a surname. Notable people with the surname include:

- David R. Brillinger (born 1937), American statistician
- Florence Brillinger (1891–1984), American abstract artist
- Jeff Brillinger (born 1947), American jazz drummer
