= Florence Brillinger =

American painter

- Born: Florence Emma Brillinger; September 2, 1891; Emigsville, Pennsylvania
- Died: December 10, 1984 (aged 93); Andover, Massachusetts
- Resting place: Prospect Hill Cemetery (York, Pennsylvania)

Florence Brillinger (1891–1984) was an American abstract artist known for her abstract cityscapes and non-objective paintings. Born and raised in a village near York, Pennsylvania, she worked mostly in York, Provincetown, Massachusetts, and Manhattan and showed most frequently in exhibitions held by the art associations of Provincetown and York and the Museum of Non-Objective Painting in New York. Largely self-trained, she studied briefly in Philadelphia.

== Early life and training ==
Brillinger was born and raised in Emigsville, Pennsylvania. She attended York High School and graduated in 1910. Soon thereafter, she took an art class in Philadelphia. (Note: Sources say she attended the "Academy of Design" which could mean the Philadelphia School of Design for Women, the Philadelphia Academy of Design, or the Pennsylvania Academy of the Fine Arts.) There is no evidence that she received any other formal art training. She joined the York Artists' Association in 1910 or 1911 and may have benefited from observing the work of the club's other members.

== Career in art ==
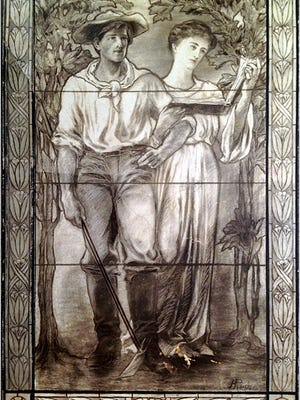
Image No. 1, Stained glass window produced by the J. Horace Rudy glass works for the Heinz headquarters building in Pittsburgh, about 1910

In 1911, Brillinger took a job as a designer for J. Horace Rudy, maker of stained glass windows in York. A painter and founding member of the York Artists' Association, Rudy was married to Brillinger's cousin, Marian Emig Rudy. At about the time she joined the firm, Rudy produced a window for the Heinz headquarters building in Pittsburgh. Shown above, Image No. 1, it gives an idea of the style of stained glass work to which Brillinger contributed. The window had Howard Emig, another of Brillinger's cousins, as its male model.

Between 1911 and 1939, Brillinger exhibited with two membership organizations, the art associations of York and Provincetown. She was one of the first women admitted to the York Art Association and showed a charcoal study in the fourth annual exhibition in 1911. Journalists noted her participation thereafter in 1915, 1931, 1932, and 1946. They mentioned her work in Provincetown exhibitions in 1926, 1936, 1938, and 1939.

In 1914, she married Fritz Pfeiffer in York. Like her, he was a graduate of York High School, member of the York Art Association, and employee of J. Horace Rudy. In 1925, the couple painted and sketched in France and in 1931 they did likewise in Spain. On their return from Paris, they moved from York to Knoxville, Tennessee, where Fritz started an art school and, in 1927, Brillinger opened a gift shop in connection with the school. By 1931, they had left Knoxville, moved to New York, and then began living year-round in Provincetown, Massachusetts, where Fritz's brother, Heinrich, ran an art school and artists' supply store.

In 1939 or 1940, Brillinger moved to New York City and her husband moved to Detroit. They later divorced and he remarried but she did not. At this time, she began to produce canvases first in a gestural pure-abstract style and then in a geometric abstract pure-abstract style. In 1939, she showed in the 3rd Annual Membership Exhibition held by the American Artists Congress. Between 1940 and 1941, she exhibited in the predecessor of Solomon R. Guggenheim Museum called the Museum of Non-Objective Painting. These shows included the Fourth Guest Exhibition of May–June 1940; Loan Exhibitions of October–November 1940, March–April 1941, and May–June 1941; Fifth Anniversary Exhibition of June–October 1942; and Loan Exhibitions of June–October 1943, and November 1951.

Brillinger spent her last years in Andover, Massachusetts, and died there in 1984.

=== Artistic style ===
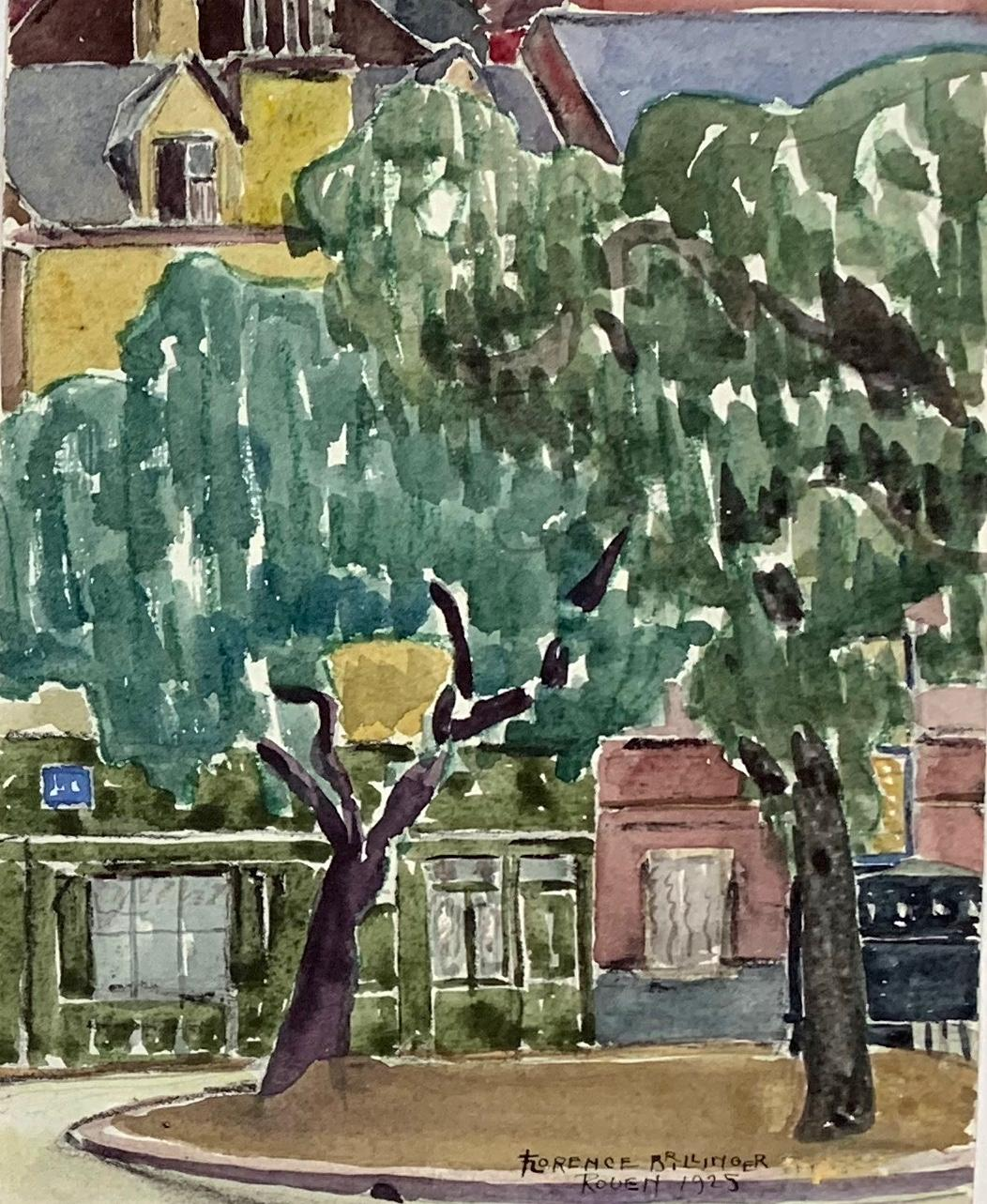
(2) Florence Brillinger, Rouen, 1925, watercolor on paper, 7 1/8 x 5 1/2 inches

(3) Florence Brillinger, Sevilla, 1932, watercolor on paper, 6 1/4 x 8 1/4 inches

(4) Florence Brillinger, Untitled Abstract, 1939, oil on paper, 9 1/4 x 6 3/4 inches

(5) Florence Brillinger, Stars, 1939, watercolor on paper, 11 x 8 1/2 inches

(6) Florence Brillinger, Untitled Abstract, 1941, oil on paper, 9 1/2 x 9 1/2 inches

(7) Florence Brillinger, Red and Blue, 1963, Oil on canvas, 36 x 29 inches

Brillinger's style can be seen in images of representative paintings from the 1920s through the 1960s. She usually painted in oil or watercolor on paper. Early in her career, she made cityscapes and landscapes. During the late 1930s, she painted in a gestural and anthropomorphic abstract style which was said to be influenced by her socialist beliefs. Beginning in 1940, she made geometric abstractions. The watercolors of street scenes in Rouen (1925) and Seville (1932), images nos. 2 and 3 above, are representative of her cityscape watercolors. Two paintings of 1939, one an untitled abstract and the other an abstract called "Stars", image nos. 4 and 5 above, are representative of her gestural abstractions of the late 1930s. The painting called "Red and Blue" of 1963, image no. 7 above, is representative of her late style of geometric abstraction.

== Personal life and family ==
Brillinger was born on September 2, 1891, in a village called Emigsville near York, Pennsylvania. Her birth name was Florence Emma Brillinger, the middle name coming from an aunt on her mother's side, Emma Arrabella Emig. Emigsville was named after the family of her grandmother, Louisa Emig Brillinger.

Brillinger's father was Horace Brillinger (1864-1963). Her mother was Margaret Catherine Gable Brillinger (1863-1950), Her father ran a general store in Emigsville until 1920 and then worked in local car dealerships. Her mother was a homemaker. Brillinger had a sister, Louise Susan Brillinger Sowle (1889-1991) with whom she attended local social events before Brillinger's marriage in 1914. She had a brother, Harry E. Brillinger (1894-1918), a chemist who died in an explosion at a plant that made TNT for use in World War I.

Brillinger's husband, Fritz (Frederick William Pfeiffer, 1889-1960) was, like her, an artist who made both semi-abstract and pure abstract paintings. His work received greater recognition than hers and, unlike her, he frequently taught art students. They had two children, a son, Ludwig Max Pfeiffer, who died before his first birthday in 1919, and another son, Sigmund Brillinger Pfeiffer (1926-2014), an electrical engineer.

Brillinger held progressive political views. She attended a socialist function in 1915 and, in the late 1930s, joined a Communist front organization, the American Artists' Congress.

When Brillinger and Pfeiffer separated, she moved to Manhattan and he to Detroit. She obtained a divorce in Reno, Nevada, in Aug 1941 and a year later he married Hope Voorhees, a former student of his. She did not remarry and continued to identify herself as Florence Brillinger Pfeiffer or Florence B. Pfeiffer.

Late in life, Brillinger moved to Andover, Massachusetts, to the home where her unmarried son, Sigmund, lived in retirement. She died there on December 12, 1984.
