= Lillian Orlowsky =

American artist

- Born: 1914; New York City, NY
- Died: 2004 (aged 89–90); Provincetown, Massachusetts
- Education: Alliance Art School, National Academy of Design, American Artist School, Hans Hofmann School of Fine Art
- Movement: American Modernist, WPA artist

Lillian Orlowsky (1914, New York City, NY — 2004, Provincetown, MA) was an American artist known as a member of the American Modernist vanguard of the 1930s. Her paintings spanned a 70-year career. Orlowsky was also a textile designer and served her community as a teacher and curator.

Orlowsky's art education began at the Alliance Art School and continued at the National Academy of Design, the American Artist School, and the Hans Hofmann School of Fine Art. She was also a WPA artist.

Orlowsky's paintings are in major public collections including the Metropolitan Museum of Art, the Provincetown Art Association and Museum, and the Chrysler Museum of Art.

Orlowsky was married to the artist William Freed from 1942 until Freed's death in 1984.
