= Eliza Gardiner =

American artist

Eliza Draper Gardiner (1871–1955) was an American artist known for her painting and printmaking. Gardiner exhibited her work in the United States and Europe.

Her work is included in the collection of the National Gallery of Art, the Provincetown Art Association and Museum, the RISD Museum and the National Gallery of Canada.
