= Dorothy Loeb =

American painter

- Dorothy Loeb, undated photo
- Born: July 3, 1887; Starnberg, Bavaria, Germany
- Died: July 23, 1971 (aged 94); Los Angeles

Dorothy Loeb (1877–1971) was an American artist known for her easel art, prints, and murals. She traveled widely in the United States, Mexico, and overseas, residing and working for the most part in Chicago, Manhattan, Eastern Massachusetts, and the State of Querétaro in Mexico. She was also a children's art teacher and proponent of progressive education. Having received training at the Art Institute of Chicago and the Art Students League of New York and having studied with artists in Munich and Paris, she adopted a variety of styles, ranging from representative to highly abstract, and worked in a variety of media including oil on canvas, oil on heavy coated paper, watercolor and ink on paper, and monotype printing. She exhibited in prominent museums including the Art Institute of Chicago, Provincetown Art Association and Museum, Worcester Art Museum, Wadsworth Atheneum, and Institute of Contemporary Art, Boston. She also showed a mural at the 1933 Chicago World's Fair. Most critics responded favorably to her work but not all. At one extreme, a reviewer called her work "the very best in the new art movement" while at the other, a critic said it was "dull, stiff, and lifeless".

== Early life and training ==
Loeb was born on July 3, 1887, in Starnberg, Bavaria, Germany. Her German-American parents returned to their home in Chicago when she was still an infant. Her father having died when she was fifteen, she lived with her mother in the Chicago home of a prosperous older brother until she was in her mid-twenties. Between 1907 and 1910, she took classes at the School of the Art Institute of Chicago. During her first year, she was photographed for an article in the Chicago Tribune wearing an extravagant gown and beating an oversize bass drum in a "Mardi Gras" fundraiser for the school. In 1909, the school awarded her a $500 travelling scholarship for which Chicago women artists were eligible and in her final year she won a prize for composition. Three years later, she traveled to Munich to study with the portraitist, Heinrich Knirr, and from there went to Paris where she studied with the Cubist painter, Louis Marcoussis and the Post-Impressionist, Henri Martin. Some time after her return to Chicago in 1913, she moved to Manhattan where she lived in Greenwich Village and worked with the Tonalist painter, Birge Harrison at the Art Students League. In 1924 she again studied in Paris, this time at Académie Moderne with the well-known modernist, Fernand Léger. At this time she became friends with the American painter and printmaker, Blanche Lazzell who was also studying with Leger. Returning from Paris, she again lived in Chicago, this time living and teaching at the Hull House Settlement on the city's Near West Side. In about 1926, she began spending the warm months in the art colony at Provincetown, Massachusetts and by 1929 had become a year-round resident.

== Career in art ==
1 Dorothy Loeb, "Primitive Forge", 1909, oil on canvas, 7 x 19 feet

2 Dorothy Loeb, "My Neighbor's Barn", 1923, oil on canvas, 20 x 24 inches

3 Dorothy Loeb, "Bacchantes", 1927, monotype on paper, 14 x 17 inches

4 Dorothy Loeb, "Fantasy Flight", undated, watercolor on paper, 10 × 8 inches

5 Dorothy Loeb, "Fantasy", 1932, monoprint, 16 1/2 x 20 inches

6 Dorothy Loeb, "Telephone Poles and Stairways", 1934, watercolor, 16 1/2 x 11 1/2 inches

7 Dorothy Loeb, "Girls Reading", 1942, oil on paper, 22 x 28 inches

8 Dorothy Loeb, Untitled (Two Women Washing Clothes), 1949, oil on board, 24 x 30 inches

In 1909, while she was studying at the Art Institute of Chicago, Loeb was one of five students selected to paint murals for a new school, Lane Tech, on the city's near north side. Commissioned by the philanthropist, Kate Sturges Buckingham, the murals depicted advances in technology from earliest times. Loeb's showed a primitive forge as an object of veneration. Painted in oil on canvas and measuring nineteen by seven feet, it covered the back wall of the school auditorium. The mural was put in storage when the school moved to a new location in 1934 and was retrieved and restored for exhibition during a 100th-anniversary celebration in 2008. A reproduction of the mural can be seen above, Image no. 1. In 1910, Loeb received another mural commission, this one from a public elementary school named after furniture store owner, John M. Smyth. One of a group of murals of scenes from American history by advanced students at the Art Institute, Loeb's showed the ships commanded by Columbus landing on the American continent. In 1912, during her first trip to Europe, Loeb had paintings selected by jurors of the American Women's Art Association for the annual exhibition held at the American Girls' Club in Paris.

Loeb's paintings were included in group exhibitions at the Art Institute in 1916, 1917, 1918, and 1929. In 1945, the Art Institute gave her a duo exhibition with the Cleveland-based, Italian-American painter Antimo Beneduce. Other shows in Chicago included appearances at the School of Domestic Arts and Science (1918), a solo at the Walden-Palmolive gallery (1932), and a mural exhibited at the 1933–34 Chicago World's Fair.

During the 1920s and 1930s, Loeb showed frequently in Provincetown and by 1943 she was reported to have been the local artist most frequently shown in the Provincetown Art Association and Museum. Her exhibitions there included ones in 1923, 1926, 1933, 1936, and 1949. In 2002, she and Blanche Lazzell were given a joint posthumous retrospective entitled "Loeb and Lazzell: Women on the Edge of Modernism". In addition to her Provincetown exhibitions, Loeb showed in museums and galleries in nearby New England. In 1938, her work appeared in the Worcester Art Museum, a decade later in the Wadsworth Atheneum, and the following year in the Institute of Contemporary Art, Boston. In 1945, she contributed a painting to the annual exhibition of the Boston Society of Independent Artists. She joined the Federal Art Project in the late 1930s and in 1937 painted a mural for the public library in Falmouth, Massachusetts. Her work was included in an exhibition of Federal art by New England artists the following year.

Loeb was a peripatetic artist. On at least one occasion, the summer of 1931, she returned to Paris. She lived in various communities in New England during the 1930s, lived in Chicago during the 1940s, and spent most of her time in Mexico during the 1950s and 1960s. She was unable to support herself through the sale of art works and relied on small stipends received from two of her cousins. A grand niece of Loeb's reported that she traveled widely by tramp steamer and bus and a letter received in Provincetown from a resident of Tucson, Arizona, reported that Loeb had been seen in India on an expedition to see Buddhist carvings.

=== Artistic style ===
Loeb made paintings in oil on canvas, on casein-treated heavy paper, and on Masonite. She made monotype prints and watercolor paintings on paper. Her monotype entitled "Fantasy" of 1932, shown above, Image no. 5, is an example of her print work. The watercolor called "Telephone Poles and Stairways" of 1934 is an example of her work in this medium. It is shown above, Image no. 6. The painting called "Girls Reading" of 1942, shown above, Image no. 7, is an example of her oil-on-paper work. An untitled painting of 1949 showing two women washing clothes is an example of her oil-on-board work. It is shown above, Image no. 8.

Most critics took note of Loeb's exhibitions, her prizes, and the mural commissions she obtained but did not comment on her style. A few of them gave brief evaluations. In reviewing the 1916 exhibition of Chicago artists at the Art Institute of Chicago, a critic for the Little Review wrote that Loeb was the only artist shown who had "a real sense of rhythm in line". In reviewing the next year's show, a critic for the Chicago Tribune said Loeb's portrait work stood out "strikingly". In 1929, a writer called her paintings and monotypes "the very best in the new art movement". On two occasions, a critic for the Chicago Tribune expressed distaste for Loeb's work. In a 1932 review of Loeb's solo exhibition in the Walden-Palmolive Gallery, Eleanor Jewett said that the abstract paintings she saw were "naive, primitive conceptions" that were "dull, stiff, and lifeless". (Note: Jewett contrasted Loeb's paintings with the "masculine assurance" of another artist appearing in a local solo exhibition. Of this show, she said, "There you find freshness, beauty, vigor, and character. Raymond Jonson dazzles us with the beauty and fineness of his drawing, its masculine assurance, and its delicate sensitiveness.) When Loeb showed with Antimo Beneduce at the Art Institute, Jewett wrote that Loeb possessed "a highly personal technique which consists of painting in oil on heavy paper that has been coated with casein." Of the painting in the show, she added: "It possibly is wise to allow the visitor to pass his own judgment upon them."

A 1980 article in the Archives of American Art Journal considered the reception that conservative Bostonians gave to the works produced by Loeb and other modernist artists in the Federal Art Project. The author said, "[I]n Boston in the 1930s, artists did not have to even suggest the radicalism of Brancusi ('egg-shaped sculpture') or the Cubists ('angular figures with purple faces') to be classified as 'modern' and banned from most clubs and exhibition opportunities. Slight abstraction or unusual color, such as was found in the work of Dorothy Loeb, was scorned as crude and defiant and generally perceived to be too avant-garde for the Copley Society or the Guild of Boston Artists." An example of Loeb's semi-abstraction and use of unusual colors can be seen in her 1923 painting, "My Neighbor's Barn", shown above, Image no. 2. The 2008 exhibition of Loeb's mural for Lane Tech drew praise from another of that newspaper's critics. Comparing her work to the other murals of 1909, this person wrote that "Primitive Forge" possessed a "visionary quality absent from the others and said that the mural was a stirring and touching reminder of the older form of artistic optimism that more modern creations—and the war—swept away." This mural can be seen above, Image no. 1. Commenting on the Loeb-Lazzell duo exhibit of 2002 in Provincetown, a critic for the Cape Cod Times called Loeb's paintings looser than Lazzell's and said they were more fanciful. An example of Loeb's fanciful and freely drawn style can be seen in the undated watercolor, "Fantasy Flight", shown above, Image no. 4. In 2021, an article in the Provincetown Independent gave a relatively extensive consideration of works on long-term display in a local nursing care facility. The author described a watercolor called "Flower" as "a colorful, semi-abstracted" painting in which the observer "can see dry brushstrokes" in some areas and, in others, "watery blues, greens, reds, and yellows mingled together." Loeb's "Fantasy Landscapes" are described as having "Dreamlike shapes [that] morph into hills and rivers, plants and animals." In a 1990 article in American Art Review, James R. Bakker, a trustee of the Provincetown Art Association and local auctioneer, wrote that Loeb was early influenced by the Impressionism and later by the Cubists and to some degree and also by Henri Matisse. He also said, "Loeb's monotypes have a certain lyrical quality that almost borders on the mystical side, as seen in her Bacchantes." Loeb's monotype, "Bacchantes" can be seen above, Image no. 2.

Loeb's grand niece Kathryn Peterson reported that Loeb sometimes painted on paper because she couldn't afford canvas.

== Art teacher ==
Loeb began her teaching career in the years before the outbreak of World War I as an instructor for Hull House, the settlement on the near west side of Chicago, and in 1923 organized an exhibit of her students' work. Aiming for a natural development of artistic skills, she replaced rule-bound instruction with suggestions and encouragement. The young artists could choose their own media and subjects and employ whatever technique they wished in planning and executing their works. In 1930, she began teaching classes in an experimental education program at PS 41, a public elementary school in the Greenwich Village section of Manhattan. As at Hull House, Loeb's students were given freedom to work without direct instruction or close supervision. Discussing her methods, Loeb told an interviewer, "the youngsters developed in the regular channels of public school instruction become somewhat self-conscious and inhibited in expressing their feelings and impressions about their experiences, and of course work less freely than these children have done." A few years later, she taught at another experimental school, the Metairie Park Country Day School in Louisiana. In what seems to have been her last position, she returned to teach at Hull House for a time during World War II.

== Personal life and family ==
Loeb was born in Starnberg, Bavaria, Germany, on July 3, 1887. Her parents were Adolph Loeb (1838–1903) and Johanna Mannheimer Loeb (1846–1933). Both were German-born and had been naturalized before Loeb's birth. They were traveling in Germany at the time of Loeb's birth and returned to their home in Chicago when she was two. Adolph Loeb bought and sold real estate for a living. Loeb was the youngest of eight children. Her siblings were Esther (1870–1940), Bertha (1871–1965), Jacob (1874–1924), Lenore (1876–1943), Ludwig (1878–1944), Eva (1880–1959), and Gertrude (1882–1956).

When Adolph Loeb's health declined in about 1900, Loeb and her mother moved into the Chicago home of his daughter, Esther, and her husband, Henry N. Greenbaum, and they remained there after his death.

In 1940, Dorothy wrote two articles published in a short-lived weekly magazine called Friday. Using photojournalism and focusing largely on contemporary celebrities, the magazine was an unsuccessful attempt to establish a progressive alternative to Life. Both of her articles concerned the plight of children in war-time Europe.

Loeb died on July 23, 1971, in Los Angeles.
