= Selina Trieff =

American artist (1934 - 2015)

Selina Trieff (1934 - January 14, 2015) was an American artist who painted and exhibited for over fifty years.

== Biography ==
Trieff was born in Brooklyn, NY in 1934. She studied at the Art Students League in New York City (1951–1953) with Morris Kantor, at Brooklyn College (1953–1955) with Ad Reinhardt and Mark Rothko, and with Hans Hofmann in New York and Provincetown (1954–1956). Trieff has taught at schools such as the New York Institute of Technology, Pratt Institute, Kalamazoo Art Institute, and the New York Studio School. She was married to the painter Robert Henry. She divided her time between New York City and Wellfleet, Massachusetts, where she died on January 14, 2015.

== Artwork ==
Trieff painted archetypal figures in a flattened and heavily delineated manner, which acted at once as self-portraits and allegories for the human condition. She developed her singular style of figuration through her strong abstract roots which continued to evolve throughout her life. Although she most often painted figures and animals, Trieff considered herself an abstract artist. Among her animal paintings are Green Goat with Moon (1983), Two Figures with Goat (1997), Three Figures with Green Goat (1992) and Connected (1996).

Trieff's somewhat autobiographical gold-leaf and oil portraits of human figures, such as Three Graces (2005), read paradoxically like characters on a modern stage wherein the painted figures who are neither male nor female, functioning as the face of the soul and the viewer, as if engaged in a dialogue. Trieff used oil and gold leaf on canvas. In her paintings, Trieff conjured a cast of characters that were both visually appealing and profoundly disturbing. Trieff’s artwork was deeply autobiographical, as her paintings and drawings represented herself as well as members of her immediate family. Trieff’s characters were often androgynous, clothed in costumes from another time. The androgynous characters can be viewed as mysterious entities in the painting. Trieff transformed the characters so that her paintings seemed to refer to a nonspecific time and place. Sometimes Trieff’s sober figures were accompanied by other entities such as skeletons or animals. Often they were set on a stage, sometimes in twos and threes, holding hands, whispering to each other, as in Dancers, (1991) and Sweet (2008). Reviewers said that they provoked a powerful sense of mystery and myth, a sense of old stories being told.

The New York Times art critic John Russell called Trieff a "peculiar painter". Trieff’s artwork testified to the strength of her contemplative sensibility and the quality of her workmanship. The pensive, introspective character of Trieff’s work as well as its spirituality and its iconic format have all been attributed to the influence of the abstract painter Mark Rothko. Trieff had myriad other influences: the confrontational quality of Watteau’s Pierrot; the structure of Velazquez’s Infanta series; the isolation of the wise fools of Shakespearean clowns; the flatness of Medieval painting; and the mystery of Ingmar Bergman’s The Seventh Seal and other films. All played a role in her work from its earliest inceptions. Trieff was called "an American original" by the New York Times art critic John Russell.

== Exhibitions and public collections ==
Trieff has had solo exhibitions at the Riverside Art Museum in Riverside, California, The Hudson River Museum in Yonkers, New York, and The Brooklyn Museum in Brooklyn, New York. Trieff's work has been exhibited across the United States and in Europe, and is included in such public collections as The Brooklyn Museum, New York Public Library, and Provincetown Art Association and Museum.
