= Mildred McMillen =

American printmaker

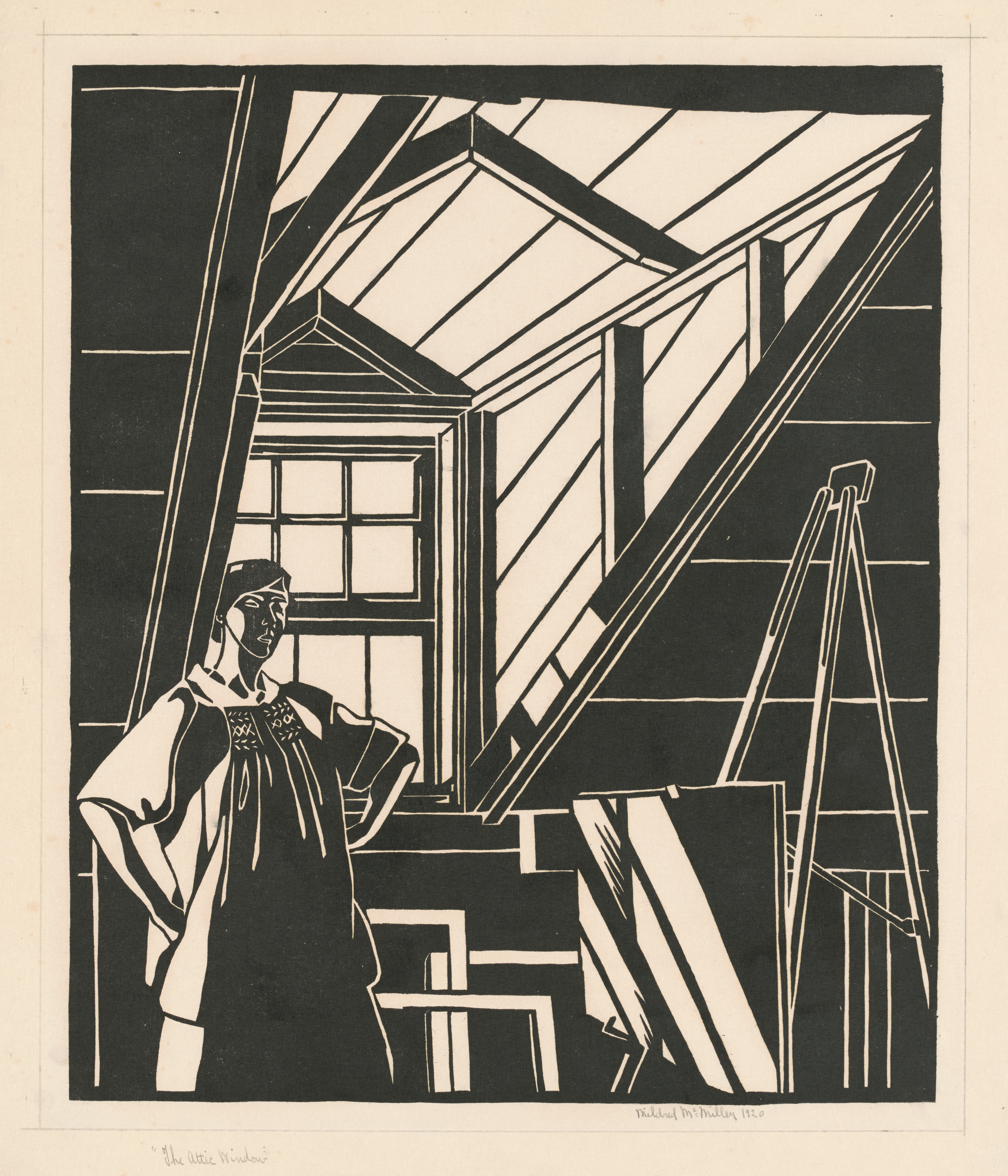
The Attic Window, woodcut (1920)

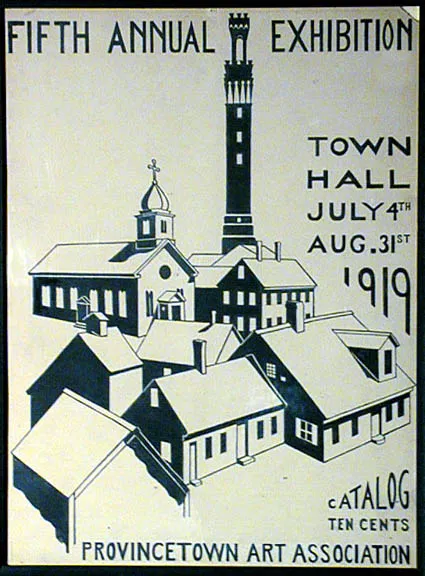
Cover art for the Provincetown Art Association Annual Exhibition catalog (1919)

Mildred McMillen (1884–1940) was an American printmaker.

McMillen was a native of Chicago who studied at the School of the Art Institute in that city from 1906 until 1913. There, she and her long-time companion Ada Gilmore first met. She and Gilmore spent time in France, studying with Ethel Mars and later at the Académie Colarossi, before the outbreak of World War I drove them back to the United States. Another teacher was Charles Hawthorne.

In 1914 McMillen and Gilmore settled in Provincetown, Massachusetts, where they became founding members of the Provincetown Printers. Notably, her prints are large in scale and black and white, unusual for members of the group. Several works by McMillen are owned by the Smithsonian American Art Museum, and she is represented as well in the collection of the National Gallery of Canada.
