= Fritz Pfeiffer =

American painter

- Fritz Pfeiffer with painting, 1940, Detroit Free Press
- Born: Frederick William Pfeiffer; June 3, 1889; Gettysburg, Pennsylvania, US
- Died: June 14, 1960 (aged 71); Provincetown, Massachusetts, US
- Resting place: Provincetown Cemetery

Fritz Pfeiffer (1889–1960) was an American abstract artist known for modernist landscapes and geometric abstractions. A prominent member of the art associations of his native York, Pennsylvania, and his long-time home in Provincetown, Massachusetts, he exhibited frequently in these and other nonprofit organizations. He also taught art classes in cities across a wide swath of the United States from Provincetown to Knoxville, Buffalo, and Detroit.

== Early life and training ==
Pfeiffer was born in Gettysburg on June 3, 1889, and raised in York, Pennsylvania. He attended high school in York and subsequently took classes from Hugh Breckenridge and others at the Pennsylvania Academy of the Fine Arts. In 1910, he studied with Robert Henri at the New York School of Art.

== Career in art ==
Pfeiffer joined the York Art Association before completing his art studies and in 1909 was appointed its treasurer. Founded a few years earlier, the association, was remarkable for admitting men and women without distinction. It held regular exhibitions and declared itself to be a "band of independent workers and students, who in the absence of a teacher, desire to cultivate individuality in their work". While living in York, he earned his living as a designer of glass panels for a local company that specialized in stained glass windows. The owner of the business, J. Horace Rudy, was himself an artist and officer of the art association.

Pfeiffer frequently contributed to the association's exhibitions and after he moved out of the city in 1915 he continued to send paintings for exhibition in York from time to time. (Note: See, for example: York Daily, March 3, 1939; New York Dispatch, September 23, 1939; York Daily, February 20, 1911; Gazette, May 6, 1915).) In 1912 he traveled in Europe. In 1914, he participated in group exhibitions at the Peabody Institute in Baltimore, the Carnegie Institute in Pittsburgh, and the Pennsylvania Academy of the Fine Arts in Philadelphia. In November of that year, he married a York artist, Florence Brillinger, who was also a member of the association and designer at the Rudy firm. The couple subsequently moved to Buffalo, New York. At about this time he showed in the Albright Art Gallery in Buffalo where his pastel, "Suburbs of Marseilles," was purchased by a member of the jury.

In 1915, Pfeiffer showed again at the Peabody and soon after showed at the Milwaukee Art Institute. In 1915, he won a prize in the Twelfth Annual Competitive Exhibit for Art Students held at Wanamaker's in Philadelphia.

Pfeiffer and Brillinger moved to Massillon, Ohio, early in the 1920s and, after a lengthy trip to Europe, relocated to Knoxville, Tennessee, in 1925. (Note: See, for example: York Dispatch, August 25, 1922; York Daily Record, November 5, 1925; Knoxville Journal, November 24, 1925; and York Dispatch, September 4, 1926.) His work continued to appear in exhibits at Wanamaker's and the Pennsylvania Academy. At this time, he also showed at the Art Institute of Chicago.

In the 1920s, Pfeiffer and Brillinger had begun spending summers in Provincetown, Massachusetts, where his brother Henry (also known as Heinrich) was firmly entrenched in the local art community. By 1931, they were living in Provincetown year-round. Pfeiffer became an officer of the Provincetown Art Association and participated in its exhibitions. During the 1930s, he also continued to show at the Philadelphia Academy and showed as well at the Boston City Men's Club, the Palace of Legion of Honor in San Francisco, and the Onya la Tour Gallery in New York. Other shows during this period included a multi-site exhibition called "Federal Art in New England", an exhibition put on by the American Artists Congress in New York, and an exhibition at the Worcester Art Museum called "Contemporary Water Color Painting".

In the mid-1930s, Pfeiffer joined the Federal Art Project. His work was supervised by another Provincetown resident, the artist Florence Brown. He participated in the inaugural exhibition of Massachusetts artists at the New Federal Art Project Gallery in Boston in 1936. He remained in the project until at least 1940, the date of a solo show held at Harvard's Germanic Museum.

In 1932, Pfeiffer and Brillinger spent the winter in Spain, and in 1935 he showed watercolor sketches made at this time in his first major solo exhibition, at the Ehrich-Newhouse Gallery in Manhattan. Reviewing the show, Howard Devree of the New York Times wrote that Pfeiffer's Spanish watercolors were "cleverly done" and were "light and fresh with detail well-realized and not impeding the fluency of the medium." A critic for the New York Post said the paintings were "sustained by delightful cool pure notes of color" and had a "concentration upon essentials and a simplicity of direct statement" that freed them "from the lushness and extravagance that one associates with Spanish themes."

By the early 1940s, Pfeiffer and Brillinger had separated and then divorced. He moved to Detroit and in 1942 married Hope Voorhees, an artist who had been one of his students. Pfeiffer and Voorhees moved to Buffalo in 1944. They spent the summer months in Provincetown and in the late 1940s began to live there year-round. He continued to contribute to group shows with other Provincetown painters. (Note: For example, see: Art News, August 1947; Art Digest, October, 1940; and New York Times, August 29, 1948, and August 19, 1951.)

During this period, Pfeiffer held solo exhibitions in Ypsilanti, Michigan; Buffalo; Detroit; Niagara Falls; and Hyannis, Massachusetts. In 1955 he participated in a duo show with Voorhees. Regarding this show, a critic for Art News wrote that Pfeiffer's paintings were "dynamic and explicit" abstractions.

Pfeiffer died during a fire in his Provincetown home.

=== Artistic style ===
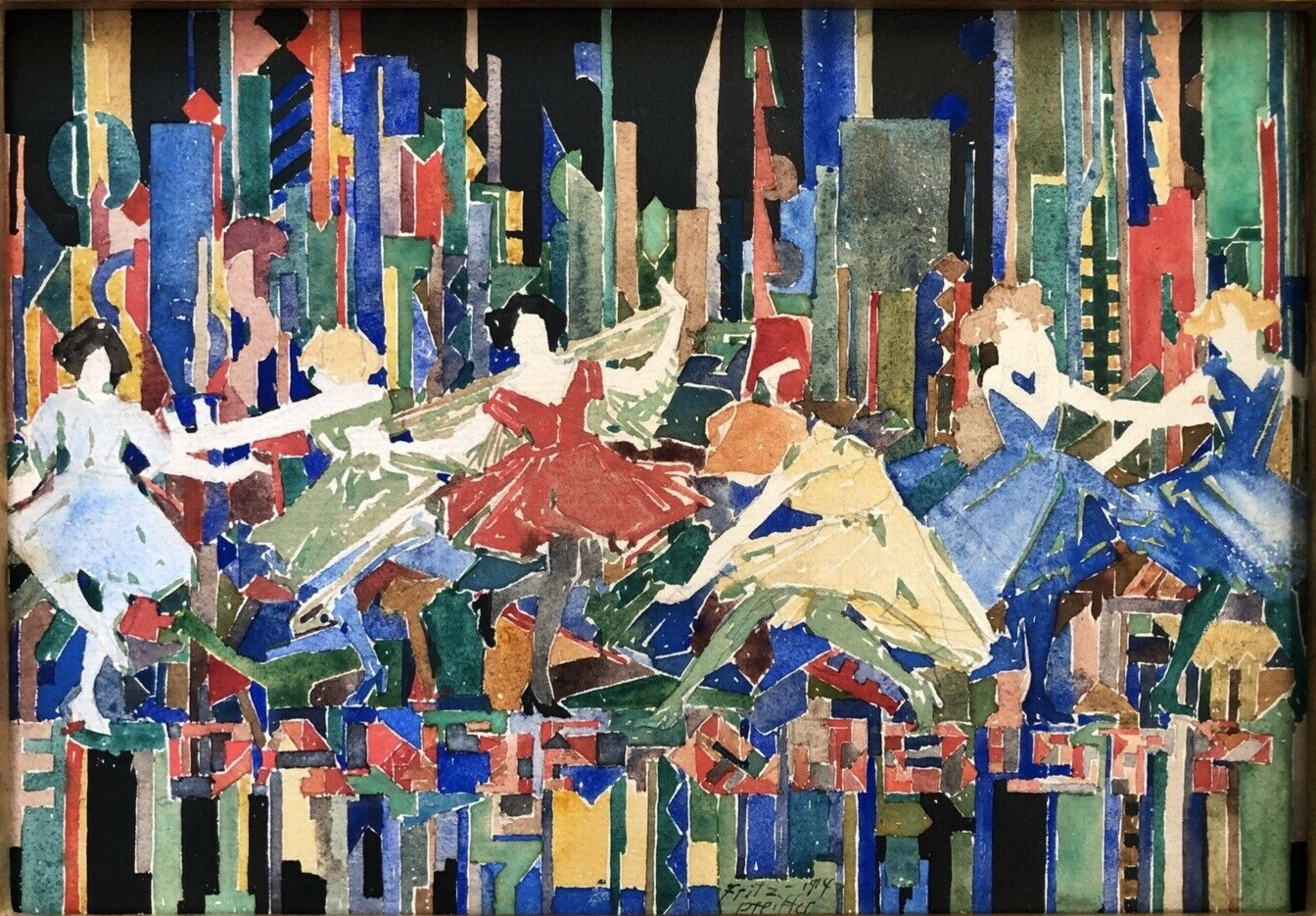
(1) Fritz Pfeiffer, Danse Cubiste, 1914, watercolor on paper, 7 x 10 inches

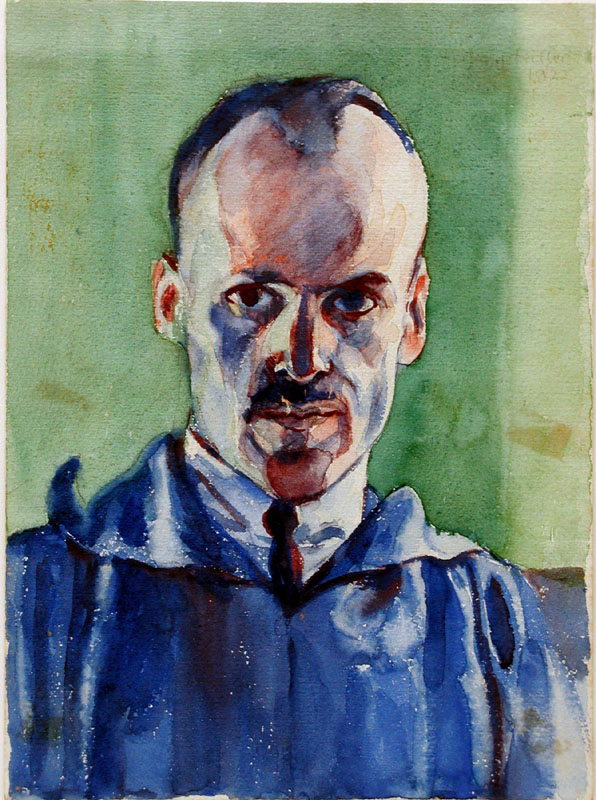
(2) Fritz Pfeiffer, Self Portrait, 1922, watercolor on paper, 9 1/2 x 7 inches

(3) Fritz Pfeiffer, Madrid, 1932, watercolor on paper, 12 x 15 inches

(4) Fritz Pfeiffer, Heinrich Pfeiffer's House, 1934, oil on canvas panel, 10 x 12 inches

(5) Fritz Pfeiffer, Untitled Abstract, 1942, oil on paper, 7 7/8 x 11 inches

(6) Fritz Pfeiffer, Untitled Abstract, 1957, oil on canvas, 30 x 24 inches

Pfeiffer employed two distinct styles. From the time he showed his paintings in the first decade of the century up to the end of the 1930s, he made landscapes, urban scenes, and figure paintings that were considered to be modernist but not completely abstract. In 1911, a critic noted in his work "a rare talent for portraying effects that are seen in daily life." Twenty-four years later, a reviewer saw "something almost fourth dimensional" in a painting that gave an exterior view from inside Pfeiffer's studio. In 1937, a journalist noted that Pfeiffer's modernist style produced some "disapproval" of one of his paintings when first seen, but added that it came, in time, to be "thoroughly enjoyed".

The painter of abstract conviction constantly strives for more clarity and purity of line—color—pattern. … Any shape, line or color when opposed to or shown in conjunction with another creates a movement or sensation which sets up a responsive action in the observer.

— Fritz Pfeiffer, "Abstractions in Paint Cause Lifted Eyebrows at Harvard", The Boston Globe, April 20, 1940, p. 13

His completely abstract paintings of the 1940s and 1950s were termed "non-objective" at the time. In 1940, an unsympathetic critic saw in them "a series of crisscrossing geometric patterns, with occasional splashes of color, and a straight line here and a curve there." Eight years later, a critic described them as having a "Kandinsky manner" and a few years later another said they stemmed "from the German interpretation of Cubism rather than Kandinsky".

Pfeiffer worked mostly in watercolor but also in oil. His palettes tended to be bright. Writing in 1935, one critic said that his colors were "pure" and in 1937 another said they were "prismatic". A decade later, a critic wrote that they were "raw". Pfeiffer once wrote that he aimed for clarity and purity in his work.

Although the geometry of circle and square furnishes the basis for most of his forms, each canvas is arranged to give a sense of elemental forces at work, the dramatic clash of sea and rock or the crackle of an electric storm. Adept at creating compositions which are both charged with movement and harmoniously balanced, Pfeiffer is able through the contrast of sharp opaque shapes with areas of nuance and transparency, to infuse an ordinarily static mode of painting with liveliness and a certain flashy vigor.

— "Fritz Pfeiffer and Hope Voorhees Pfeiffer", Art Digest, September 19, 1955, p. 26

A watercolor called "Danse Cubiste" of 1914, shown above, image number 1, shows his early handling of color and commitment to a degree of abstraction. Another watercolor, a self-portrait from 1922, shown above image number 2, suggests his technique for modeling figure subjects and his manner of handling light as well as his use of color for expressive purposes. A painting called "Madrid" of 1932 is an example of his relatively free technique in a cityscape. Shown above image number 3, it comes from a group that one critic called watercolor "sketches" and described as having a "concentration upon essentials and a simplicity of direct statement". Pfeiffer's handling of an architectural subject in oil can be seen in his painting, "Heinrich Pfeiffer's House" of 1934. The painting, shown above, image number 4, shows the home of his brother who lived in Provincetown year-round during that period. A few years later, Pfeiffer's supervisor in the Federal Art Project prepared a review of his work in which she wrote that he painted "unusual and fairly distinguished oil landscapes which seem to please conservative folks in spite of their rather modern quality."

The two untitled abstractions, shown above, images number 5 and 6, are examples of Pfeiffer's late-career style of pure abstraction.

== Art teacher ==
Pfeiffer taught art throughout his career. He led classes while living in York, Knoxville, Provincetown, Detroit, and Buffalo. While they were living in Knoxville, his wife ran a gift shop beside the studio where he taught. While living in Buffalo in the 1940s, he taught classes as an employee of the Albright Art Gallery.

== Personal life and family ==
Pfeiffer was born on June 3, 1889, in Gettysburg, Pennsylvania. He was the son of an elementary school teacher, Henry H. Pfeiffer (1845-1922), and Mary Jane Sourbier Pfeiffer (1845-1933). Pfeiffer was the youngest of eight children. In addition to Harry R. Pfeiffer (1874-1957), his brothers were Herman E. Pfeiffer (1872-1938), Thaddeus S. Pfeiffer (1876-1931), and J. Q. A. Pfeiffer (1871-1973). His sisters were Jennie and Alice who both died young as well as Virginia (1887-1972). Herman E. Pfeiffer was a real estate speculator, builder, and architect in York. Thaddeus S. Pfeiffer ran an automobile dealership in York. He settled a suit against his firm in 1918 and disappeared thereafter. In 1931, he was declared dead. John Quincy Adams Pfeiffer named a son after his brother. This Frederick William Pfeiffer died at the age of 54 on February 18, 1960, just four months before Pfeiffer himself died.

As noted above, Harry Pfeiffer, then called Heinrich, was a Provincetown artist and art store owner. He also ran the town's theater and the art gallery it contained. Before moving to Provincetown, he was a merchant in York. His first shop was called Pfeiffer Bros. When it opened in 1902, it sold bicycles and other sporting equipment. In time, it enlarged its stock to include "talking machines" and the cylinders that were the phonograph records of that time, as well as camera and photo supplies, and even perfumes. By 1904, Harry Pfeiffer had transformed it into an art store, selling pictures and frames as well as artists' supplies. The art shop closed in 1907 and two years later Harry was selling automobiles in a dealership called Pfeiffer Brothers. The local news outlets did not identify Harry's partner (or partners) in these businesses. If there were any, the most likely candidate is Thaddeus who in 1907 set up his own auto dealership.

Pfeiffer held socialist beliefs. In 1915, he attended a socialist luncheon in York and in the late 1930s was a member of a Communist front organization called the American Artists' Congress. His family had considerable socialist and left-leaning connections. His brother Harry had become a socialist at the turn of the century while working for a sewing machine works in New Jersey. Thereafter, he was an unsuccessful candidate for mayor in York and for congressman in the York congressional district. Pfeiffer's sister Virginia was a founder of York's Young People's Socialist League. In 1916, she married a man who was a strike leader, socialist speaker, and editor of a newspaper called York Labor News . Pfeiffer's family had a tradition of naming sons after pro-abolitionist statesmen of the Civil War era, including his brothers, John Quincy Adams Pfeiffer and Thaddeus Stevens Pfeiffer.

While living in Milwaukee, in 1918, Pfeiffer and his wife, Florence Billinger Pfeiffer, had a son, Ludwig Max Pfeiffer. This child died less than a year later in 1919. While living in York, in 1926, they had a second son, Sigmund Brillinger Pfeiffer. An electrical engineer, he worked for Western Electric in New Jersey and Massachusetts and died in 2014. Pfeiffer and his second wife, Hope Voorhees Pfeiffer, had no children.

Pfeiffer died in Provincetown on June 14, 1960. He had been hospitalized for injuries received during a fire at his home and did not recover. His remains were buried in Provincetown Cemetery.
