= William Freed =

American artist

- Born: 1902
- Died: 1984 (aged 81–82)
- Education: Alliance Art School, Art Students League of New York, Hans Hofmann School of Fine Art.
- Movement: American Modernist, WPA artist

William Freed (1902–1984) was an American artist known for his role as a member of the American Modernist vanguard of the 1930s, his innovation as a central figure in Abstract Expressionism, and for his colorful abstract paintings.

Freed's art education began at the Alliance Art School and continued at the Art Students League of New York and the Hans Hofmann School of Fine Art. Freed was also a WPA artist.

Freed's paintings are in major public collections including the Metropolitan Museum of Art, Whitney Museum of American Art, and the Cape Cod Museum of Art.

Freed was married to the artist Lillian Orlowsky for 42 years starting in 1942 and until Freed's death in 1984.
