= Max Bohm =

American painter

Max Boehm
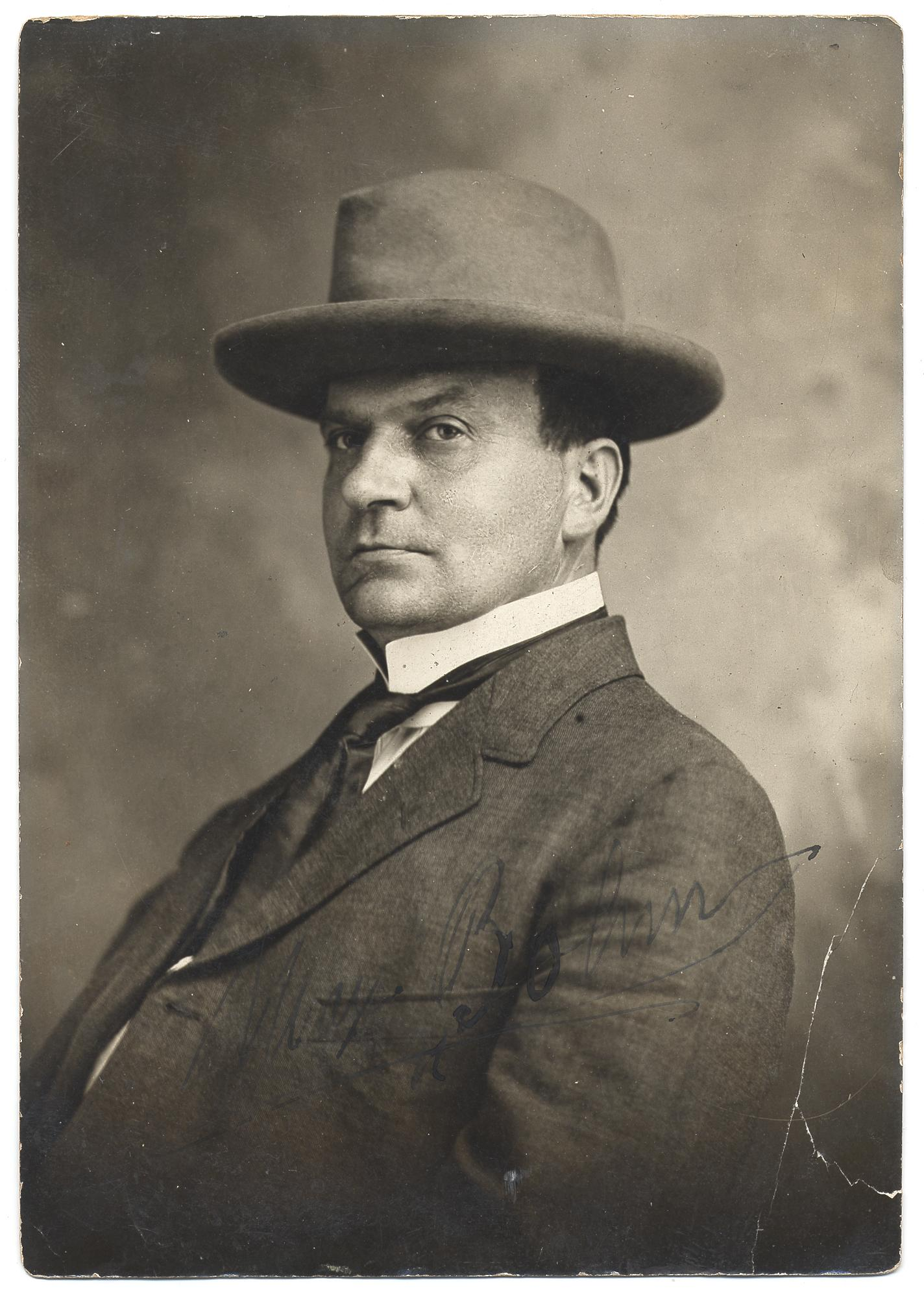
- "My only available photograph but it will do as it looks like me" - Max Boehm
- Born: 1868; Cleveland, Ohio
- Died: September 19, 1923 (aged 55); Provincetown, Massachusetts

Max Bohm (1868 – September 19, 1923) was an American artist who spent much of his time in Europe.

== Biography ==
Bohm was born in Cleveland, Ohio. He studied at the Académie Julian in Paris and travelled in Europe. Between 1895-1904 he made his home at the Etaples art colony. Described as a romantic visionary, his heroic depiction of Étaples fishermen received a gold medal at the Paris Salon in 1898. He went on to teach painting at a school in London until 1911 before returning to the United States to join the school of artists on Cape Cod.

Bohm became a National Academician in 1920, dying three years later in Provincetown, a town at the tip of Cape Cod. His paintings are among the collections of the Smithsonian Institution, the National Gallery of Art, and the Luxembourg Gallery in Paris; there is also a mural in his hometown at the Cuyahoga County Courthouse.

Bohm is a grandfather of artist Anne Packard.

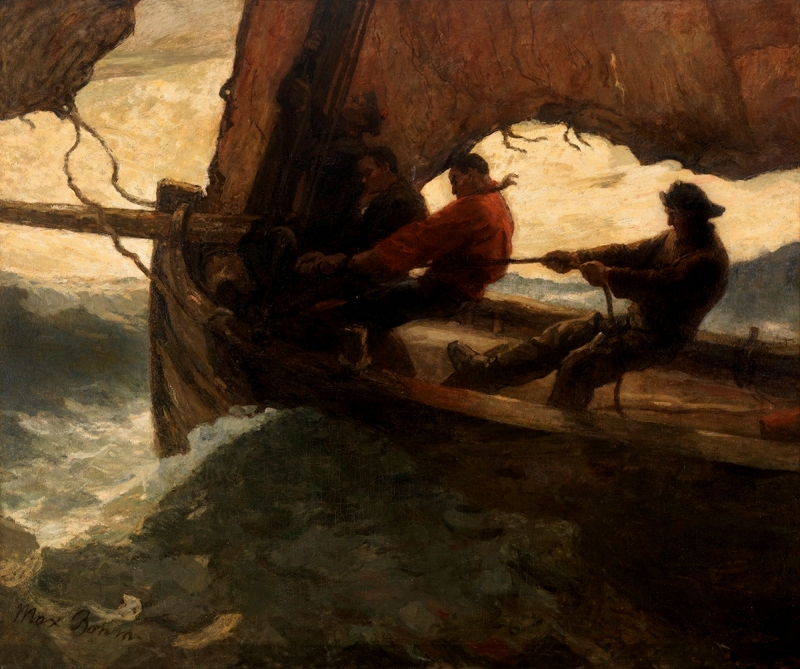
En Mer
