= Anne Packard =

American artist (born 1933)

- Born: 1933 (age 92–93); Hyde Park, New York
- Education: Bard College
- Occupation: Artist
- Relatives: Max Bohm (grandfather)

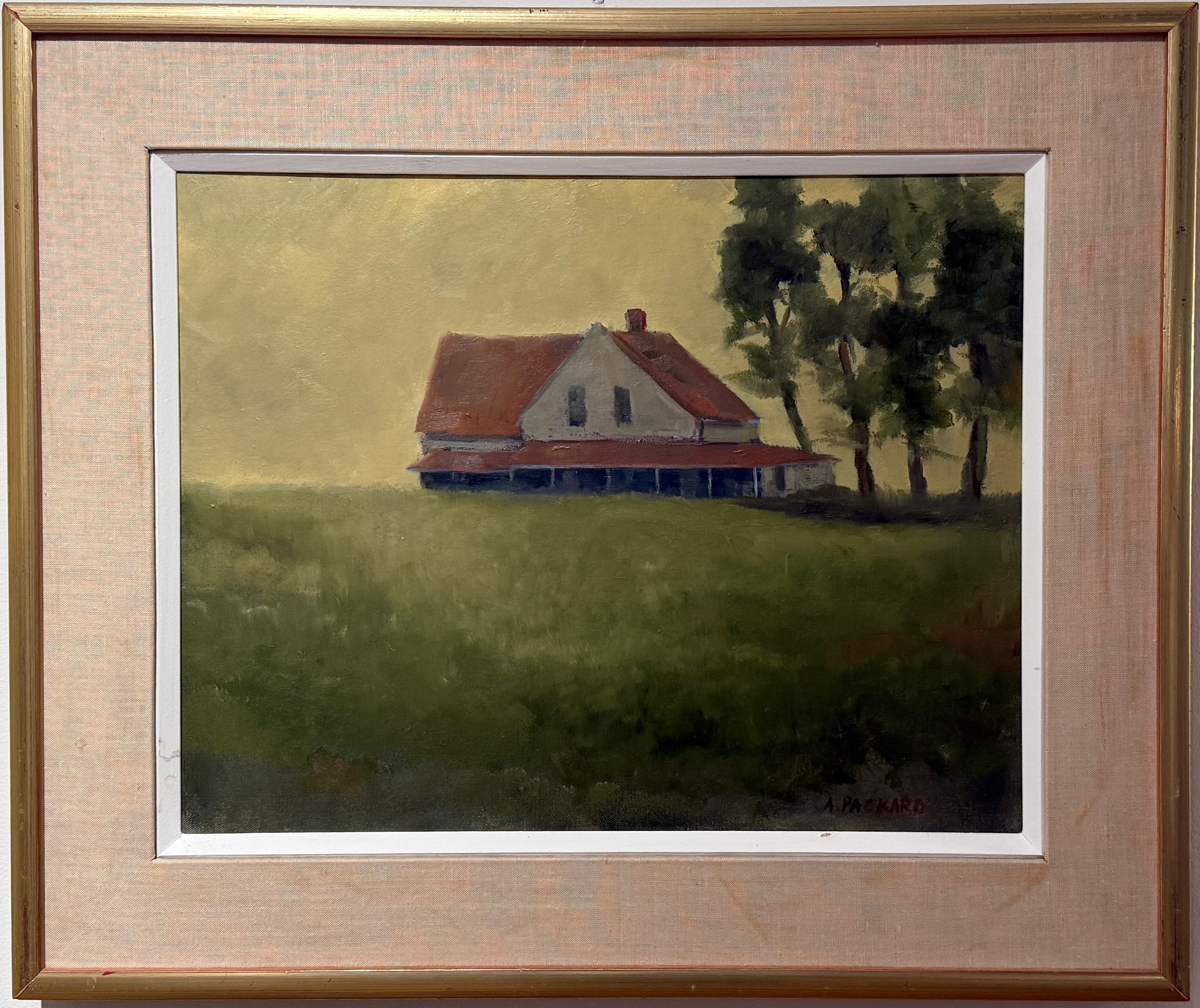
"Landscape with House," oil on canvas, 1987

Anne Packard (born 1933) is an American artist, widely known for atmospheric seascape paintings.

== Biography ==
Packard was born in 1933 in Hyde Park, New York. While growing up in Hyde Park, she spent her childhood summers in Provincetown, Massachusetts.

She comes from a family of artists, including her grandmother, Zella, and grandfather, Max Bohm, a 19th- and 20th-century romantic impressionist who was one of the founding members of an artist colony in Provincetown. She studied at Bard College in New York, and moved to Provincetown in 1977, where she apprenticed under Philip Malicoat.

Her daughters Cynthia Packard and Leslie Packard are also notable painters. Her son, Michael Packard, is the only person in recorded history to have been inside a whale's mouth and survive; he was freed as the whale dislodged him from its mouth.

Anne Packard opened her gallery, Packard Gallery, in 1988. The building is located in the Gallery District in Provincetown and was once home to a Christian Science Church.
