= Rose Chapman =

Rose Chapman may refer to:

- Rose Chapman (EastEnders), a character on the British soap opera EastEnders
- Rose Woodallen Chapman (1875–1923), American lecturer, author and editor
