= Sybilla Mittell Weber =

American painter (1892–1957)

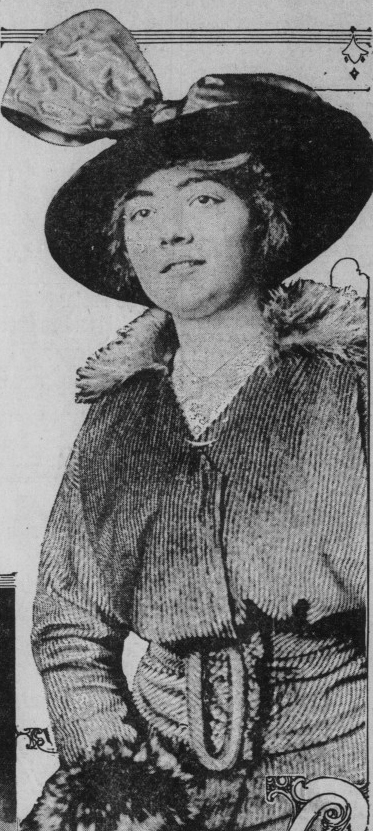
- Sybilla Mittell, 1914
- Born: Sybilla Mittell; May 31, 1892; Manhattan, New York, US
- Died: July 31, 1957 (aged 65); Danbury, Connecticut, US
- Resting place: Newton Cemetery, Newton, Massachusetts
- Known for: Artist, printmaker

Sybilla Mittell Weber (1892–1957) was an American artist known for her etchings and drypoints of dogs and horses. She was trained by an Austrian animal painter at the Academy of Fine Arts Munich and by an American etcher at the Art Students League. With the skills they taught her, she embarked on a long and successful career during which she employed traditional techniques to achieve results that drew consistent critical praise. Admired for her skill in animal portraiture and for her ability to portray animals in action, she was said to use an "economy of line" to achieve a style situated between the extremes of pure realism and pure abstraction.

== Early life and education ==
I had an unusual experience in Munich. I was the only woman in a class of 200 men who took the courses in anatomy at the veterinary school. I am a graduate veterinarian and am able to take excellent care of the animals in my charge.

— Sybilla Mittell Weber, San Francisco Call, April 17, 1914, p 10.

Weber was born and raised in New York City but spent summers in New Brunswick, Canada, in the countryside near Dumfries where her father ran a summer camp for boys. There, she would hunt and fish with her father and help out in nearby farms. During that time, she learned to love animals, particularly dogs and horses. As a child, she also would travel to Europe with her parents and later, as an art student, traveled to Germany on her own. (Note: Two genealogical websites, familysearch.com and ancestry.com, provide images from ship's manifests showing travels in 1901, 1911, and 1913.) In the years before the outbreak of World War I, she studied at the Academy of Fine Arts Munich and after returning to New York Weber said she believed the German art schools were better than the American ones of the time. At the academy, she studied under a prominent Austrian animal painter named Alfons Purtscher. Purtscher had been a favorite pupil of the German Impressionist, Heinrich von Zügel, whose main subjects were the cows and draft animals found on German farms. Weber's early commitment to domestic animals as subjects of her art can be seen in her decision to train as a veterinarian while studying in Munich. She later reported that she was the only woman in a class of 200 at the veterinary school she attended. Just before the outbreak of World War I, Weber returned to New York but continued to make periodic trips abroad. During one, she traveled to Ireland to see the Dublin horse show and to Cork to see dog racing. She also visited Poland for wild boar hunts and Madrid for a bullfight. In the mid-1920s, Weber took classes in printmaking at the Art Students League. There, her instructor was Joseph Pennell, who specialized in etchings, lithographs, and drawings. As his student, she became adept at making etchings and drypoints.

== Career in art ==
In February 1914, Weber attracted critics' attention with paintings of dogs and other domestic animals in a group show at the MacDowell Club in New York. Reporting on this exhibition, a reporter for the New York Sun said, "Art critics predict a wonderful career for Miss Sybilla Mittell, a nineteen-year-old New York girl". (Note: Weber was actually 21 years old at that time. Subtracting two years from her age was apparently seen as increasing readers' interest in her artistic debut.) In April 1914, theSan Francisco Call gave Weber an interview under the headline, "Girl Causes Stir by Remarkable Paintings of Animals". Both the Sun and the Call printed images of her paintings and, in its Spring issue for the same year, the magazine, International Studio, showed a reproduction of a painting of hers called "Foxhound". In 1915 Weber participated in two group exhibitions at the MacDowell Club. In the first, she showed what a critic described as "capital dog and cattle drawings". Other artists in the first group included Robert Henri, George Bellows, and Andrée Ruellan and she showed along with Josephine Paddock, Ernest D. Roth, Alta W. Salisbury, Susan Merrill Ketcham, Anna Milo Upjohn, and Emily Nichols Hatch in the second.

Sybilla Mittell Weber, Great Dane, etching, about 1932, 9 x 11 inches

Sybilla Mittell Weber, Four-in-Hand and Coach, etching, about 1931, 11 x 15 3/4 inches

Weber contributed four etchings to an exhibition held in conjunction with the Sesqui-Centennial International Exposition of 1926 in Philadelphia. One of the four, "Great Dane", is shown at left. In 1930, a publisher, William Edwin Rudge, began issuing Weber's prints. A drypoint of two Borzoi dogs was a first offering at $25. A critic described this print as "an interesting and brilliant study" that was "strong in handling yet distinguished for the delicacy of its line and distribution of light and shade". Two years later, she was given a solo exhibition at Milch Galleries on 57th Street in Manhattan. In it, she showed paintings, watercolors, and etching of horses, dogs, and other domestic and wild animals. Her painting, “The Four-in-Hand and Coach", in this show was cited by more than one critic as one of her best. This painting is shown at right. While praising the paintings and drawings as "excellent portraits" that drew out the individual characteristics of the "sitters", a critic singled out the etchings for their "skilled economy of line" and ability to convey, in one instance, the "speed and motion of youth" in a few strokes of the etcher's scribe and, in another instance, the"sense of poised flight". In that year, she also showed paintings and etchings in the Los Angeles Museum of Science and Art in an exhibition that coincided with the 1932 Summer Olympics. The following year, the Smithsonian Institution gave Weber a solo exhibition of fifty etchings of horses and dogs in the United States National Museum (now the National Museum of Natural History). Leila Mechlin, an art critic for the Evening Star, said Weber's etchings showed "utmost skill". Saying that Weber was equally good at depicting animals both at rest and in motion, Mechlin wrote, "If she etches a running, horse, it seems indeed to run. Her polo ponies are represented as in extreme action, but never with a sense of suspended motion. Her etchings are never snapshots; her subjects are never frozen" and she also said Weber's portraits of dogs, showed "life, character, significance". Over the next few years, Weber's prints appeared in solo and group exhibitions at the National Academy of Design in New York (1932); the Brooklyn Museum (1932); the Academy of Arts Gallery in Richmond, Virginia (1933); the gallery of the Junior League Club in Washington, D.C. (1935); the Library of Congress (1935); and the National Arts Club in New York (1935).

Sybilla Mittell Weber, Head of a Borzoi, etching, about 1932, 11 1/2 x 9 inches

Sybilla Mittell Weber, Polo IV, drypoint, 1938, 9 x 12 inches

During the 1930s and 1940s, she also participated in the annual exhibitions of the Water Color Club of Washington, D.C. In 1940, a critic praised a watercolor called "The Tandem". Noting that Weber was best known for her etchings, the critic said that in this painting, "she gives the impression of motion and indicates unmistakably the easy slip of muscles under animal skin, as well as the intelligence of creatures trained to action". A critic singled out a drypoint called "Polo" in the 1948 exhibition, saying the print showed "considerable action with an economy of line". This print is shown at right.

In April 1937, Weber's drypoint, "Racing II" (1936), was awarded top prize at the Philadelphia Print Club's annual exhibition. A critic for The Philadelphia Inquirer, praised the print's composition and noted that it showed the racing dogs it depicted as "very lively, motionful, muscular creatures, bending every ounce of their energy toward the goal". Later that year, the Kleeman Galleries in New York gave Weber a solo exhibition and two years later, prints by Weber appeared at the Venice Biennale in an exhibition of etchings and other metal-plate media by American artists.

In 1952, Weber took classes in engraving at the New York's Atelier 17 studio and afterward showed a color engraving of two flamingos in both the Society of American Graphic Artists annual exhibition of 1953 and the Portland Museum of Art during the same year. When a gallery in Boston gave Weber a solo exhibition of prints and paintings in 1954, a critic for The Boston Globe criticized her oils as "heavy in their handling" and having backgrounds "a little too dark and somber". However, this critic described the prints as "just right" and singled out a "striking head of a dog entitled 'Borzoi'". This drypoint is shown at left.

=== Artistic style ===
To better understand the subjects I wished to portray, I went into the brewery stables to study the huge Percheron horses that are so famous abroad. I also had permission from Prince Alfons of Bavaria to visit his famous stables and paint some of his blooded beauties. While I paint cows, dogs, and horses, I intend to specialize in dogs. I adore them.

— Sybilla Mittell Weber, San Francisco Call, April 17, 1914, p 10.

Weber painted in oil on canvas and in watercolor but was best known for prints made from metal plates. Critics said she made skillful use of traditional techniques to make her etchings, drypoints, and engravings. She did not aim for photographic realism, and, as one critic said, made style her uppermost concern "rather than details as to the animals".

Critics frequently noted her ability to show animals in motion. They also called attention to her "economy" or "delicacy" of line.

== Personal life and family ==
Weber was born in Manhattan on May 31, 1892. Her father, Philip Mittell (1865-1943), was a successful music teacher and concert violinist. He had been born in Mannheim, Germany, studied under Pyotr Ilyich Tchaikovsky and Anton Rubinstein at the Leipzig Conservatory of Music, and performed in an orchestra directed by Johannes Brahms. After emigrating to the United States in 1888, he embarked on a career as concert violinist and instructor in Manhattan. Her mother, Anna von Schmuss (or Schmauss) Mittell (about 1867-1929) was an artist in her youth, known for her portrait paintings. She had an older brother, Teja S. Mittell (1891-1979), whose wife, Lyn Donaldson Mittell (about 1892-1966), was an actress and concert soprano who performed using the name Lyana Donaz.

In 1921, Weber married Lothar E. Weber in Yonkers, New York. A consulting chemist in the rubber industry. He had been born in Vienna in 1886 and died in Buffalo, New York, only five years after their wedding in 1921. Weber died in Danbury, Connecticut, on July 31, 1957.
