= Lillian Cotton =

American artist

Lillian Cotton Impey (1892–1962) was an American painter.

== Early life and education ==
Lillian Cotton was born in Boston, Massachusetts in 1892. She received training in both the United States and Europe studying at the Boston Art Museum School. From 1915, she studied at the Art Students League of New York under Robert Henri for two years, then studied under André Lhote in Paris.

== Career ==
Cotton held her first exhibition in 1918 with the Society of Independent Artists. Over the next forty years she held various exhibitions across Paris and the United States, with the majority occurring in New York City.

=== Group memberships ===
Cotton was a member of several groups and galleries, including the National Association of Women Artists, New York Society of Women Artists, Allied Artists, Audubon Artists, Pen and Brush Club, and the Knickerbocker Artists.

== Personal life ==
In 1926, Cotton married Arthur E. Impey in France. He served as an officer in the British Army. During the 1940s, the couple owned a cottage on Martha's Vineyard. She died in New York City in 1962.

The Schlesinger Library at the Harvard Radcliffe Institute holds various materials related to Cotton's personal life and career, including artwork, scrapbooks and family photographs.

== Exhibitions ==
The following is a list of exhibitions by, or featuring works by, Cotton:

- 1918: Society of Independent Artists.
- 1924: Fearon Galleries, New York City.
- 1924–39: various exhibitions across Paris.
- 1931: Lucy Lamar Galleries, New York City.
- 1932: Pennsylvania Academy of the Fine Arts.
- 1933: Salons of America.
- 1941: New York Society of Women Artists.
- 1943: National Association of Women Artists.
- 1944: New York Society of Women Artists.
- 1945: Ferargil Galleries, New York City.
- 1946: National Association of Women Artists.
- 1946: New York Society of Women Artists.
- 1947: National Association of Women Artists.
- 1947: New York Society of Women Artists.
- 1947: Pen and Brush Club, New York City.
- 1948: Pen and Brush Club, New York City.
- 1949: Pen and Brush Club, New York City.
- 1950: Pen and Brush Club, New York City.
- 1952: National Association of Women Artists.
- 1952: New York Society of Women Artists.
- 1954: National Association of Women Artists.
- 1954: New York Society of Women Artists.
- 1956: Argent Gallery, New York City.
- 1959: City Center Gallery, New York City.
- 1959: Condon Riley Gallery, New York City.
- 1959: National Association of Women Artists.
- 1962: National Association of Women Artists.
