= Marion Campbell Hawthorne =

American painter

Ethel Marion Campbell Hawthorne (1870 (Note: Her grave marker gives a date of October 16, 1869) – April 16, 1945) was an American painter.

Born in Joliet, Illinois, Hawthorne studied at the School of the Art Institute of Chicago and with William Merritt Chase. She belonged to the Pen and Brush Club and the National Association of Women Painters and Sculptors. In 1903 she married the painter Charles Webster Hawthorne, with whom she had a son, Joseph. The couple's papers are held by the Archives of American Art at the Smithsonian Institution.
