= Janet Cook Lewis =

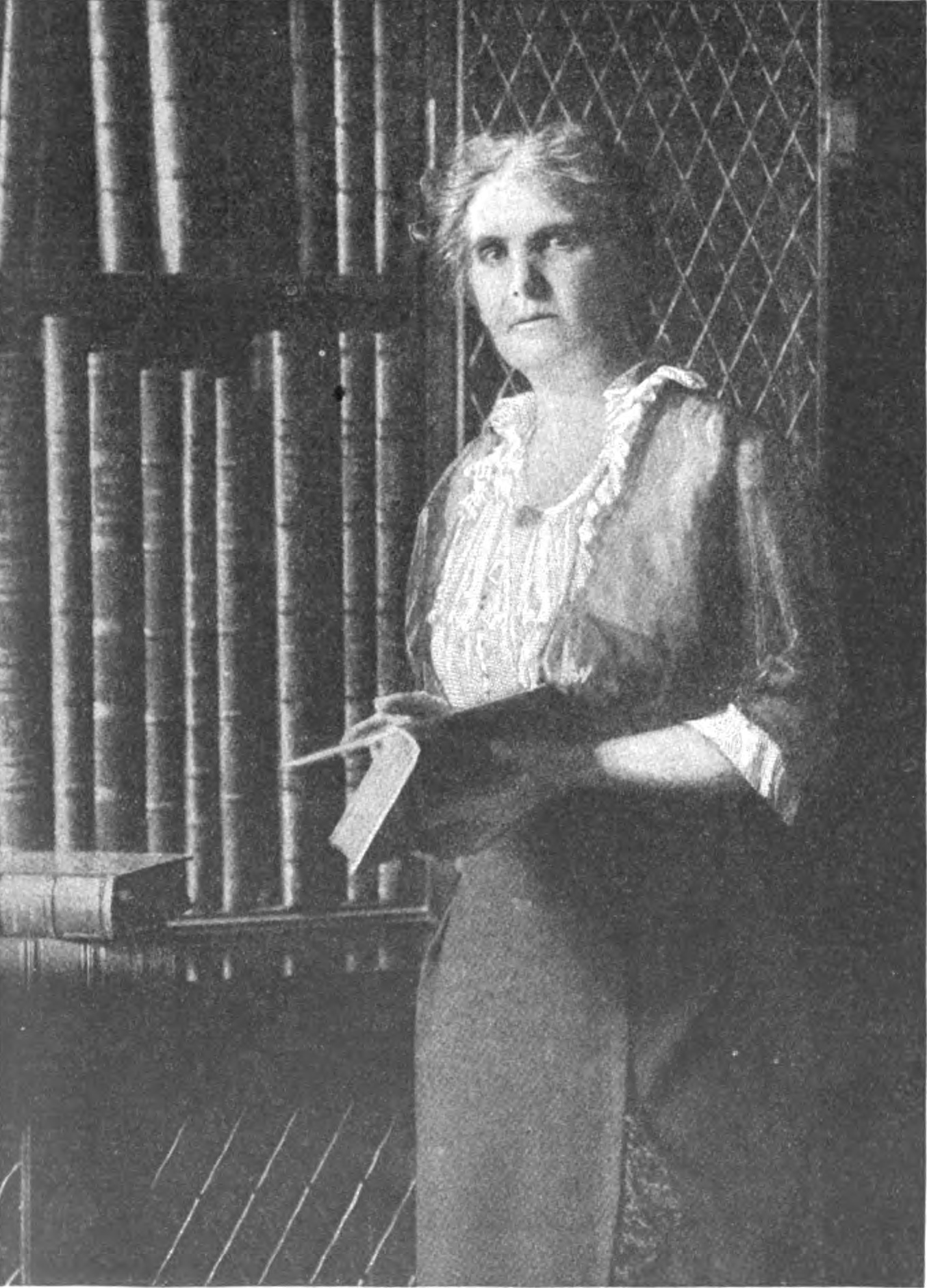
- Born: June 17, 1855; Columbus, Ohio, U.S.
- Died: January 18, 1947 (aged 91); San Diego, California, U.S.
- Education: Cooper Union
- Known for: portrait painter; librarian; bookbinder

Janet Cook Lewis (June 17, 1855 – January 18, 1947) was an American portrait painter, librarian, and bookbinder who specialized in book conservation and restoration. She was known as the "Doctor of Books". Lewis discovered a process for preventing disintegration of the bindings of books, the larger part of her active life having been spent in applying this treatment to the collections found in U.S. private libraries. Though she was educated as an artist, she was the first, and in her day probably the most reliable authority, on the subject of leather bindings and their preservation.

Lewis was an organizer and president of Toledo Woman's Exchange, 1884–90. During the period of 1890–96, she worked as a painter of portraits. Lewis was a pioneer worker in the interests of a woman's apartment house; in 1896, the Martha Washington Hotel was the outcome of the work done. She was a private secretary and librarian to Mrs. Richard Morris Hunt, and Lewis' later success was in the preservation of leather developed through the work in the Richard Morris Hunt Architectural and Art Library, where she served as librarian at least until 1914. She served as a consultant to the Museum of Fine Arts, Boston, the Union League Club, and to the Vatican Library. She was the organizer and treasurer of the Pen and Brush Club.

== Early life and education ==
Janet Cook Lewis was born in Columbus, Ohio, June 17, 1855. (Note: According to Weidman (2000), Janet was born "circa 1855".) Her parents were William Hall and Eleanore Clark Lewis. Her father was a dealer in hides and furs. On his side, she was descended from Anthony Rawling, who came from Whitby, England, and settled in New York City, in 1763; on her mother's side, from Joseph Stephens, an officer in the American Revolution.

When a young girl, Lewis resolved to become an artist. She was educated at Toledo High School, studied portraiture in New York City, and attended Cooper Union for four years.

== Career ==
=== Painter ===
Following her graduation, she established herself in a studio on West 23rd Street. Although primarily involved in the painting of portraits, she was also interested in everything affecting women. Not long after she arrived in New York, she became aware that living conditions for women could be vastly improved. There was no place for them but hotels and boarding houses. Apartment buildings did not exist. For a time, she lived in an apartment at Marlborough Arms, but, irked by the hotel life and utter absence of the home atmosphere, she began to open the subject of living quarters for women with other artists and salaried women. All were of one mind in that they felt the need of something better than existed, but nothing definite came of such discussions until the "bachelor girl" idea was conceived.

=== "Bachelor girls" ===
In the late 1890s, Lewis while Lewis was working from her home in West 23rd Street, the old residences along the street were being turned into business houses. The old Van Renssalaer home was the first of the brownstone residences to be made over into studios and living apartments. The Twelfth Night Club's first home was in the building, and Lewis, with three other artist friends, of whom one was her sister, Minnie A. Lewis, joined to live in one of the apartments. These pioneers brought public attention to the great need of apartment homes for cultured women, and their establishment may be said to have opened the way to the later growth of the apartment house movement in New York and other cities. "Bachelor girls" became the popular phrase of the era, and the four women on West 23rd Street received a great deal of attention from the newspapers.

Lewis' apartment was beautiful, with a kitchen and a dining room. The furniture was mostly Chippendale with a few modern pieces. An ancient brass warming pan and fire irons were in evidence, along with a samovar and a tea set. In this studio was established the Pen and Brush Club, which became the most notable organization of women writers, painters, sculptors and crafters in the U.S. Lewis was first to suggest the idea, and she was honored as the Founder.

While busy painting portraits, Lewis did not lose the greater idea which had come to her earlier in her New York life — the establishing of some central home for women, one large building, cut up into living apartments. Through the influence of Elizabeth Bacon Custer, Lewis made the acquaintance of Candace Wheeler, in whom she found a kindred spirit. Their mutual interest resulted in a definite plan of action, to build an apartment house with money raised by subscription from women. Lewis became so absorbed in this work, that eventually, she gave up everything else to push it. After great efforts, the movement obtained funds and an option on a plot of ground. Plans were made, based on a definite cost, when the architect suddenly died. It was then found advisable to cancel this option, but later an option was obtained on another property, all the arrangements were made and the contracts almost let, when Lewis suffered a breakdown from overwork and was obliged to stop everything and go abroad for her health. When she returned, she found that several of the women who had subscribed had organized under the name of the Women's Hotel Club and had engineered matters in a direction quite unlike Lewis' original idea, and she abandoned the whole project. Their efforts resulted in the building of the Martha Washington Hotel, but Lewis was not interested in a hotel — it was the apartment house for which she was striving.

=== Bookbinder ===
Her work as a portrait painter had brought her into contact with many prominent New York women, among them Catherine Clinton Howland Hunt (Mrs. Richard Morris Hunt). When visiting the Hunt home one day, Lewis was invited to inspect the beautiful art work on some of the book bindings in the library. After her husband's death, Mrs. Hunt desired to get the vast collection of architectural books classified and catalogued for the use of her sons, but was so dismayed by the size of the task, she looked about for someone competent to assist her. This must be one who loved books, appreciated their value, and who could be trusted to handle them with care. She turned to Lewis, who knew nothing of library work, but that was no handicap because Mrs. Hunt had very pronounced ideas of her own, and desired nothing so much as someone to carry them out. Lewis joined in the task of classifying, cataloguing, and otherwise systematizing the Hunt Architectural and Art library.

As she progressed with the work, Lewis was distressed to find many of the expensive bindings disintegrating and falling to pieces. Love for and sympathy with the inarticulate, as well as a desire to rescue objects of such priceless value, gave her the impetus toward inventing or discovering something that would prevent this decay and waste. She began to study the various forms of bindings, the style of printing and the different textures and materials which bookbinders have used throughout the centuries. Living as she did in this atmosphere of books, she came to know the various diseases which attack old volumes, and tried to find some compound which would arrest the destroying effects of age and worms. Rare books as they grow older, suffer from the infirmities of age. Old books require a special regimen. Those bought abroad and transported to the U.S. were peculiarly sensitive to the atmospheric change. Lewis discovered that books need air and light in order to remain healthy. She found that when books are confined in cases behind glass doors which shut out the air they rapidly disintegrate. She observed that packing books into a case without regard for the proper spacing was equivalent to stifling them. But she searched in vain for an antidote which should make old books as new.

Fortunately, she became aware of the work of Professor William Pennington, a noted chemist, who was called as an expert to analyze the geological deposit created by the washing up of a school of fish on the rank vegetation bordering the Gulf of Mexico. This deposit, when properly retorted, produced a vegetable and animal oil, effectively assimilated by leather, which leather chemists claimed had a preservative quality. As Lewis gained experience in using these oils, she grew bolder and made experiments on her own account; so that when the library was completely catalogued and ready for the expert who came to appraise it, he exclaimed in surprise, declaring he had never seen old leather bindings in such excellent condition.

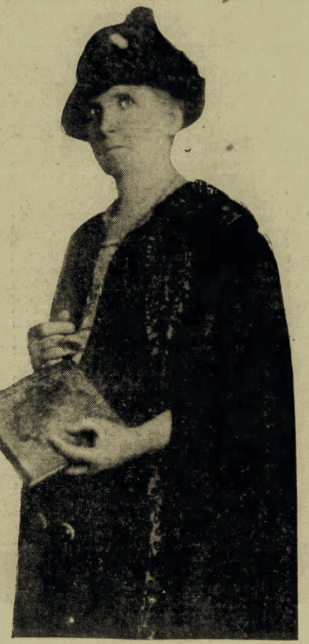
1926

Lewis knew she had found what she had so long been seeking. Having her remedy, she set out to prove it to a doubting world. Experienced librarians smiled at her statements. One or two, who were willing to be convinced, permitted her to try her compound on some of their less valuable works, and the changed aspect of the worn old volumes, which had been given up as doomed to disintegration, impressed them. Belle da Costa Greene, head librarian of the J. P. Morgan collection of old volumes and early manuscripts, heard of the work being done by her fellow-librarian. She came, looked upon the results obtained, and was convinced. Lewis was heartily recommended to Mr. Morgan as the ideal person to restore his library, in which thousands of priceless books were in danger from the countless perils which beset them. Lewis had opportunity here to test her process on every kind of binding, from the hardest old pigskin to those of unrivalled beauty and delicacy. The application of her lubricant required the hand of the trained expert; careless application would either soil, or do irreparable injury; it was essential to know how much of the oil the leather and other material would absorb, a knowledge gained only through experience.

Her unique service attracted the attention of newspapers and magazines, and Lewis was called "Doctor of Books". Her fame was well established through her work in the Morgan library and she was sought after by libraries everywhere, in the U.S. and abroad. Among other things, she was called upon to deal with the effects of bookworms. It was found that her solution not only restored leather bindings but contained antiseptic qualities, making it undesirable to insects and germs. While working in the Boston Athenæum library, she found the bindings of a hundred volumes destroyed by bookworms.

Lewis was often called upon to give lectures on her work, speaking before clubs and over the radio. These talks contained interesting facts and were replete with allusions to famous books and persons.

== Personal life ==
In religion, Lewis was Episcopalian.

Janet Cook Lewis died in San Diego, California, January 18, 1947.
