= Dorothy Giles =

Writer

Dorothy Giles (April 27, 1892 – December 29, 1960) was an American freelance writer, journalist, editor and local historian. She was author of several books.

== Biography ==
Giles was born on April 27, 1892 in Cold Spring, New York. The parents of Dorothy Giles, Richard Giles (1861–1918) and Ida Rosina Webb married in June 1891, in New York City. Richard Giles was a physician who practiced medicine on Fair Street in Cold Spring, Putnam County, New York. Dorothy Giles's brother Richard L. Giles was born in 1895. Dorothy Giles studied art and languages and graduated from the Cathedral School of St. Mary, the sister school of St. Paul's School in Garden City, New York.

While pursuing her career as a journalist, Dorothy Giles, for many years, grew vegetables, flowers, and fruits in a home garden in Cold Spring, her hometown along the banks of the Hudson River.

She published the 1922 pamphlet Down the Garden Path and the 1926 book The Little Kitchen Garden. As an influential member of the Putnam County Historical Society, Dorothy Giles had a home on Pauling Avenue in Cold Spring and was active in community affairs. In 1924 her book Adventures in Brotberhood was published.

Giles wrote two travel books: The Road Through Spain (1929) and The Road Through Czechoslovakia (1930). Tomáš Masaryk, President of Czechoslovakia, honored her for her 1930 travel book — she became the first woman to receive the silver medal of the Order of the White Lion, Knight Class. She became a member of the American Friends of Czechoslovakia (an American association which helped Czechoslovak refugees during and after both World Wars). She also belonged to the Pen and Brush Club.

Giles was a staff member of Cosmopolitan Magazine from 1933 to 1939. In 1940 Random House published her book Singing Valleys: The Story of Corn — the food historian Cynthia Clampitt called the book a "classic". Among Dartmouth College Library's archival and manuscript collections, there is the Singing Valleys typescript with handwritten corrections and printer's marks.

In 1945, the famous singer Sophie Tucker published an autobiography Some of These Days: The Autobiography of Sophie Tucker, written in collaboration with Dorothy Giles. Giles was a ghostwriter for Gypsy Rose Lee, among other celebrities. Giles was a ghostwriter for Edwin Main Post Jr.'s 1961 book Truly Emily Post.

In 1949, G. P. Putnam's Sons published Giles's book A candle in her hand; a story of the nursing schools of Bellevue Hospital. She was a member of the American Craftsmen's Educational Council, which initiated the exhibition "Designer Craftsmen U.S.A. 1953". The exhibition opened at the Brooklyn Museum and was subsequently displayed at the Art Institute of Chicago and the San Francisco Museum of Art. The 72-page exhibition catalogue contains 111 black-and-white images and a 10-page essay by Dorothy Giles.

After Dorothy Giles died in December 1960, her collaborator Irma Franklin completed their historical and genealogical compilation Thomas Davenport, Philipstown pioneer, 1682-1759, and his descendants, which was published in 1962 by the Putnam County Historical Society.
