= Jeanie Oliver Davidson Smith =

American poet and romancist (1836–1925)

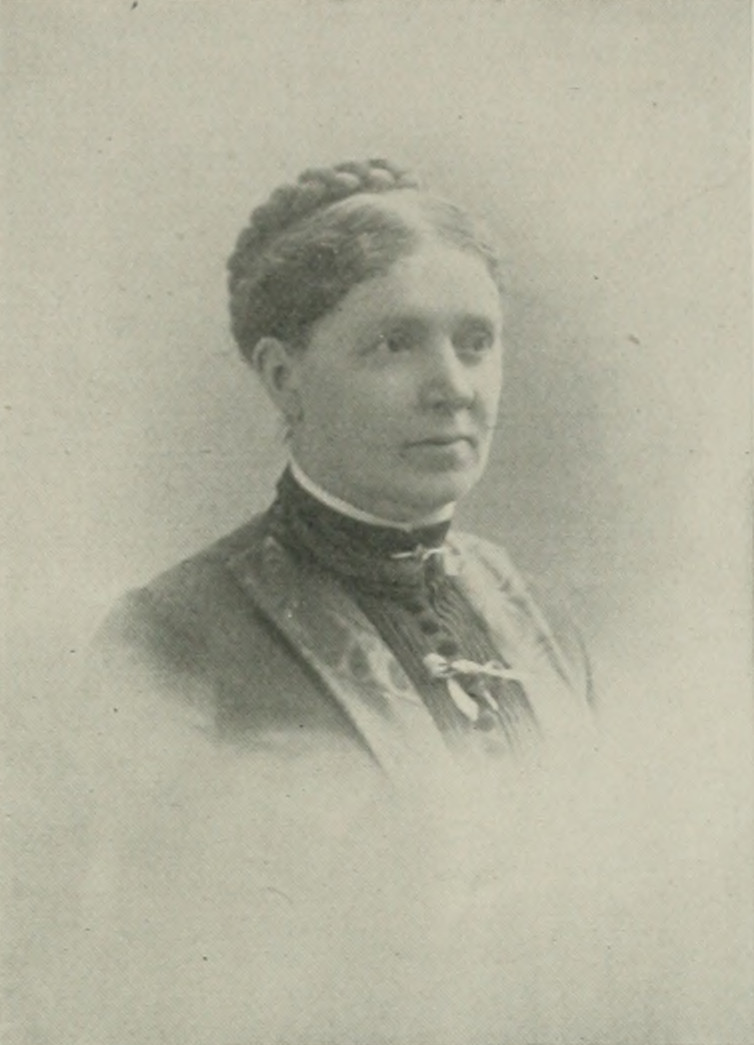
- Portrait from "A Woman of the Century"
- Born: Jeanie Oliver Davidson; 1836; Troy, New York, US
- Died: November 16, 1925 (aged 88-89); Johnstown, New York
- Occupations: poet; romancist
- Writing career
- Pen name: Temple Oliver
- Language: English

Jeanie Oliver Davidson Smith (née, Davidson; pen name, Temple Oliver; 1836 – November 16, 1925) was an American poet and romancist. She contributed to leading British and U.S. magazines and published several books, continuing her writings almost to the time of her death.

== Early life and education ==
Jeanie Oliver Davidson was born in Troy, New York, 1836. Her parents were Richard and Margaret Oliver (Amos) Davidson. Her father was Scottish by birth and was well known in Troy as a philanthropist; he later became a resident of New York City. Her mother was a member of the Oliver family, conspicuous in southern Scotland. From both parents, she inherited poetic and artistic tendencies. When her mother died, the young girl went with an aunt to Scotland, and for five years, she lived in Edinburgh, where she was educated thoroughly and liberally. After graduation, she returned to the United States.

== Career ==
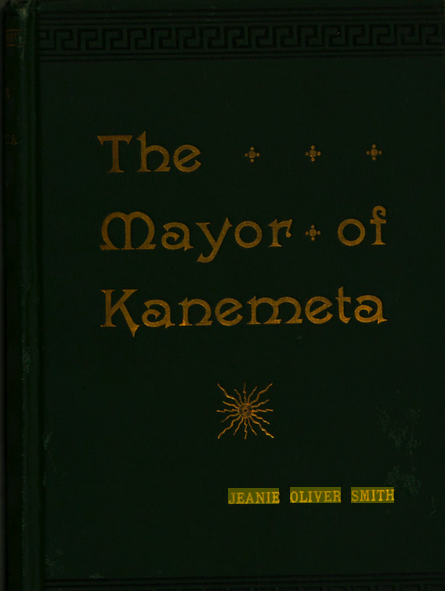
The Mayor of Kanemeta (1891)

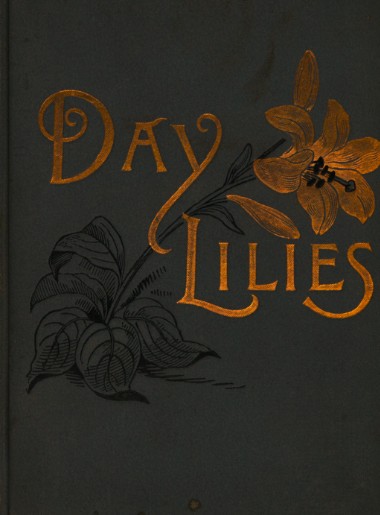
Day Lilies (1889)

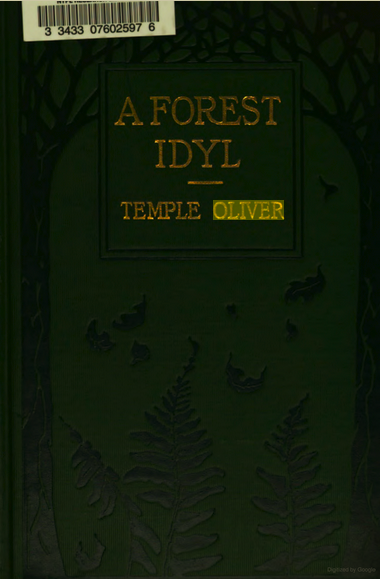
A Forest Idyl (1913)

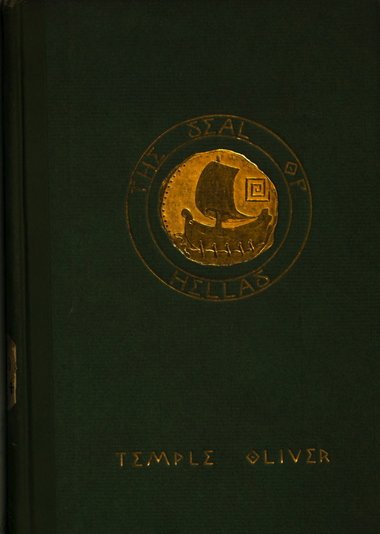
The Seal of Hellas (1915)

At an early age, she married Hon. Horace E. Smith (d. 1902), dean of the Albany Law School. After her marriage, she lived in Johnstown, New York where her home was known as a social and literary center. She cared for her two young daughters and for the large family of her husband by a former marriage. Her time was filled with literary, society and charitable work, and she was especially interested in religious and educational matters.

Her literary productions were numerous and included poems, tales and sketches. She contributed to leading British and U.S. magazines, such as The Magazine of Poetry, Christian at Work, and others. She published a volume of poems, Day Lilies (New York, 1889), which passed into its second edition and won her substantial reputation as a poet. She was the author of The Mayor of Kanameta (New York, 1891), a story on sociological lines, also Donald Moncrieff, a companion book to the former (Buffalo, 1892). Her finest work was done in verse.

She was a member of the Society of American Authors, Aldine Literature Society, New York Presbyterian Church, Authors League of America, and the Pen and Brush Club of New York.

== Later life and death ==
She continued her writings almost to the time of her death. Jeanie Oliver Davidson Smith died at her home in Johnstown, New York, November 16, 1925.

== Selected works ==
- Day Lilies, 1889
- Christmas Day, 189?
- The Mayor of Kanemeta, 1891
- Donald Moncrieff, 1892
- Stories of Fido and Hunter, 1896
- The Story of Blackie, 1896
- The Christ: A Poetical Study of His Life from Advent to ..., 1899 (with Obadiah Cyrus Auringer)
- Sonnets of Life, 1911
- A Forest Idyl, 1913
- The Seal of Hellas: (a Classical Drama)
- The Story of Zephyr: A Christmas Story, 1917
