= Mary Wood-Allen =

American doctor, social reformer, lecturer, and writer

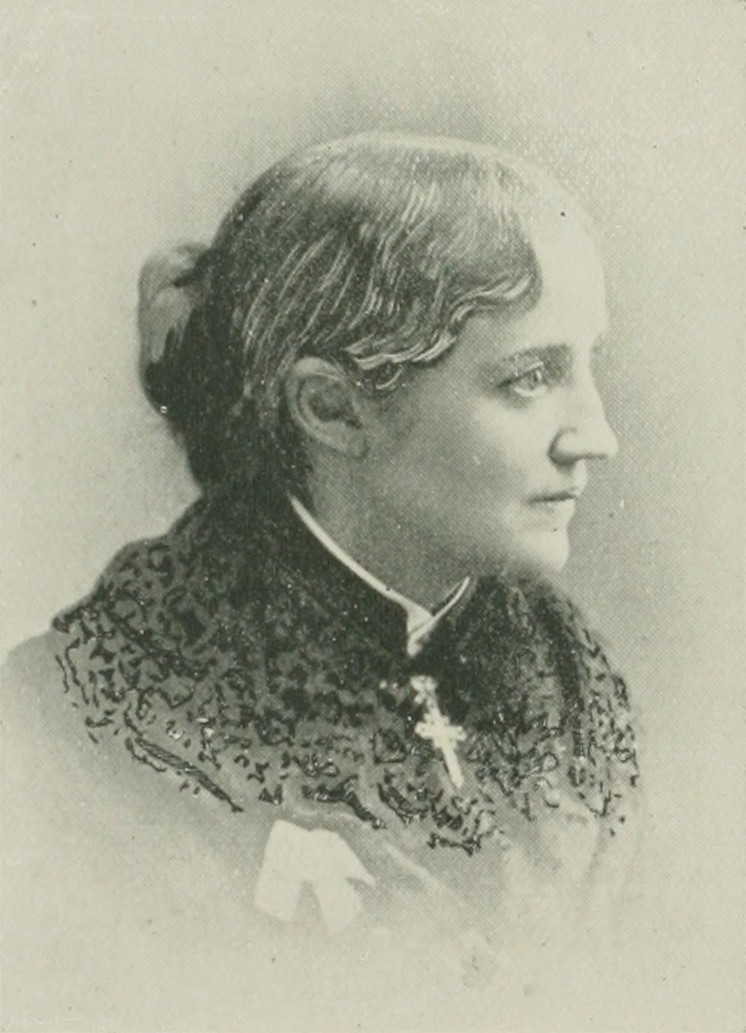
Portrait from A Woman of the Century

Mary Augusta Wood-Allen (October 19, 1841 – January 21, 1908) was an American doctor, social reformer, lecturer, music teacher, composer, and writer of books on health and self-improvement for women and children. Through her lectures and writings she was a voice for the social purity movement.

== Biography ==
Mary Augusta Wood was born in Delta, Ohio, the daughter of George Wood and Sarah (Seely) Wood. Starting at the age of fifteen she earned money as a music teacher, which allowed her to attend Ohio Wesleyan Female College, graduating in 1862.

After teaching for a time at the Battleground Collegiate Institute in Battle Ground, Indiana, she married Chillon Brown Allen, a lawyer, and took the surname Wood-Allen.

After three years studying in Vienna, Austria, Wood-Allen earned a medical degree from the University of Michigan at Ann Arbor in 1875. She went into practice in Newark, New Jersey. In 1883, she was appointed "Lecturer of Heredity and Hygiene" for the National Woman's Christian Temperance Union (WCTU) at the suggestion of Frances Willard and lectured widely on these subjects. In 1892, she became superintendent of the WCTU's Purity Department, and in 1897, she became Superintendent of Purity for the World WCTU.

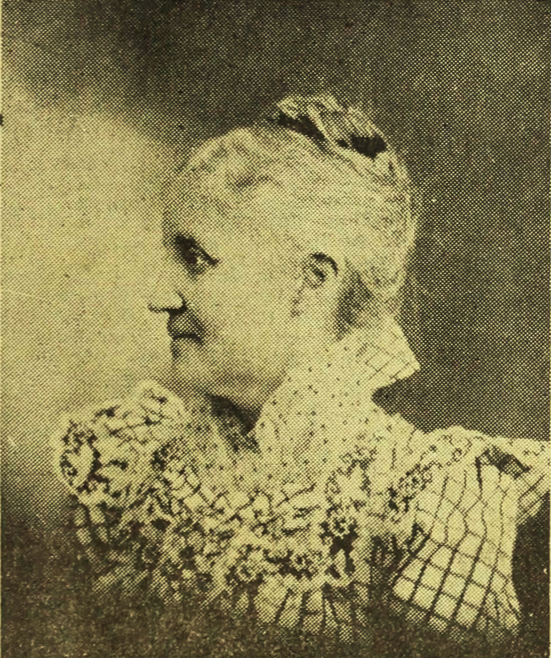
(1904)

In 1895, through her family's Wood-Allen Publishing Company in Ann Arbor, Wood-Allen started a series of monthly leaflets titled Mother's Friend, which was co-edited by Estelle M. H. Merrill. It later became a monthly magazine titled The New Crusade and was edited by Wood-Allen alone with her daughter as assistant editor. Later, this became The American Mother and then American Motherhood and continued publication until 1919. Wood-Allen published the magazine herself with the assistance of her son and daughter. She also published a number of books. Her poem "Motherhood" was well known in its day.

The Wood-Allen Publishing Company also published at least one book by Delos Franklin Wilcox (Ethical Marriage (1900)).

== Family ==
Wood-Allen and Chillon Brown Allen married on April 15, 1863, and had separated by 1880. Wood-Allen's children were Mario Chillon Wood-Allen (1870–1936) and Rose Wood-Allen Chapman (1875–1923). Rose wrote articles and books of advice on child-rearing; in 1907, Rose took her mother's place as the National Superintendent of Purity for the WCTU.

Wood-Allen died in Washington, D.C., in 1908.

== Publications ==
- The man wonderful in the house beautiful: an allegory teaching the principles of physiology and hygiene, and the effects of stimulants and narcotics (1883; with her husband Chilion B. Allen)
- Teaching Truth (1892)
- The Birth Chamber (1895)
- The Man Wonderful: The Marvels of Our Bodily Dwelling (1895)
- What a Young Woman Ought to Know (1898; with Sylvanus Stall)
- Ideal Married Life: A book for all husbands and wives (1901)
- Marriage: Its Duties and Privileges (1901)
- Child-Confidence Rewarded (1903)
- What a Young Girl Ought to Know (1905)
- Almost a Man (1907)
- Almost a Woman (1907)
- Making the Best of Our Children (2 vols, 1909)
