= Estelle M. H. Merrill =

American journalist and editor

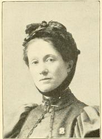
- Photo in The history of the woman's club movement, 1898
- Born: Estelle Minerva Hatch; September 30, 1858; Jefferson, Maine, U.S.
- Died: July 20, 1908 (aged 49); Cambridge, Massachusetts, U.S.
- Education: Wheaton Seminary
- Occupations: journalist, editor
- Spouse: Samuel Merrill (m. 1887)
- Writing career
- Pen name: Jean Kincaid
- Language: English
- Notable work: Cambridge sketches by Cambridge authors

Estelle M. H. Merrill (née, Hatch; pen name, Jean Kincaid; September 30, 1858 – July 29, 1908) was an American journalist and editor of the long nineteenth century. Well-known as a leader and speaker in women's club circles, her lectures especially focused on educational and sociological questions. Merrill was a charter member of the New England Woman's Press Association and served as the editor of the New England Kitchen Magazine.

== Early life and education ==
Estelle Minerva Hatch was born in Jefferson, Maine, on September 30, 1858. She was the daughter of Gilman E. and Celenda S. Hatch.

As a child, Merrill attended the public schools of her native town. At fourteen years of age, she entered Wheaton Seminary, Norton, Massachusetts, graduating in 1877.

== Career ==
Upon her graduation, she returned to Jefferson to teach. At the end of two years' successful work in that place, she again came to Massachusetts, and taught school for three years in Hyde Park. She worked towards establishing in the public schools of Hyde Park an additional course, giving practical business training, opportunities for which previously could be obtained only at private schools.

A lover of nature from her girlhood, when she used to wander through the Maine woods, during her periods of teaching in the grammar and high school grades at Hyde Park, she was fitting herself at the Harvard Annex and with private teachers to take a professorship in botany, her favorite study. A break in health, the result of overwork, necessitated rest and change. During her long convalescence, she spent more time writing, her first regular work as a journalist being on The Boston Daily Globe (Boston). From furnishing special articles, she progressed to a salaried position. Journalism became such a fascinating occupation that, though she was offered a lucrative professorship in botany at a Southern college, she chose to remain in the newspaper field.

Merrill furnished articles at intervals for the Boston Transcript, written under the signature of "Jean Kincaid." The Business Woman's Journal opened two new departments in June 1890, with Merrill heading one which was devoted to the interests of journalists. In the 1890s, she was the editor of the New England Kitchen Magazine a Domestic Science Monthly published by The New England Kitchen Publishing Company (Boston). Merrill served as co-editor, with Dr. Mary Wood-Allen, of American Motherhood, a Boston magazine devoted to the interests of mothers and home-makers.

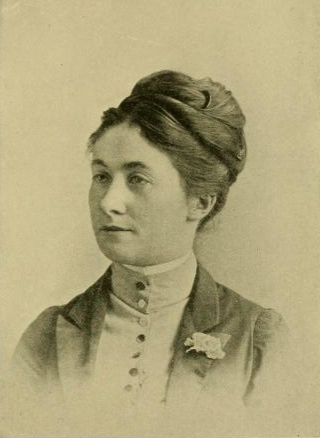
(from an 1897 publication)

She gave lectures on a variety of subjects, especially on educational and sociological questions. She was well-known as a leader and speaker in the club world. Merrill was the founder of the Cantabrigia Club, of which she became honorary vice-president; was one of the charter members of the New England Woman's Press Association, its first secretary, and later served as its president; first president of the New England Wheaton Club,; president of the Wheaton Seminary Club; member of the Fathers' and Mothers' Club; vice-president of the Woman's Charity Club; and an officer in the Associated Charities of Cambridge, Massachusetts.

== Personal life ==
On October 1, 1887, she married Samuel Merrill, a native of Charlestown, New Hampshire, a member of the Suffolk County, Massachusetts bar, and of the editorial staff of the Boston Globe.

Estelle M. H. Merrill died on July 29, 1908, in Cambridge, Massachusetts.

== Selected works ==
- Cambridge sketches by Cambridge authors, 1896
