= Joseph Hawthorne =

American conductor, violinist, violist, and military officer

Joseph Campbell Hawthorne (1908 – March 20, 1994) was an American conductor, violinist, violist, and military officer. Born in Provincetown, Massachusetts, he was the son of artists Charles Webster Hawthorne and Ethel "Marion" Campbell. After receiving his childhood education at the Brooklyn Friends School, he entered Princeton University where he graduated in 1930. He then pursued further studies at the Juilliard School and at the American Conservatory in Fontainebleau, France. His career was interrupted by World War II and he served as a lieutenant in the United States Navy during the war in a development detachment of the Atlantic fleet. In November 1949 he married Hazel Wragg, a marriage which lasted until his death nearly 45 years later.

Following World War II, Hawthorne served as both principal violist and associate conductor for the Dallas Symphony Orchestra and was a conductor of the Dallas Training Orchestra. In 1953, he conducted in the Naumburg Orchestral Concerts, in the Naumburg Bandshell, Central Park, in the summer series. From 1955–1963 he was conductor of the Toledo Symphony Orchestra. In 1959 he became the first music director of the Toledo Opera. He also held conducting posts with the Chattanooga Symphony, the Duluth Superior Symphony Orchestra, the National Orchestral Association, and the Orchestra of the American Composers Forum. He was the founder of the Provincetown Symphonic Society and guest conducted orchestras in North America, Europe, and Israel.
