= Martha Simkins =

American painter (1866–1969)

Martha E. Simkins
- Born: 1866; Monticello, Florida, United States
- Died: April 15, 1969 (aged 102–103); Los Angeles County, California, United States
- Burial place: Oakwood Cemetery, Corsicana, Texas
- Education: Art Students League of New York
- Occupation: Painter
- Parents: Eldred J. Simkins (father); Eliza Trescott (mother)

Martha E. Simkins (1866–1969) was an American painter, based in Texas, known for her depictions of interiors with figures, still lifes and portraits. She has been called a late-Impressionist-influenced artist.

== Biography ==
Simkins was born in 1866 in Monticello, Florida, United States, to Eliza Trescott (perhaps Prescott) and Judge Eldred J. Simkins. In 1871, the family moved to Corsicana, Texas.

=== Training ===
Around 1893, Simkins travelled to Manhattan with her mother and three siblings so she could enroll at the Art Students League of New York. There she studied with several influential and highly regarded American Impressionist painters including Kenyon Cox, Emil Carlsen and William Merritt Chase. By 1901, she had moved back to Texas to teach art at North Texas Normal School in Denton and stayed there for several years.

By 1906, she had returned to New York City so she could study again with William Merritt Chase.

From about 1906 to 1915, Simkins pursued her art in Europe where she befriended Mary Cassatt and may have studied with her. She also met the American painter John Singer Sargent as his influence can "clearly be seen in her work," though no evidence of formal instruction with either artist has been identified.

She told her good friend, Roger Saunders, that she had been taught by them [Cassatt and Sargent], although no documented materials connected to them have been located and neither artist is known to have taken on students.

From 1915 to 1924, Simkins was spending her winters in Dallas and summers at the Woodstock Art Colony in Woodstock, New York, keeping art studios in both locations and exhibiting her work in New York city. In 1925, with higher demand for her portraits, she stayed in the Northeast year round and decided to spend her winters in New York and return to Woodstock each summer. Over the years, her work appeared on exhibit at the Corcoran Gallery, the National Academy of Design and the Paris Salon.

Simkins moved back to Texas permanently in 1934, where she was given more portrait commissions, taught art students, including James Brooks, and entered her work in exhibitions there.

=== Later years ===
Simkins remained in Texas because of her mother's illness and other family obligations and continued to be an active artist in the Dallas area for most of the remainder of her long life. Simkins died at the age of 103, on April 15, 1969, in Los Angeles County, California. The artist is buried in Oakwood Cemetery, Corsicana, Texas.

== Selected exhibitions ==
- The Fort Worth Annual Exhibitions of Selected Paintings by Texas Artists in 1926-1928, 1930 and 1936
- The Klepper Club Exhibition in 1951
- "Martha Simkins Rediscovered" traveling exhibition in 2002 and 2003

== Memberships ==
- The Pen and Brush Club (1918), New York
- National Association of Women Painters and Sculptors
