= Magdalena Gómez =

American dramatist (1953-)

Magdalena Gómez (1953-) is an American playwright, poet, social activist, motivational speaker, and performer. She lives in Springfield, Massachusetts where she is the artistic director of Teatro V!da, the city's first Latin@ theatre, and served as the city's second Poet Laureate. Gómez has worked with young people through the arts for nearly forty years and focuses much of her work on intergenerational collaboration.

== Biography ==
Magdalena Gómez was born in 1953, in the Bronx, New York to a Spanish Gitano father and a Puerto Rican mother. Gómez's parents were not formally educated. Her father had only completed school to a second-grade level, but was fluent in three languages and proficient in five languages, Spanish, English, Basque, Italian, and Portuguese. Gomez's father immigrated to the United States through Ellis Island at the age of 17. Despite her parents' lack of formal education, Gómez displayed academic ability from an early age. As a young girl, Gómez discovered Chinese poetry and the works of Ralph Waldo Emerson and Robert Frost at the New York Public Library's Hunts Point branch in the South Bronx, which sparked her interest in poetry and writing. Gómez describes her interest in writing and academics as something she discovered independently, as her schools were "more like prisons than centers of learning."

== Career ==
Gómez began her career as a performance poet in 1971, when she first publicly performed her poetry at Dramatis Personae Theater, a burlesque house in Greenwich Village, at age 17. After this, she became involved in the New York City poetry scene, performing in cafes, bars, churches, theaters, and artists lofts. She lived for a time at the Pen and Brush Club, a professional organization that rented reasonably priced rooms in a Greenwich Village townhouse to women in the arts, where she was mentored by a local artist and educator, Linda Rapuano.

She studied English and Theater at Lehman College, as well as Spanish Literature at the University of Seville in Spain. In the 1970s, Gómez returned to New York City and taught drama at Johnny Colon's East Harlem Music School. She continued to perform poetry, finding a mentor in Emilie Glen, who held regular poetry salons in her living room. At these salons and other readings, she encountered many prominent members of the Nuyorican Movement, including Pedro Pietri, José Ángel Figueroa, Sandra María Esteves, and Judith Ortiz-Cofer. Though Gómez had been introduced to poetry through authors like Robert Frost and Ralph Waldo Emerson, she was later inspired to connect poetry with playwriting after exposure to the anti-fascist and anti-sexist plays of Federico García Lorca. In 1982, she became the first volunteer theater director at Teatro El Puente in Williamsburg, New York. During her time there, the company became an HIV/AIDS and health issue educational touring company.

In 1989, Gómez moved to Massachusetts, living in Hadley and Northampton before settling in Springfield with her partner, Jim Lescault. Gómez was also a teaching artist and mentor for the Women of Color Leadership Network at the University of Massachusetts, Amherst from 1995 to 2005. While at the University of Massachusetts, she developed the Writing from the Belly series, which would inspire a group of students to produce a show titled Body Politics, which would go on to become a yearly performance, inviting women of color from across the Five College community to participate. She is a former columnist for La Prensa de Western Massachusetts, the first bilingual regional newspaper in the area founded by Natalia Eugenia Muñoz, the granddaughter of Luis Muñoz Marín. Since 1999, she has been a teaching artist with SmART Schools Network. In 2007, Gómez co-founded Teatro V¡da, where she remains the artistic director. Within Teatro V¡da, she founded the Ferocious Women's Group, a multi-generational group dedicated to promoting the voices of girls and women through writing and performing arts, which meets regularly to provide mentorship and produce theater.

Gómez is also known for her work as a jazz poet. She traveled and performed with her performance partner, jazz saxophonist Fred Ho for over ten years.

From 2019 to 2022, Gómez served as the Poet Laureate of Springfield, Massachusetts, receiving a fellowship from the Academy of American Poets in 2021. As Poet Laureate, she collaborated with the Springfield Public Library and created the podcast, Jazz Ready: 15 Minutes (more or less) of Unexpected Pleasure. She also commentates for the New England Public Radio and writes a monthly column, Latino Groove, for the Springfield area newspaper, Point of View.

A collection of her papers is housed at the University of Connecticut Archives.

== Teatro V!da ==
Magdalena Gómez co-founded Teatro V!da, a performing arts collective that explores multicultural and multigenerational issues. Founded in 2007, Teatro V!da uses many modes of communication and production to reach over 250,000 audience members in the years since it began. The theatre holds an open-mic program called Ign!te the M!c, which is a venue run by youth and for youth. The theatre is in the process of creating a production that combines live music and dancing with poetry in partnership with the Ferocious Women's Group.

Teatro V!da uses the phrase "the other TV" to describe the theatre, reflecting the idea that through theatre, members can create their own reality, apart from what is portrayed by popular media. Youth development and youth leadership are central to the theatre's mission, with their mission statement reading, "We encourage youth to strive for excellence in all facets of their lives with a spirit of generosity, non-violence and compassion.” Through Teatro V!da, youth can build relationships with adult professionals for guidance in developing their own artistic pursuits and passions. Most of Teatro V!da's productions and events are generated directly by youth and incorporate multi-media production concepts.

== Professional works ==
Bullying: Replies, Rebuttals, Confessions, and Catharsis (2012) is a book co-edited by Gómez and María Luisa Arroyo that incorporates real stories from educators and students about their experiences with bullying. The collection of writings seeks to act as a method of healing for those impacted by bullying through the cathartic power of writing. The idea for the book resulted from the suicide of an 11-year-old boy who was the victim of bullying in Springfield.

Dancing in My Cockroach Killers (2013) is a performing arts piece consisting of a collection of Gómez's poems and monologues set to music by composer Desmar Guevara.

Shameless Woman (2014) is a memoir in poems written by Gómez. The poetry included in the book was composed over several decades, from the 1970s to the time the book was published. The book is divided into six sections: Shameless Woman, Family, To the Essence, The Invention of War, Lessons from the Dream World, and Endangered Species.

Language of Stars is a play written by Gómez starring a homeless man as the protagonist. The play won a Met-Life award from Repertorio Español in New York City.

In 2022, Gómez published Mi'ja, a memoir chronicling the first nineteen years of her life.

== Awards and recognition ==
- Poet Laureate of Springfield, MA – 2019–2021
- Latinas 50 Plus Literature Award, Fordham University - 2019
- Latinx Excellence on the Hill Award, Black and Latino Legislative Caucus of MA State House – 2019
- Excellence in the Arts Award, Springfield Cultural Council, Springfield, MA – 2018
- Arts and Humanities Award, New England Public Radio – 2018

== See also ==
- Latino theater in the United States
- Puerto Rican literature
