= Helen Hamlin =

American author

- Born: Helen Leidy; June 26, 1917; Fort Kent, Maine
- Other names: Helen Leidy Hamlin; Mrs. Willis Hamlin; Helen Lennon; Helen Hamlin Lennon; Mrs. Robert Earl Lennon

Helen Hamlin (1917–2004) was an American author who is known for her two books on life in northern Maine.

== Biography ==
Helen Austin Leidy was born in Fort Kent, Maine and grew up in Aroostook County, Maine. In 1937 she graduated from the Madawaska Training School, later a part of the University of Maine at Fort Kent. Her father and grandfather were Maine fish and game wardens. She met her first husband Willis ('Curly') Hamlin, also a game warden, at a dance while she was teaching at Churchill Lake. Being a speaker of both French and English helped in her teaching job since she had students in Churchill Lake who only spoke French.

Her first book, Nine Mile Bridge: Three Years in the Maine Woods, described her first years living in the woods with Curly Hamlin in the area known as St. John Valley. The book became a best seller in 1945 and was reprinted in 1973 and 2005. The book also became the basis for later discussions about living in the Maine woods. Hamlin's second book was about tales from Aroostook county and the news covered the process she used to gather information for this book. The book was titled Pine, Potatoes, and People and was published in 1948.

In 1947 she married Robert Lennon, who worked at the United States' Department of Fish and Wildlife. She moved to Michigan in the 1950s, where she painted portraits that appeared in shows in Washington, D.C. She later moved to Wisconsin where she obtained a teaching degree from the University of Wisconsin at La Crosse in 1961. In Wisconsin she taught French at Central High School in La Crosse, and at Wisconsin State in La Crosse. She also traveled, and worked for the United States' State Department as a translator in Africa. She died in Minnesota in 2004.

== Books ==
- Hamlin, Helen (2005). Nine Mile Bridge : three years in the Maine woods (3rd ed.). Yarmouth, Me.: Islandport Press, Inc. ISBN 0-9671662-5-X. OCLC 61677740.
- Hamlin, Helen (1948-01-01). Pine, Potatoes and People: The Story of Aroostook (1st ed.). W. W. Norton & Company.

== Awards and honors ==
In 1946, Hamlin was named to the Pen and Brush Club, a group founded in 1863 to recognize women writers and artists. In 1988 she was named an outstanding alumnus of the University of Maine at Fort Kent.
