= Adele Watson =

American artist (1873–1947)

- Born: April 30, 1873; Toledo, Ohio
- Died: March 23, 1947 (aged 73); Pasadena, California
- Known for: Painting, Lithography
- Notable work: Untitled (Mountain Island Monk); Untitled (Figure Floating on Lake); Lithographs
- Style: Landscape, Symbolist
- Movement: Modernism

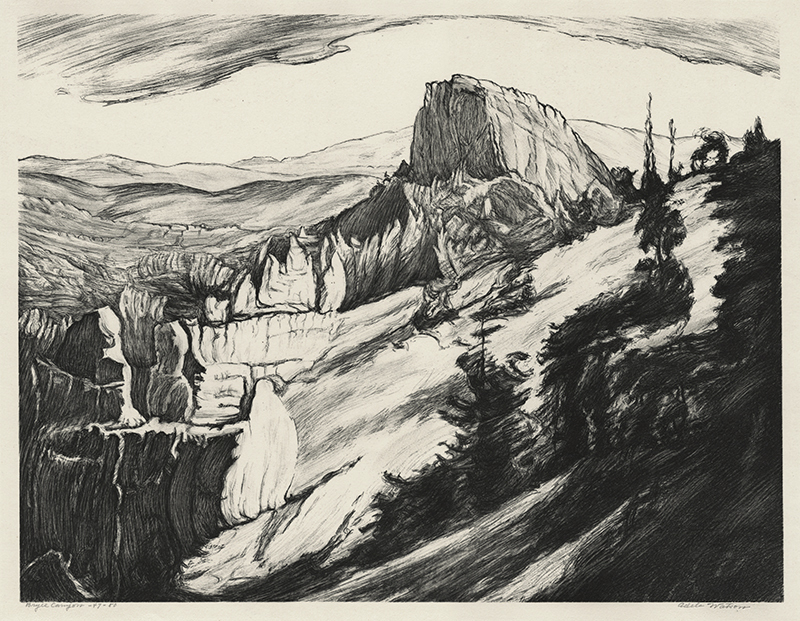
Bryce Canyon c. 1930

Fanny Adele Watson (April 30, 1873 – March 23, 1947) was an American painter and lithographer. She lived and worked for much of her life in Pasadena, California. Her work is best known for its spectral female figures and anthropomorphic landscapes.

== Life and career ==
Watson was born on April 30, 1873, in Toledo, Ohio. Her family moved to Pasadena in 1880, after the death of her father. As a young adult, Watson studied at the Art Students League of New York before returning to California in 1917. She also traveled to Paris and became a pupil of Raphael Collin.

Throughout her life, Watson was interested in the spiritual dimension of nature and the beauty of the natural world, a subject that also greatly interested the poet and artist Kahlil Gibran, with whom she became friends. Gibran drew a portrait of her in graphite in 1926.

Watson's first public exhibition was in 1913. Her first New York solo exhibition was held in 1916 at the Folsom Galleries and was reviewed as having "joy, freedom, vitality and abounding sense of rhythm." She exhibited with and was a member of the American Artists Professional League, the Pen and Brush Club, and the Society of Independent Artists; she also exhibited work at the National Academy of Design, among other places.

She died in Pasadena on March 23, 1947.

== Work and legacy ==
=== Art and influences ===
Taking inspiration from some of Arthur B. Davies's quasi-symbolist paintings (e.g., A Measure of Dreams), Watson's early work is frequently characterized by otherworldly nude female figures set in natural landscapes. Beginning around the 1930s, her later paintings and lithographs began to blend landscape and the human form together, so that anthropomorphic figures seem to emerge from dreamlike terrain. This shift in Watson's work occurred predominantly in response to her experience of the landscapes of Zion National Park and Bryce Canyon National Park. She made several similar coastal scenes as well, some of which depict the coast of Maine.

=== Critical reception ===
Contemporaneous reviews of Watson's art were often positive. Reviewing an exhibition of Watson's work in 1918, an article in American Art News describes "unworldly beings" in her paintings that imbue them with a "spiritual impulse;" the article goes on to praise Watson's "dramatic, epic and pageant sense for conveying her thoughts through her work." A 1924 article in The Art News describes a San Diego exhibition of "sixteen canvases of mystical subjects," which it characterizes as "very low tone and beautiful in color."

Arthur Millier, writing for the Los Angeles Times in 1933 about Watson's exhibit of paintings and painted screens, suggests that "Miss Watson sees landscape in terms of the soul of man." Millier notes that "this is her first Los Angeles showing of her works which have gained favor in the East."

=== Posthumous exhibitions and collections ===
In 1953, the Pasadena Art Institute held a retrospective of Watson's work; and again, in 1963, the Pasadena Art Institute held a memorial exhibition of her work. Some of Watson's lithographs were included in a 2021 show at the Ogunquit Museum of American Art titled Remember the Ladies: Women Painters in Ogunquit, 1900–1950. Watson's work was also included in the 2022–2023 exhibit, At the Dawn of a New Age: Early Twentieth-Century American Modernism, at the Whitney Museum of American Art, which holds two of her paintings in its permanent collection. Her work is also held in the collections of the Orange County Museum of Art and the Philadelphia Museum of Art.

== Note ==
There was another Adele Watson, who was a contemporary actress: Adele Watson (1890–1933) from Minnesota starred in over 20 films in the 1920s–1930s.
