= Mabel Hewit =

American woodblock printmaker (1903–1984)

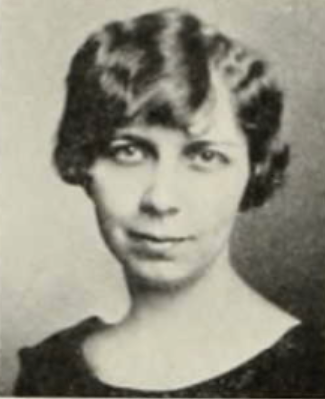
- Mabel A. Hewitt, Ohio State University Yearbook, 1926
- Born: 1903; Conneaut, Ohio
- Died: 1984 (aged 80–81)
- Education: Ohio State University; Teachers College, Columbia University
- Known for: White-line woodblock prints

Mabel Hewit (1903–1984) was an American woodblock print artist, particularly the white-line style of the Provincetown Printers.

== Early life and education ==
Mabel Amelia Hewit was born in 1903 in Conneaut, Ohio, and was raised in Youngstown, where she graduated in 1921 from South High School. She attended Ohio State University, and graduated with a bachelor's degree in 1926. While there, she was a member of the Pen and Brush Club, Panhellenic Council, Zeta Tau Alpha, and Kappa Phi. She also was on the staff of ‘’Phoenix’’.

She then taught in Detroit and Youngstown's public schools. In 1932, she received her master's degree from the Teachers College, Columbia University. While at Columbia, she took art classes from Blanche Lazzell, who created woodblock prints using the white-line technique, at her studio at Provincetown, Massachusetts. She also took art lessons at the Summer School of Painting at Saugatuck, Michigan over sixteen summers.

== Career ==
External images
- Janitzio, 1954
- Several works by Hewit
- Slideshow, Cleveland Art Museum

During the Great Depression, in 1934, she moved to Cleveland with her sister, Ednah Jurey, a weaver and certified public accountant, and lived there and then Parma for the rest of her life. She had a studio in Cleveland.

Mabel Hewit, Artists Working, ca. 1938

Hewit made prints of city and small-town life from that time. Using the white-line woodblock technique, she created prints of women sunbathing at the beach, The Ball Game (1934), factories, and neighbors with gable-roofed house that reflect her interest in modernism in the slightly abstract forms. Her works reflect influence of 19th-century Japanese ukiyo-e woodblock prints, her study with Lazzell, and French works, like that of Paul Gauguin and Maurice Denis. She said that she liked "block printing because it gives the family of moderate means an opportunity to have something of color and art in their homes."

In 1946, she captured an outdoor scene of a couple playing chess in Summer Chess. She made Janitzio of an island of a Mexican lake in 1954 that "says 'early paradise' with extreme economy. She also made prints on fabric. She made watercolor paintings, lithograph prints, enamels on metal, and ceramics. Her enamel works, which were in the collection of the Cleveland Museum of Art, were exhibited in 1949.

She died in 1984. An exhibit of her work was held in 2010 at the Cleveland Museum of Art, with an accompanying book for the show, Midwest Modern: The Color Woodcuts of Mabel Hewit.
