= Charles Webster Hawthorne =

American painter

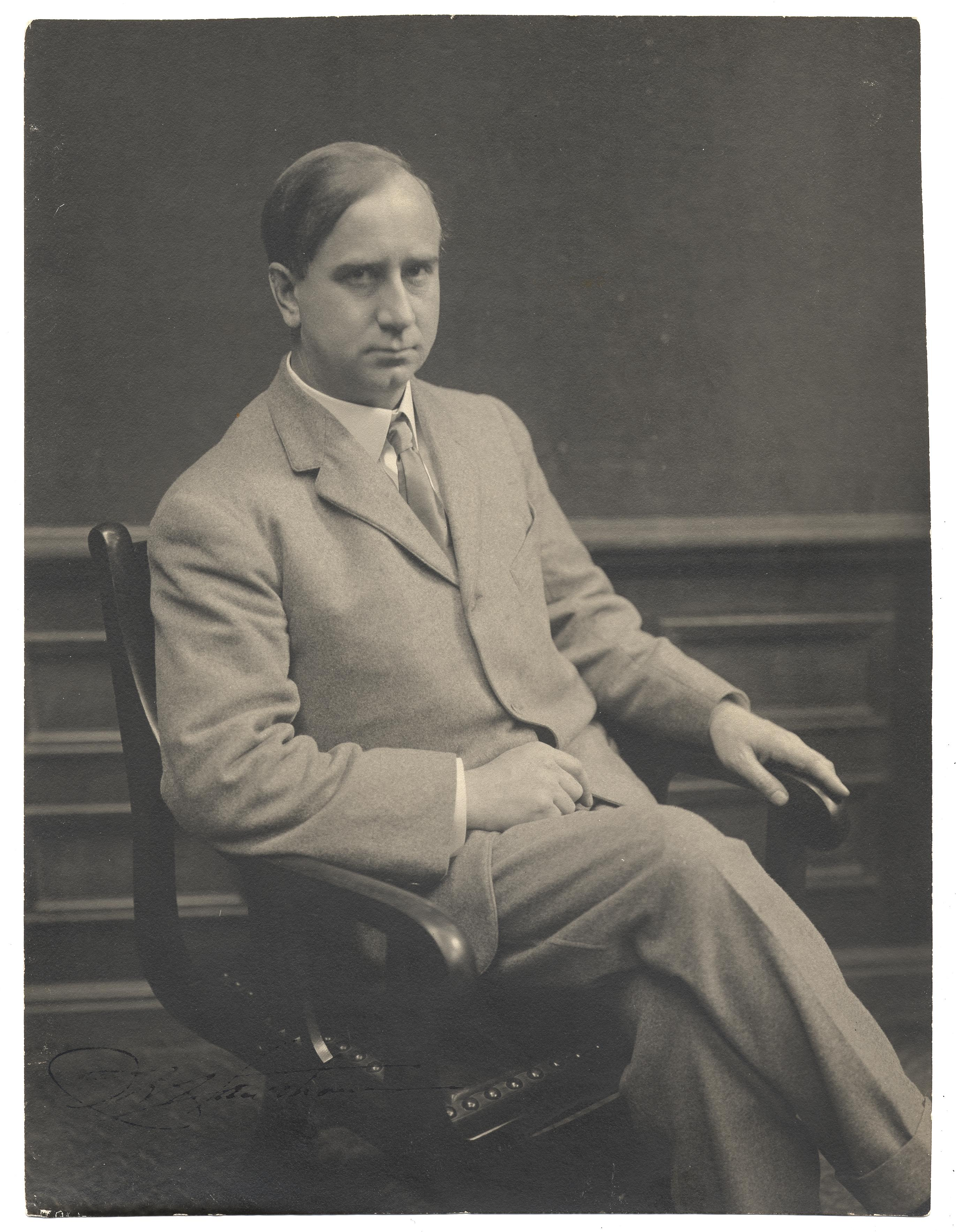
- Born: January 8, 1872; Lodi, Illinois, U.S.
- Died: November 29, 1930 (aged 58)
- Education: National Academy of Design and the Art Students League
- Occupation: Artist

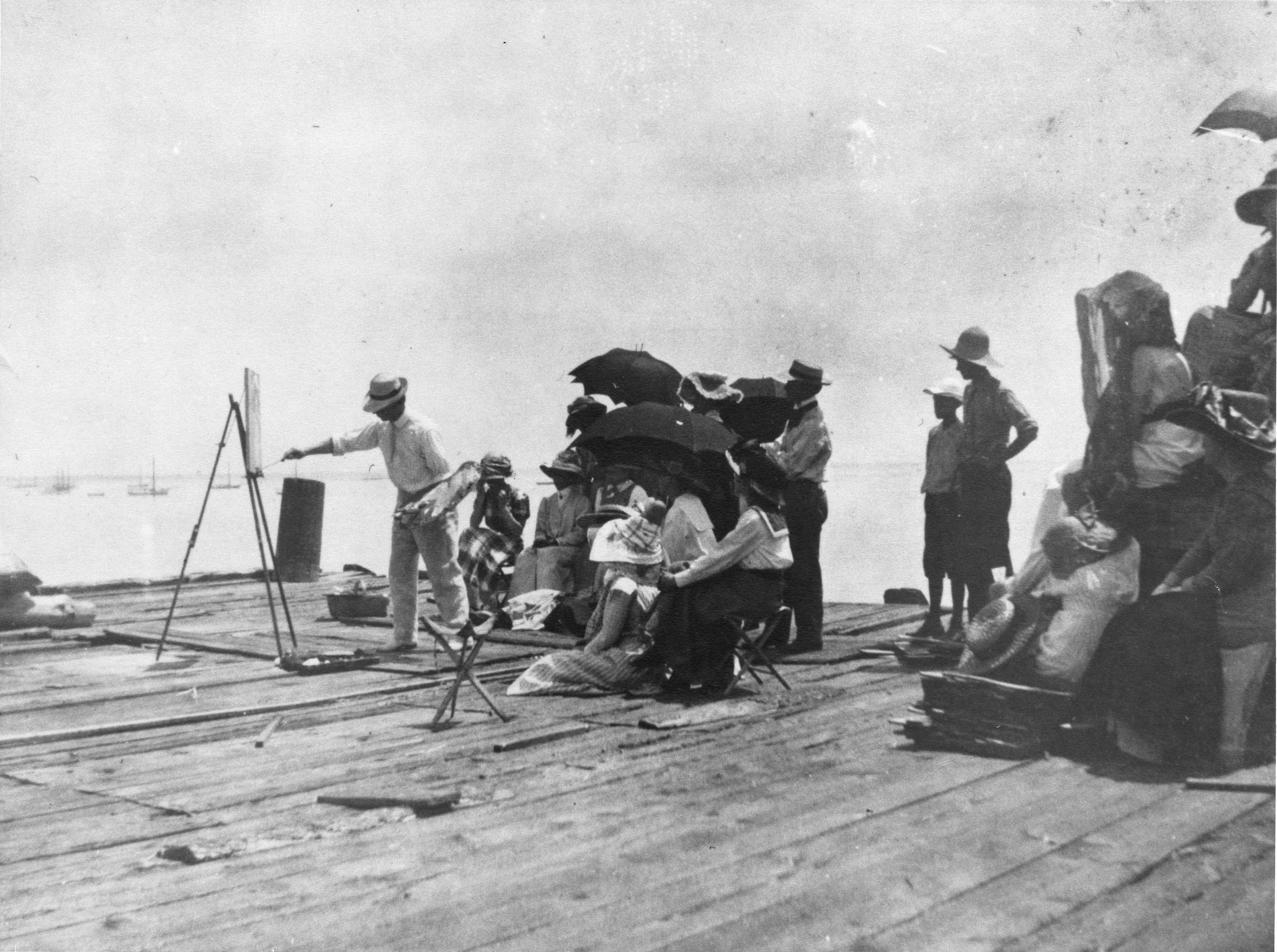
Webster (left) teaches an outdoor class, 1910

Charles Webster Hawthorne (January 8, 1872 – November 29, 1930) was an American portrait and genre painter and a noted teacher who founded the Cape Cod School of Art in 1899.

He was born in Lodi, Illinois, and his parents returned to Maine, raising him in the state where Charles' father was born. At age 18, he went to New York, working as an office-boy by day in a stained-glass factory and studying at night school and with Henry Siddons Mowbray and William Merritt Chase, and abroad in both the Netherlands and Italy. In 1908 he was elected into the National Academy of Design as an Associate member and became a full Academician in 1911.

[He studied painting under several notable artists] at the National Academy of Design and the Art Students League. Among his teachers were Frank Vincent DuMond and George de Forest Brush. But Hawthorne declared that the most dominant influence in his career was William Merritt Chase, with whom he worked as both a pupil and assistant. Both men were naturally talented teachers and figurative painters who were drawn to rich color and the lusciousness of oil paint as a medium. Chase passed on a Munich tradition of tone values and tone painting, and Hawthorne learned all he could.

While studying abroad in the Netherlands as Chase's assistant, Hawthorne was influenced to start his own school of art.

His winters were spent in Paris and New York City, his summers at Provincetown, Massachusetts, the site of his school. In addition to founding the Cape Cod School of Art, Hawthorne was also a founding member of the Provincetown Art Association established in 1914. While in Paris Hawthorne became a full member of the French Société Nationale des Beaux-Arts in 1917.

The Cape Cod School of Art was the first outdoor summer school for figure painting and grew into one of the nation's leading art schools. Under thirty years of Hawthorne's guidance, the school attracted some of the most talented art instructors and students in the country including John Noble, Richard Miller, and Max Bohm. At his school, Hawthorne gave weekly criticisms and instructive talks, guiding his pupils and setting up ideals but never imposing his own technique or method.

Another well known student was Norman Rockwell, who studied with Hawthorne one summer while he was enrolled at the Art Students League. William H. Johnson also studied with Hawthorne and later got a grant from him. Another pupil was Bertha Noyes, long an important figure in the artistic scene of Washington, D.C.

Among his works:

- The Trousseau, Metropolitan Museum of Art
- Mother and Child, Syracuse Museum
- Net Mender, Rhode Island School of Design, Providence
- Venetian Girl, Worcester Art Museum
- The Family, Buffalo Fine Arts Academy
- Crew of the Philomena Manta, 1915, Provincetown Art Collection.
- Fish Cleaners, Provincetown Art Collection
- Untitled (Study of girl in white) 1927, Provincetown Art Collection
- Girl in Yellow Scarf, 1904, Butler Institute of American Art, Youngstown, Ohio
- The Fisherman's Daughter, Corcoran Gallery of Art, Washington, D.C.
- The Fish and the Man, 1925 Dallas Museum of Art, Dallas, Texas

His class studio in Provincetown on Miller Hill Road (currently known as the Hawthorne School of Art) was added August 21, 1978, to the National Register of Historic Places. His wife was the painter Marion Campbell Hawthorne; their son, Joseph Hawthorne, was a successful orchestral conductor.

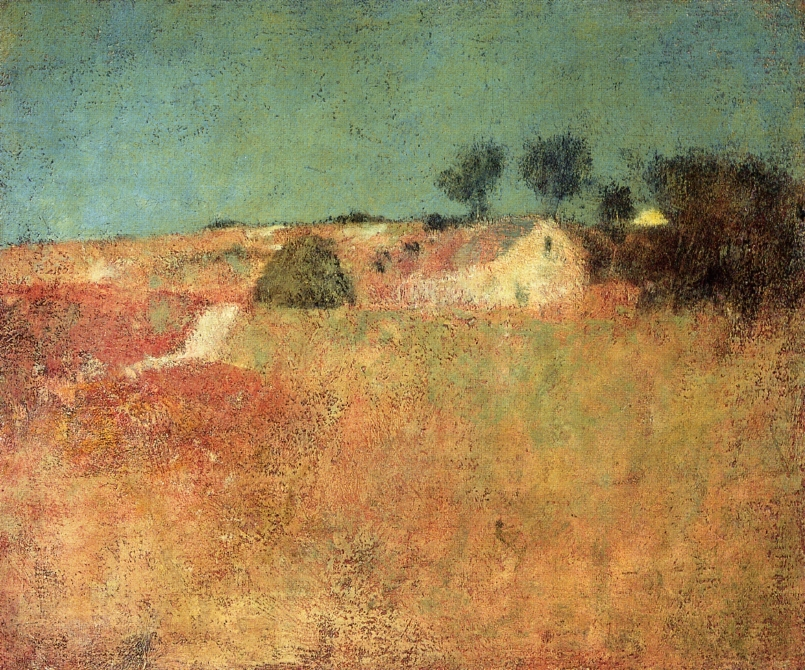
Green Sky Landscape, circa 1898

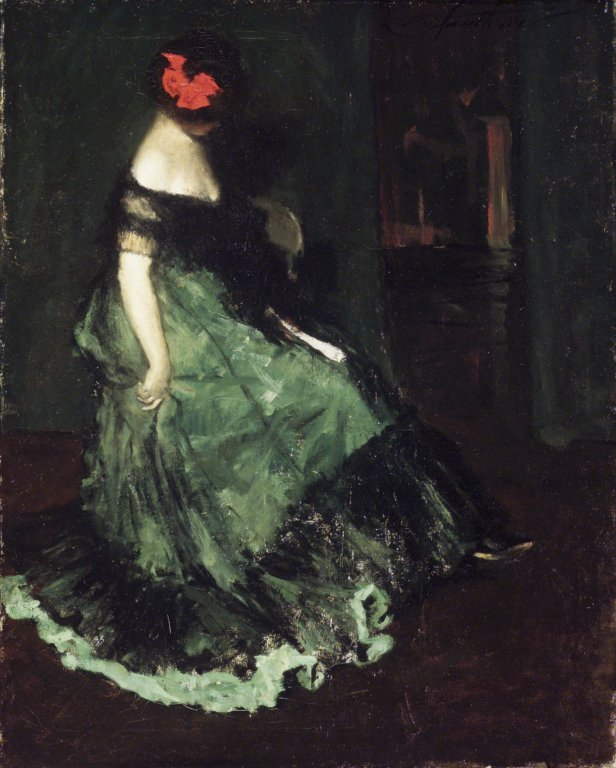
The Red Bow by Charles W. Hawthorne, circa 1902 Brooklyn Museum

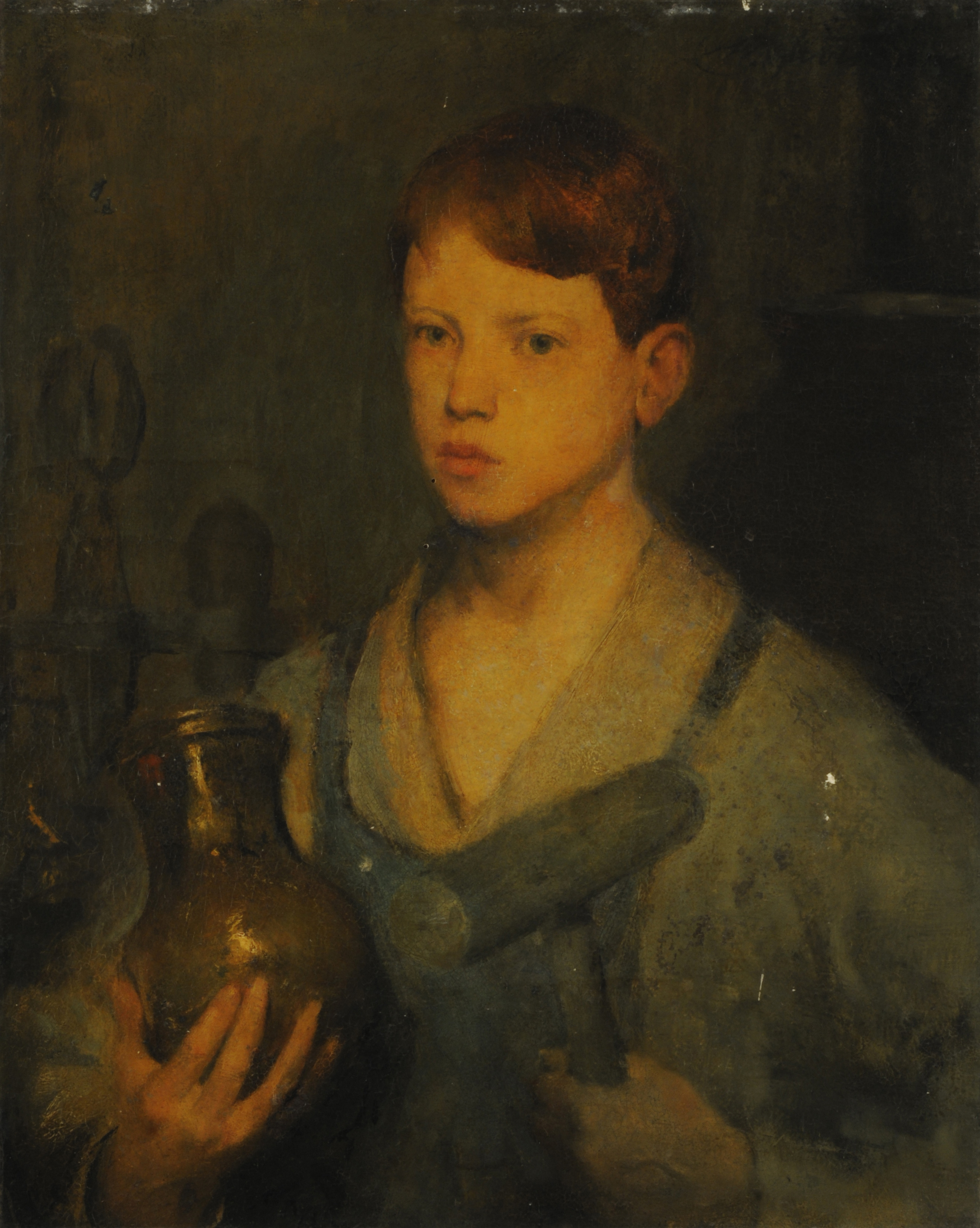
The apprentice - Charles Webster Hawthorne, circa 1907

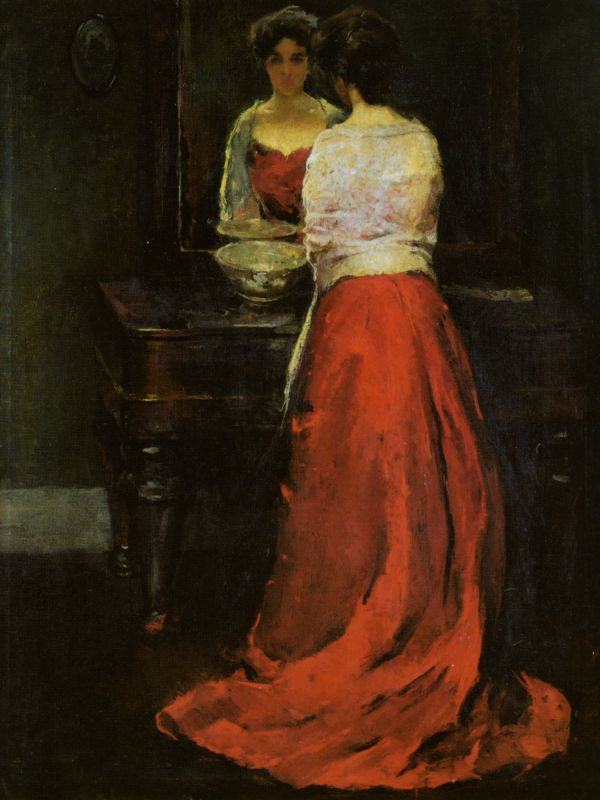
Lady in Red by artist Charles Webster Hawthorne, circa 1910
