= Pen and Brush Club =

Club in New York City

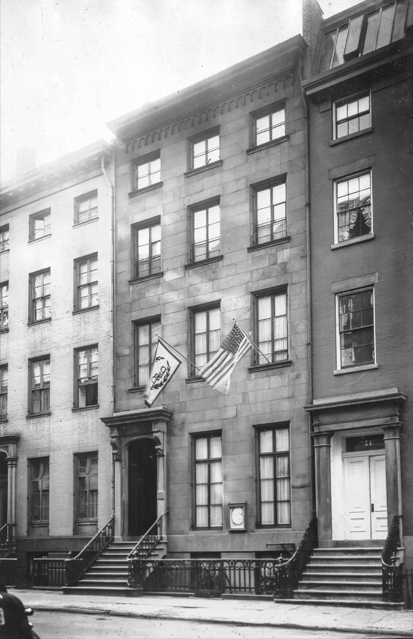
Pen and Brush Club, 10th Street, Manhattan (by Jessie Tarbox Beals c. 1923)

Pen and Brush Club (also known as Pen + Brush) is an international organization of professional women, writers and artists. Organized in 1897, the women formed themselves into a club of which the object was to be recreation and the promotion of social dialogue. An occasional afternoon "Shop Talk", for members only, affords opportunity for free helpful discussion of professional matters, and a tea is given on Tuesday of each week, to which members may invite their friends informally, while on the first Sunday of every month from October to May, a reception is held in honor of some guest of literary or artistic note. The original location was at 26 West Twenty-second Street, New York City.

The Pen and Brush Club operates as a publicly supported not-for-profit organization. In 2024, it claimed total revenue of $186,059, total expenses of $849,139, and total assets of $6,672,781.

== Notable people ==
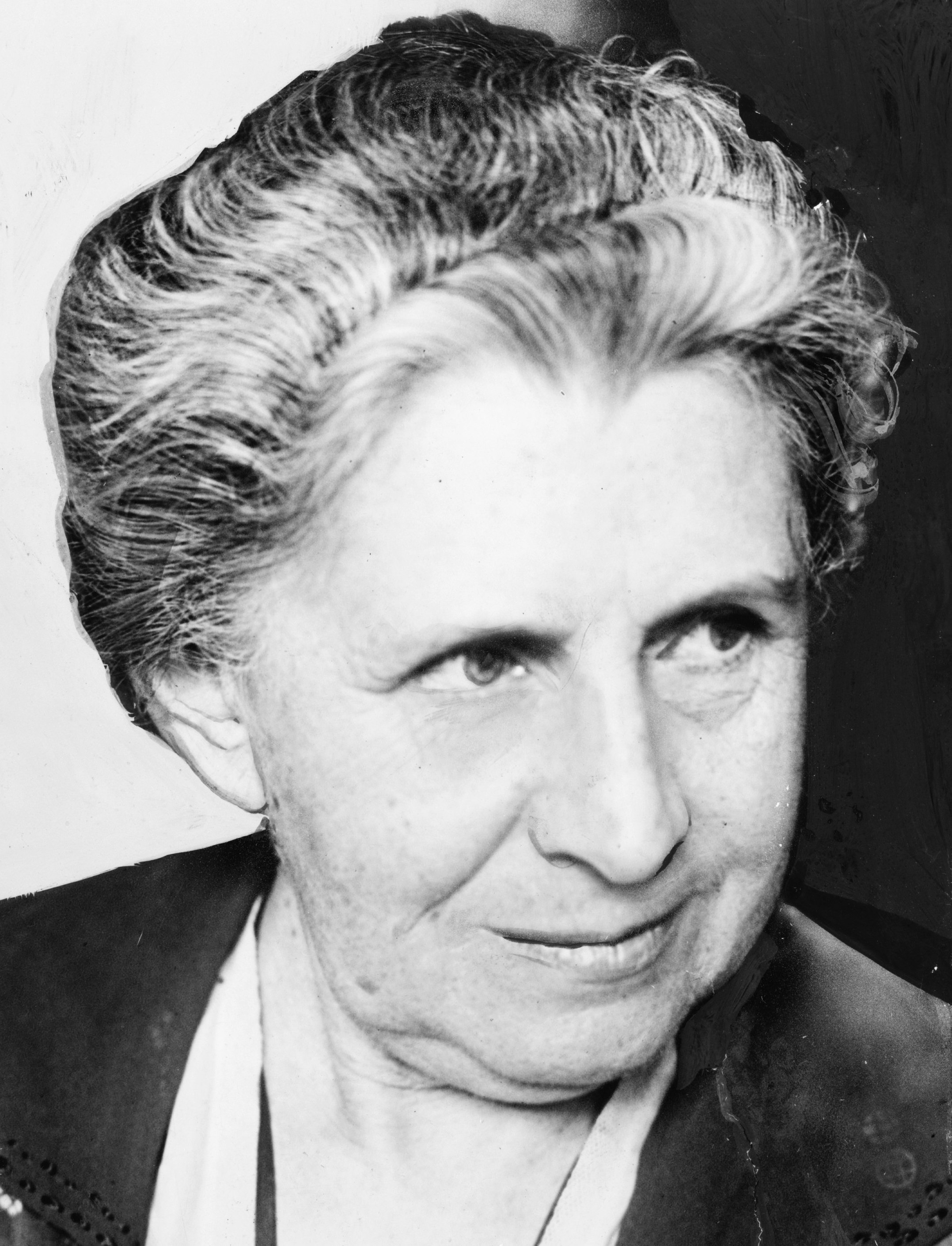
Ida Tarbell served as club president for 30 years.

- Rashidah Ismaili AbuBakr (1941–), poet and writer
- Louise Upton Brumback (1867–1929), artist and art activist
- Ida Josephine Burgess (1855–1934), artist
- Rose Woodallen Chapman (1875–1923), lecturer, author and editor
- Kate Cory (1861–1958), photographer and artist
- Lillian Cotton (1892–1962), painter
- Mabel Potter Daggett (1871–1927), writer, journalist, editor
- Scottie McKenzie Frasier (1884–1964), author, newspaper editor
- Emma Sheridan Fry (1864–1936), actress, playwright, and teacher
- Dorothy Giles (1892–1960), non-fiction author
- Magdalena Gómez (1953–), playwright, poet
- Helen Hamlin (1917–2004) was an American author
- Emily Nichols Hatch (1871–1959), painter
- Marion Campbell Hawthorne (1870–1945), painter
- Mabel Hewit (1903–1984), woodblock print artist
- Nell Choate Jones (1879–1981), artist
- Janet Cook Lewis (1855–1947), portrait painter, librarian, and bookbinder
- Betty Waldo Parish (1910–1986), printmaker and painter
- Alethea Hill Platt (1860–1932), artist and educator
- Emily Maria Scott (1832–1915), artist
- Martha Simkins (1866–1969), painter
- Jeanie Oliver Davidson Smith (1836–1925), poet and romancist
- Ida Tarbell (1857–1944), writer, investigative journalist, biographer
- Adele Watson (1873–1947), painter and lithographer
