= Ida Josephine Burgess =

American artist (1855–1934)

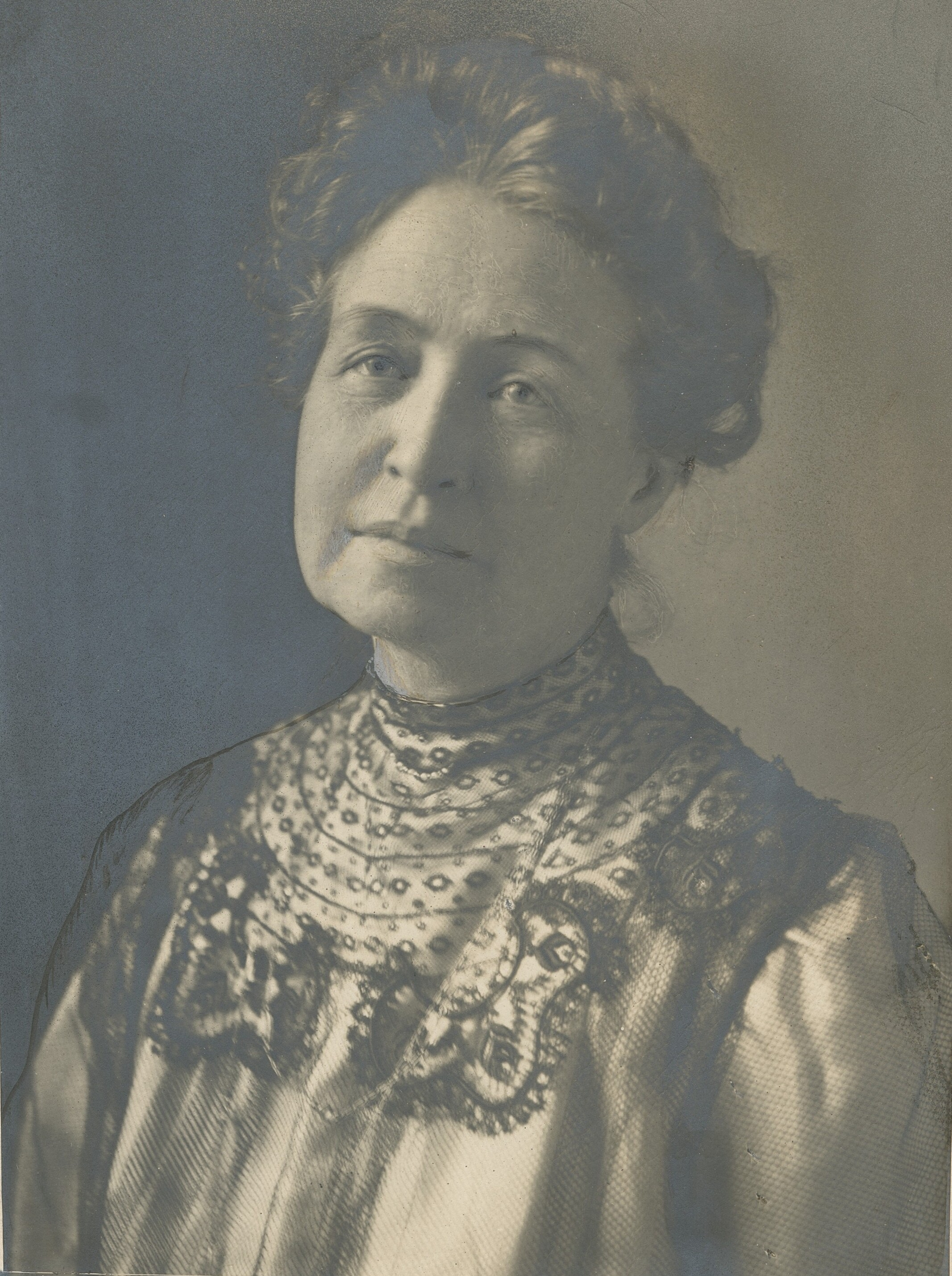
- Born: January 5, 1855; Chicago, Illinois
- Died: 1934 (aged 78–79); New York, New York
- Known for: Painting

Ida Josephine Burgess (January 5, 1855 – 1934) was an American artist known for her paintings, murals, and stained glass.

== Biography ==
Burgess was born on January 5, 1855, in Chicago, Illinois. She studied at Cooper Union and the Art Students League of New York where her teachers included Walter Shirlaw and William Merritt Chase. She continued her studies in France, eventually exhibiting at the Paris Salon in 1885.

Burgess exhibited her art in the Illinois State Building at the 1893 World's Columbian Exposition in Chicago, Illinois, including the mural for the women's reception room of the Illinois State Building. She subsequently decorated parts of Lunt Hall Library (now the Department of Mathematics building) at Northwestern University, specifically the entrance hall, the book room, and the reading room.

She exhibited her art at the Art Institute of Chicago from 1892 through 1903. She was a member of the Chicago Society of Artists, the New York Women's Art Club, the National Association of Women Artists, Painters, Sculptors, and the Pen and Brush Club, New York.

She died in July 1934 in New York City.

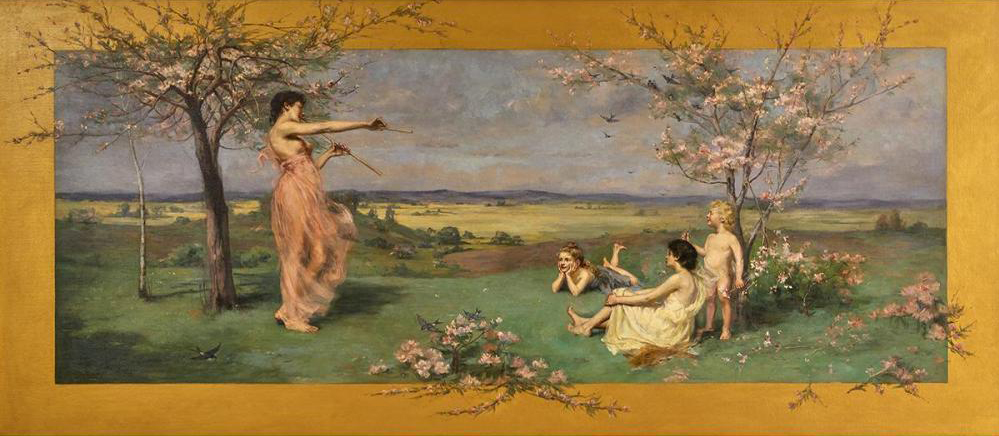
Song of Spring by Ida Josephine Burgess, 1891
