= Emily Nichols Hatch =

American artist

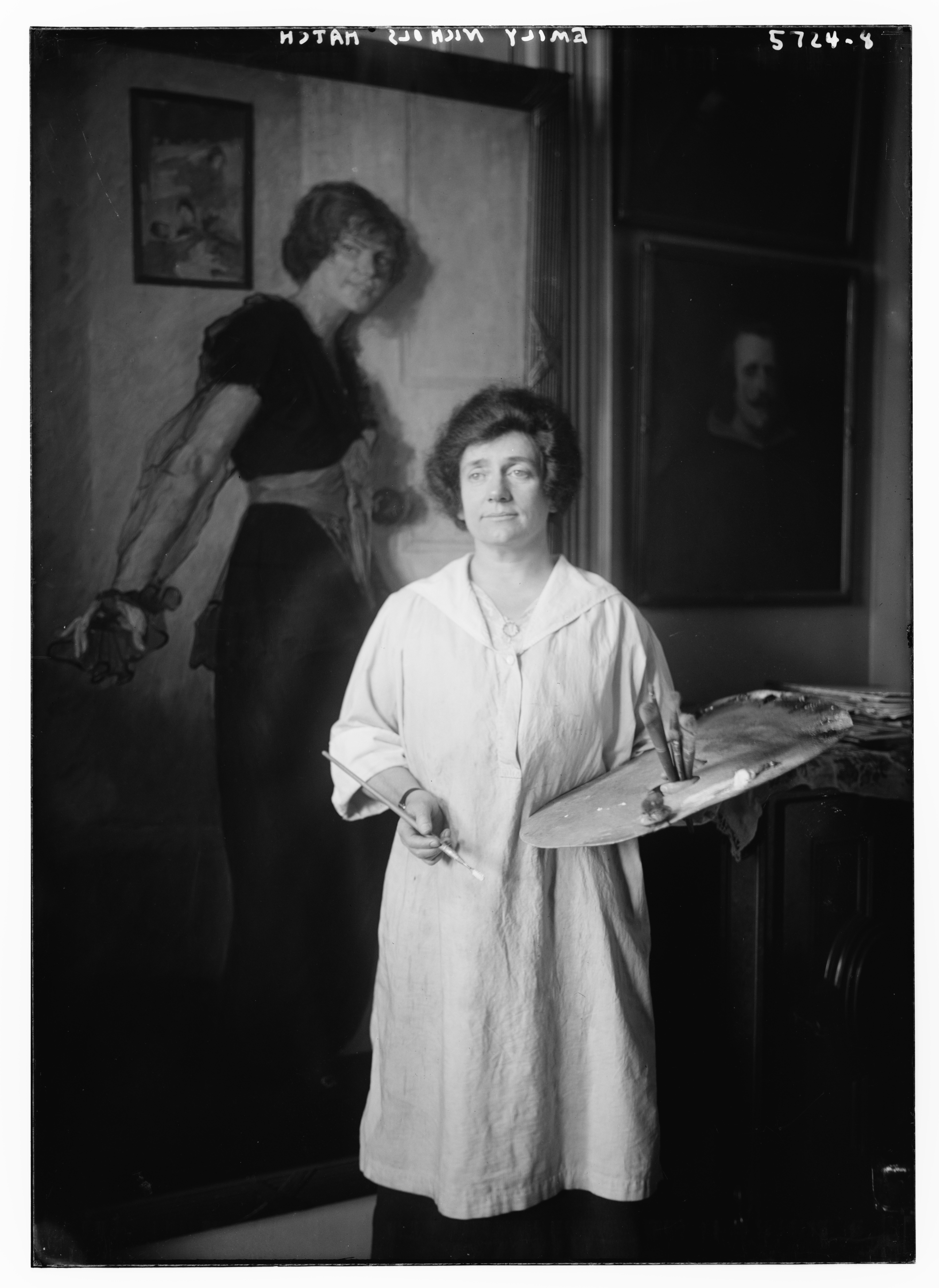
- Born: 1871; Newport, Rhode Island
- Died: 1959 (aged 87–88)
- Known for: Painting

Emily Nichols Hatch (1871- 1959) was an American painter known for her portraits and landscapes.

== Biography ==
Hatch was born in 1871 in Newport, Rhode Island. She studied at the Artists and Artisans Institute, and the Shinnecock Hills Summer School of Art. In 1912 she was the recipient of the Macmillian portrait prize from the Woman's Art Club of New York. She was a member of the Pen and Brush Club, and the National Association of Women Painters and Sculptors, where she served as president from 1921 through 1925. In 1940 she became the director of the Art Center in Tarrytown, New York, Westchester County.

Hatch died 1959. Her papers are in the Archives of American Art at the Smithsonian Institution.
