= Rose Woodallen Chapman =

American lecturer, author and editor (1875–1923)

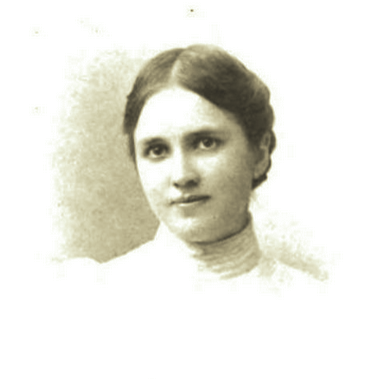
- Portrait photo from YWWCTU Almanac, 1902
- Born: Rose Maria Wood-Allen; 1875; Lakeside, Ohio. U.S.
- Died: October 27, 1923 (aged 47–48); New York City, U.S.
- Occupations: lecturer; writer; editor
- Notable work: The Moral Problem of the Children; Making the Best of Our Children; How Shall I Tell My Child?

Rose Woodallen Chapman (1875–1923) was an American lecturer, author and editor.

== Early life and education ==
Rose Maria Wood-Allen was born at Lakeside, Ohio near Toledo. She was the only daughter of Dr. Mary Wood-Allen.

Chapman attended various schools, including what became Lake Erie College, and the Ann Arbor High School, from which she graduated in 1895. The following fall, she entered the University of Michigan in 1895. Being unable, because of threatened poor-health, to finish the year's work, she accompanied her mother on a trip and made her first appearance on the lecture platform. She returned to the University of Michigan in 1898, and two years of studying followed.

== Career ==
When failing health on the part of her mother called Chapman back home, Chapman took up the duties of acting editor of the magazine owned and edited by her mother, then known as The New Crusade, still being published under the name of American Motherhood. With this, she remained associated both in the business management and editorially until her marriage, in 1902, to William Brewster Chapman, of Cleveland, Ohio.

For several years following this event, her home was in northern Michigan, from where she began to contribute to such periodicals as The Congregationalist, The Ladies' World, The Union Signal, The Christian Endeavor World, and others.

She served as Secretary of the White Shield Branch of the National Woman's Christian Temperance Union (WCTU) and began writing and lecturing the same year.

=== New York City ===
In 1905, New York City became her home and she at once joined the Woman's Press Club, Mother's Club, Woman's Forum, Pen and Brush Club, and the American Society of Sanitary and Moral Prophylaxis. She later became President of the Mother's Club.

In October 1907, she was appointed national superintendent of the Purity Department of the WCTU. In this capacity, she wrote a large number of articles and leaflets, including her book The Moral Problem of the Children.

In 1910, Chapman attended the World's WCTU convention in Glasgow, Scotland, and later in the year, was in Madrid as a delegate to the congress on the suppression of the white slave traffic. In the same year, she became editor of a department in the Ladies Home Journal, and was appointed associate superintendent of the Moral Educational Department of the WCTU. This position, however, together with her national superintendency she resigned in the spring of 1911 on account of threatened poor-health, and in order to devote herself more exclusively to her literary work.

In the summer of 1911, she had charge of the Woman's Purity Conferences of the International Christian Endeavor Convention, and the following winter, resigned her position in the National and World's WCTU in order to devote herself to writing.

In 1918, under the auspices of the Woman's War Service Bureau, she lectured on "Patriotic Womanhood". Through the War Work Council of the Young Women's Christian Association, Chapman's services were to visit cantonment cities all over the country.

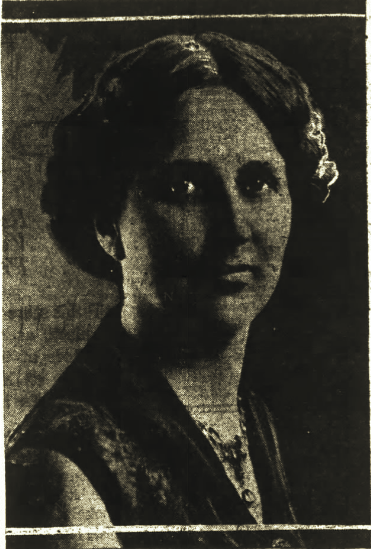
Portrait photo from The Atlanta Constitution, 1922

She served as chair of the committee of community service on motion pictures for the General Federation of Women's Clubs in 1922. She was a member of the Will H. Hays "committee of twenty," which included in its membership Mrs. Herbert H. Hoover, president of the Girl Scouts; Charles A. McMahon, editor, National Catholic Welfare Council Bulletin, and a group of civic leaders from throughout the U.S. In behalf of the movement to awaken public interest in the pictures being produced at that time, and in response to the demand for "better pictures", Chapman formed a council composed of the chairs of the fifteen largest organizations in the country.

== Personal life ==
In August 1905, (Note: According to The Michigan Alumnus, Volume 20, Bruce was born in 1903.) her only child, a son, Bruce Wood-Allen Chapman, was born.

Rose Woodallen Chapman died October 27, 1923, at the Hotel Woodward, New York City, after a long illness with persistent anemia.

== Selected works ==
=== Books ===
- The Moral Problem of the Children, 1909 (text)
- Making the Best of Our Children ..., Volume 1, 1909 (text)
- How Shall I Tell My Child?, 1912 (text)

=== Articles ===
- "The Superfluities of Life", Good Health, 1906
- "Things for the Cook, Sir", American Motherhood, 1907
- "The Problem of Goodness", American Motherhood, 1907
- "How New Thought Principles were Taught to a Child of Four", The Nautilus: Magazine of New Thought, 1907
- "Solving the Domestic Problem By New Thought Formulae", The Nautilus: Magazine of New Thought, 1907
- "All is Good", The Nautilus: Magazine of New Thought, 1907

== Filmography ==
- Scenario writer, Safeguarding the Nation
