= Raspail (disambiguation) =

François-Vincent Raspail (1794–1878) was a French politician and chemist.

Raspail may also refer to:

- Boulevard Raspail, a boulevard of Paris, France
- Raspail station, a Paris Metro station

== People with the surname ==
- Benjamin Raspail (1823–1899), French politician, son of François-Vincent Raspail
- Jean Raspail (1925–2020), French writer
