= Bert Yarborough =

American abstract painter, sculptor, and educator (born 1946)

- Born: November 30, 1946 (age 79); Miami, Florida, U.S.
- Education: Clemson University (BA); University of Iowa (MA, MFA)
- Known for: Painting, sculpture, printmaking
- Movement: Abstract expressionism, abstract art
- Awards: National Endowment for the Arts Fellowship (1980); Fulbright Fellowship (1984); Adolph and Esther Gottlieb Foundation Grant (2023)

Bert Yarborough (born November 30, 1946) is an American abstract painter, sculptor, and printmaker active in Truro, Massachusetts. His artistic practice combines gestural mark-making, medieval topographical imagery, and symbolic motifs informed by West African art. Yarborough held the Sonia C. Davidow '56 Endowed Chair in Fine and Performing Arts at Colby-Sawyer College and served in several leadership capacities at the Fine Arts Work Center (FAWC) in Provincetown, Massachusetts. His honors include grants and fellowships from the National Endowment for the Arts, the Fulbright Program, the Civitella Ranieri Foundation, and the Adolph and Esther Gottlieb Foundation.

== Early life and education ==
Yarborough was born and raised in Miami, Florida. He completed an undergraduate degree in architecture at Clemson University before redirecting his studies toward studio art at the University of Iowa, where he earned both a Master of Arts and a Master of Fine Arts in photography.

In 1976, he arrived on the Outer Cape as a two-year Visual Arts Fellow at FAWC. Yarborough remained closely affiliated with the organization in subsequent years, serving as its Visual Arts Program Coordinator for four years, heading its Visual Committee, and sitting on the Board of Trustees.

== Career ==
In 1980, Yarborough was awarded an Individual Artist Fellowship in sculpture from the National Endowment for the Arts. He traveled to Nigeria on a Fulbright Fellowship in sculpture in 1984 to study historical Yoruban woodcarving traditions. This research introduced a peaked architectural silhouette resembling a ritual shrine, which developed into a signature element throughout his mixed-media compositions and paintings. During three summer stays in the 1980s, Yarborough lived and worked in a dune shack, drawing on the natural coastal environment to cultivate the earth-derived palette and dynamic forms central to his work.

Yarborough joined the faculty of Colby-Sawyer College in New London, New Hampshire, in 1996, where he held the Sonia C. Davidow '56 Endowed Chair in Fine and Performing Arts. Along with teaching studio coursework in drawing and painting, he directed the college's Marian Graves Mugar and Davidow Art Galleries until his retirement as professor emeritus in 2018. In 2018, he was awarded a Visual Arts Fellowship at the Civitella Ranieri Center in Umbria, Italy, followed by an Individual Artist Support Grant from the Adolph and Esther Gottlieb Foundation in 2023. In late 2017, Yarborough consolidated more than four decades of work into an industrial studio space in Truro, Massachusetts.

== Style, exhibitions, and collections ==
Yarborough works across two- and three-dimensional media, producing work in acrylic, gouache, vinyl-based Flashe paint, ink, and monotype, as well as three-dimensional constructions made from recycled spun plastic. His compositions frequently contrast spontaneous, calligraphic gestures with geometric and spatial boundaries.

Between 2018 and 2023, he produced Index/Codex, an 80-part sequence executed on vintage index cards salvaged years earlier in Provincetown, which was later published as a collaborative artist book with Farm Projects. Yarborough's work has been presented in solo and group exhibitions nationally and abroad, including shows at the Provincetown Art Association and Museum, Berta Walker Gallery, and the 2025 Across Three Borders international printmaking exhibition in South Korea.

His work is held in permanent museum and public collections, including:

- Boston Public Library (Boston, MA)
- Currier Museum of Art (Manchester, NH)
- Hood Museum of Art, Dartmouth College (Hanover, NH)
- Herbert F. Johnson Museum of Art, Cornell University (Ithaca, NY)
- Nelson-Atkins Museum of Art (Kansas City, MO)
- Provincetown Art Association and Museum (Provincetown, MA)
