= Bastille Day =

French national day (14 July)

The Fourteenth of July
- Fireworks at the Eiffel Tower, Paris, 2017
- Also called: French National Day (Fête nationale)
- Observed by: France
- Type: National day
- Significance: Commemorates the Storming of the Bastille on 14 July 1789, and the unity of the French people at the Fête de la Fédération on 14 July 1790
- Celebrations: Military parades, fireworks, concerts, balls
- Date: 14 July
- Next time: 14 July 2027
- Frequency: Annual

Bastille Day is the common name given in English-speaking countries to the national day of France, which is celebrated on 14 July each year. It is referred to, both legally and commonly, as le 14 juillet (French: [lə katɔʁz(ə) ʒɥijɛ]) in French, though la fête nationale is also used in the press.

French National Day is the anniversary of the Storming of the Bastille on 14 July 1789, a major event of the French Revolution, as well as the Fête de la Fédération that celebrated the unity of the French people on 14 July 1790. Celebrations are held throughout France. One that has been reported as "the oldest and largest military parade in Europe" is held on 14 July on the Champs-Élysées in Paris in front of the President of France, along with other French officials and foreign guests.

== History ==
=== 1789: Storming of the Bastille ===
External videos
- Bastille Day 2023
- via YouTube
- Live: Cérémonie du 14 juillet 2023 (14 July 2023), by Élysée Palace (in French)

In 1789, tensions rose in France between reformist and conservative factions as the country struggled to resolve an economic crisis. In May, the Estates General legislative assembly was revived, but members of the Third Estate broke ranks, declaring themselves to be the National Assembly of the country, and on 20 June, vowed to write a constitution for the kingdom.

On 11 July, Jacques Necker, the finance minister of Louis XVI, who was sympathetic to the Third Estate, was dismissed by the King, provoking an angry reaction among Parisians. Crowds formed, fearful of an attack by the royal army or by foreign regiments of mercenaries in the King's service and seeking to arm themselves. Early on 14 July, a crowd besieged the Hôtel des Invalides for firearms, muskets, and cannons stored in its cellars. That same day, another crowd stormed the Bastille, a fortress-prison in Paris that had historically held people jailed on the basis of lettres de cachet (literally "signet letters"), arbitrary royal indictments that could not be appealed and did not indicate the reason for the imprisonment, and which was believed to hold a cache of ammunition and gunpowder. As it happened, at the time of the attack, the Bastille held only seven inmates, none of great political significance.

The crowd was eventually reinforced by the mutinous Régiment des Gardes Françaises ("Regiment of French Guards"), whose usual role was to protect public buildings. They proved a fair match for the fort's defenders, and Governor de Launay, the commander of the Bastille, capitulated and opened the gates to avoid a mutual massacre. According to the official documents, about 200 attackers and just one defender died before the capitulation. However, possibly because of a misunderstanding, fighting resumed. In this second round of fighting, de Launay and seven other defenders were killed, as was Jacques de Flesselles, the prévôt des marchands ("provost of the merchants"), the elected head of the city's guilds, who under the French monarchy had the responsibilities of a present-day mayor.

Shortly after the storming of the Bastille, late in the evening of 4 August, after a very stormy session of the Assemblée constituante, feudalism was abolished. On 26 August, the Declaration of the Rights of Man and of the Citizen (Déclaration des Droits de l'Homme et du Citoyen) was proclaimed.

=== 1790: Fête de la Fédération ===
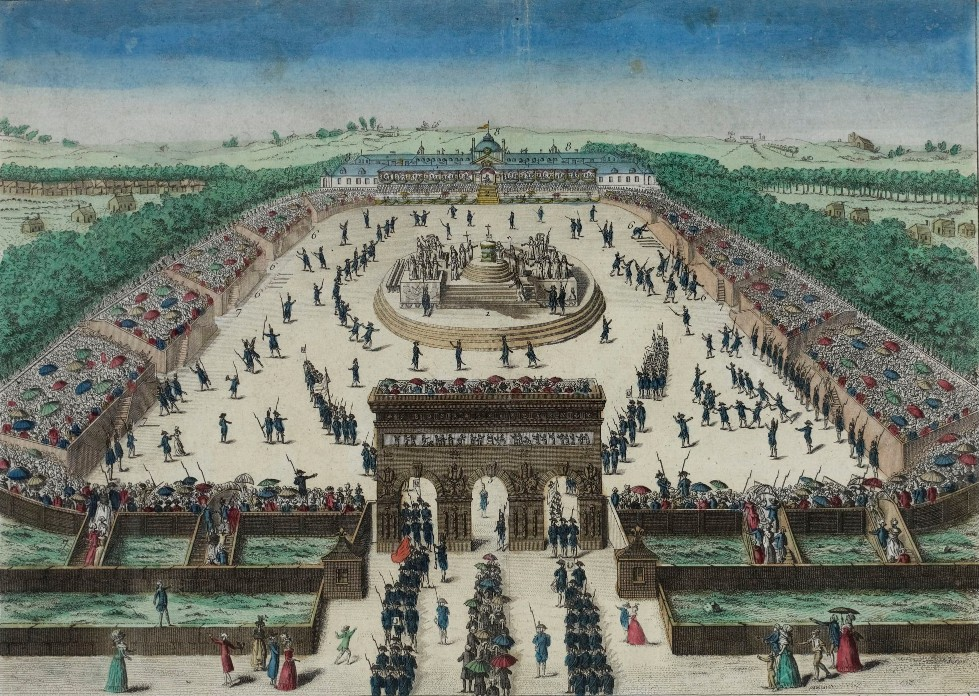
Fête de la Fédération, Musée de la Révolution française

As early as 1789, the year of the storming of the Bastille, preliminary designs for a national festival were underway. These designs were intended to strengthen the country's national identity through the celebration of the events of 14 July 1789. One of the first designs was proposed by Clément Gonchon, a French textile worker, who presented his design for a festival celebrating the anniversary of the storming of the Bastille to the French city administration and the public on 9 December 1789. There were other proposals and unofficial celebrations of 14 July 1789, but the official festival sponsored by the National Assembly was called the Fête de la Fédération.

The Fête de la Fédération on 14 July 1790 was a celebration of the unity of the French nation during the French Revolution. The aim of this celebration, one year after the Storming of the Bastille, was to symbolize peace. The event took place on the Champ de Mars, which was located far outside of Paris at the time. The work needed to transform the Champ de Mars into a suitable location for the celebration was not on schedule to be completed in time. On the day recalled as the Journée des brouettes ("The Day of the Wheelbarrow"), thousands of Parisian citizens gathered together to finish the construction needed for the celebration.

The day of the festival, the National Guard assembled and proceeded along the boulevard du Temple in the pouring rain, and were met by an estimated 260,000 Parisian citizens at the Champ de Mars. A mass was celebrated by Talleyrand, bishop of Autun. The popular General Lafayette, as captain of the National Guard of Paris and a confidant of the king, took his oath to the constitution, followed by King Louis XVI. After the end of the official celebration, the day ended in a huge four-day popular feast, and people celebrated with fireworks, as well as fine wine and running nude through the streets in order to display their freedom.

=== Origin of the current celebration ===
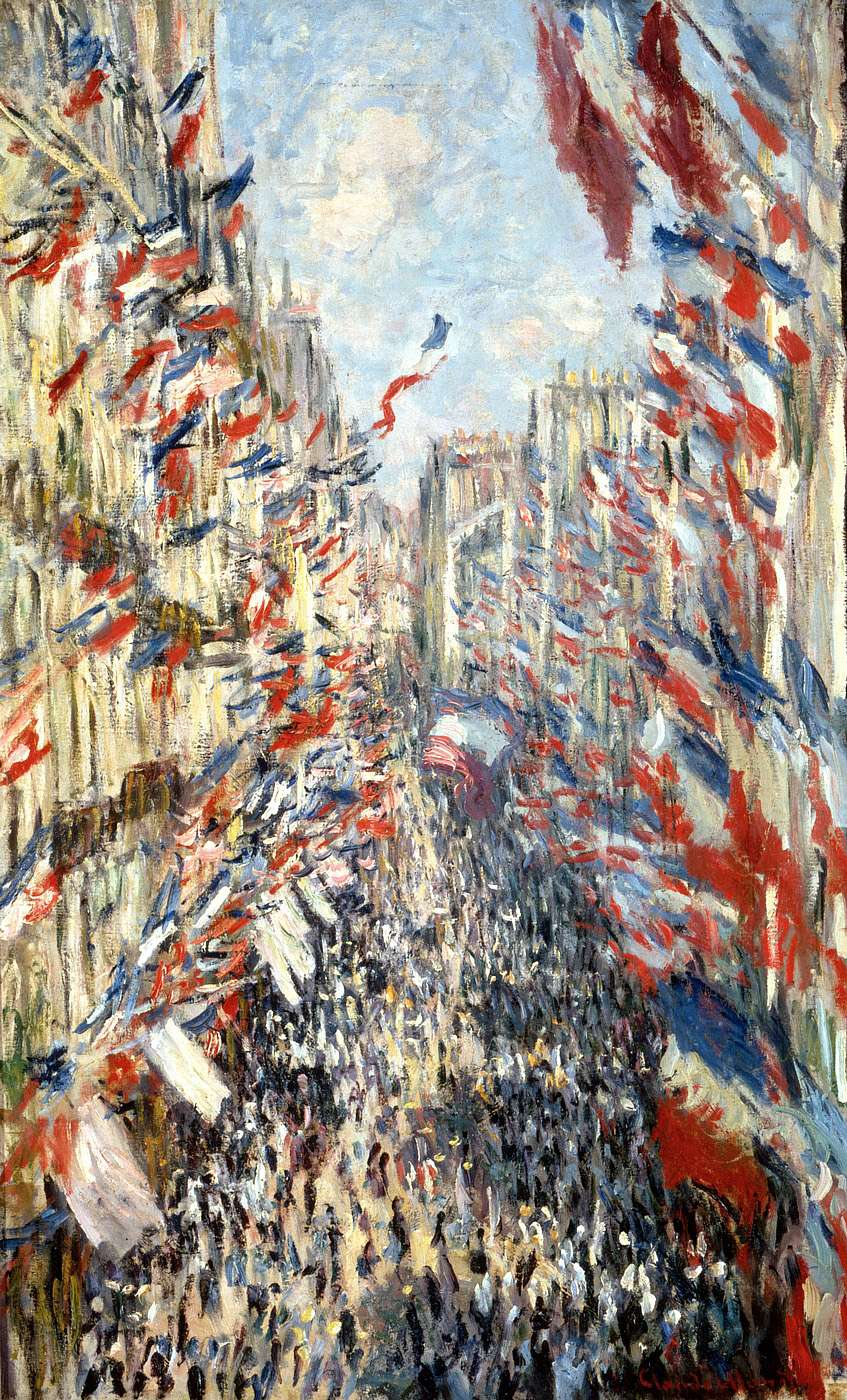
Claude Monet, Rue Montorgueil, Paris, Festival of 30 June 1878

On 30 June 1878, a feast was officially arranged in Paris to honour the French Republic (the event was commemorated in a painting by Claude Monet). On 14 July 1879, there was another feast, with a semi-official aspect. The day's events included a reception in the Chamber of Deputies, organised and presided over by Léon Gambetta (a military reviewer at Longchamp), and a Republican Feast in the Pré Catelan. All throughout France, Le Figaro wrote, "people feasted much to honour the storming of the Bastille".

In 1880, the government of the Third Republic wanted to revive the 14 July festival. The campaign for the reinstatement of the festival was sponsored by the notable politician Léon Gambetta and scholar Henri Baudrillant. On 21 May 1880, Benjamin Raspail proposed a law, signed by sixty-four members of government, to have "the Republic adopt 14 July as the day of an annual national festival". There were many disputes over which date to be remembered as the national holiday, including 4 August (the commemoration of the end of the feudal system), 5 May (when the Estates-General first assembled), 27 July (the fall of Robespierre), and 21 January (the date of Louis XVI's execution). The government decided that the date of the holiday would be 14 July, but that was still somewhat problematic. The events of 14 July 1789 were illegal under the previous government, which contradicted the Third Republic's need to establish legal legitimacy. French politicians also did not want the sole foundation of their national holiday to be rooted in a day of bloodshed and class-hatred as the day of storming the Bastille was. Instead, they based the establishment of the holiday as both the celebration of the Fête de la Fédération, a festival celebrating the anniversary of the Republic of France on 14 July 1789, and the storming of the Bastille. The Assembly voted in favor of the proposal on 21 May, and 8 June. The law was approved on 27 and 29 June. The celebration was made official on 6 July 1880.

In the debate leading up to the adoption of the holiday, Senator Henri Martin, who wrote the National Day law, addressed the chamber on 29 June 1880:

Do not forget that behind this 14 July, where victory of the new era over the Ancien Régime was bought by fighting, do not forget that after the day of 14 July 1789, there was the day of 14 July 1790 (...) This [latter] day cannot be blamed for having shed a drop of blood, for having divided the country. It was the consecration of the unity of France (...) If some of you might have scruples against the first 14 July, they certainly hold none against the second. Whatever difference which might part us, something hovers over them, it is the great images of national unity, which we all desire, for which we would all stand, willing to die if necessary.

— Henri Martin, 1880

=== Bastille Day military parade ===
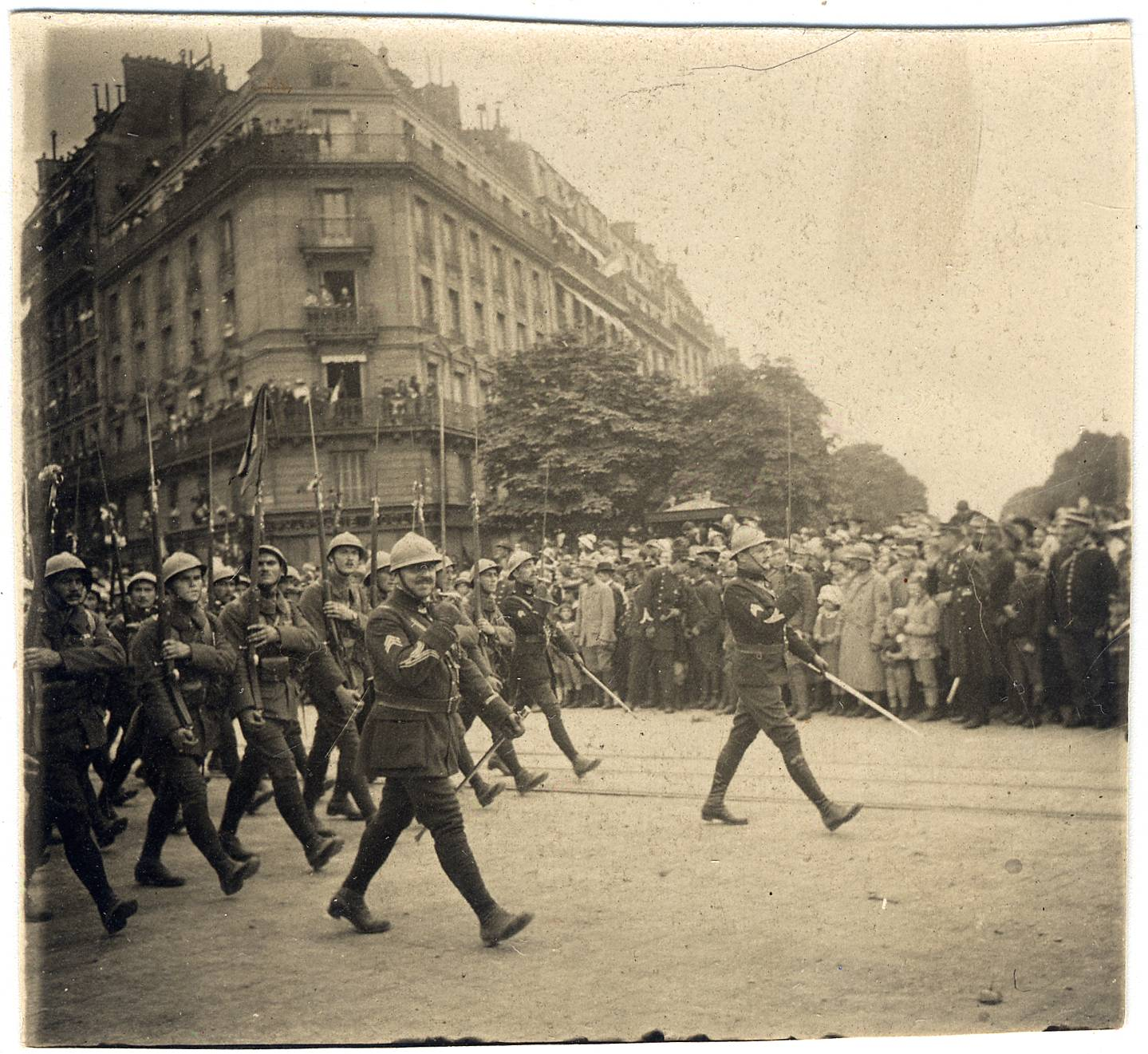
Military parade during World War I

The Bastille Day military parade is the French military parade that has been held in the morning, every year in Paris, since 1880. While previously held elsewhere within or near the capital city, since 1918 it has been held on the Champs-Élysées, with the participation of the Allies as represented in the Versailles Peace Conference, and with the exception of the period of German occupation from 1940 to 1944 (when the ceremony took place in London under the command of General Charles de Gaulle); and 2020 when the COVID-19 pandemic forced its cancellation. The parade passes down the Champs-Élysées from the Arc de Triomphe to the Place de la Concorde, where the President of the French Republic, his government and foreign ambassadors to France stand. This is a popular event in France, broadcast on French TV, and is the oldest and largest regular military parade in Europe.

Smaller military parades are held in French garrison towns, including Toulon and Belfort, with local troops.

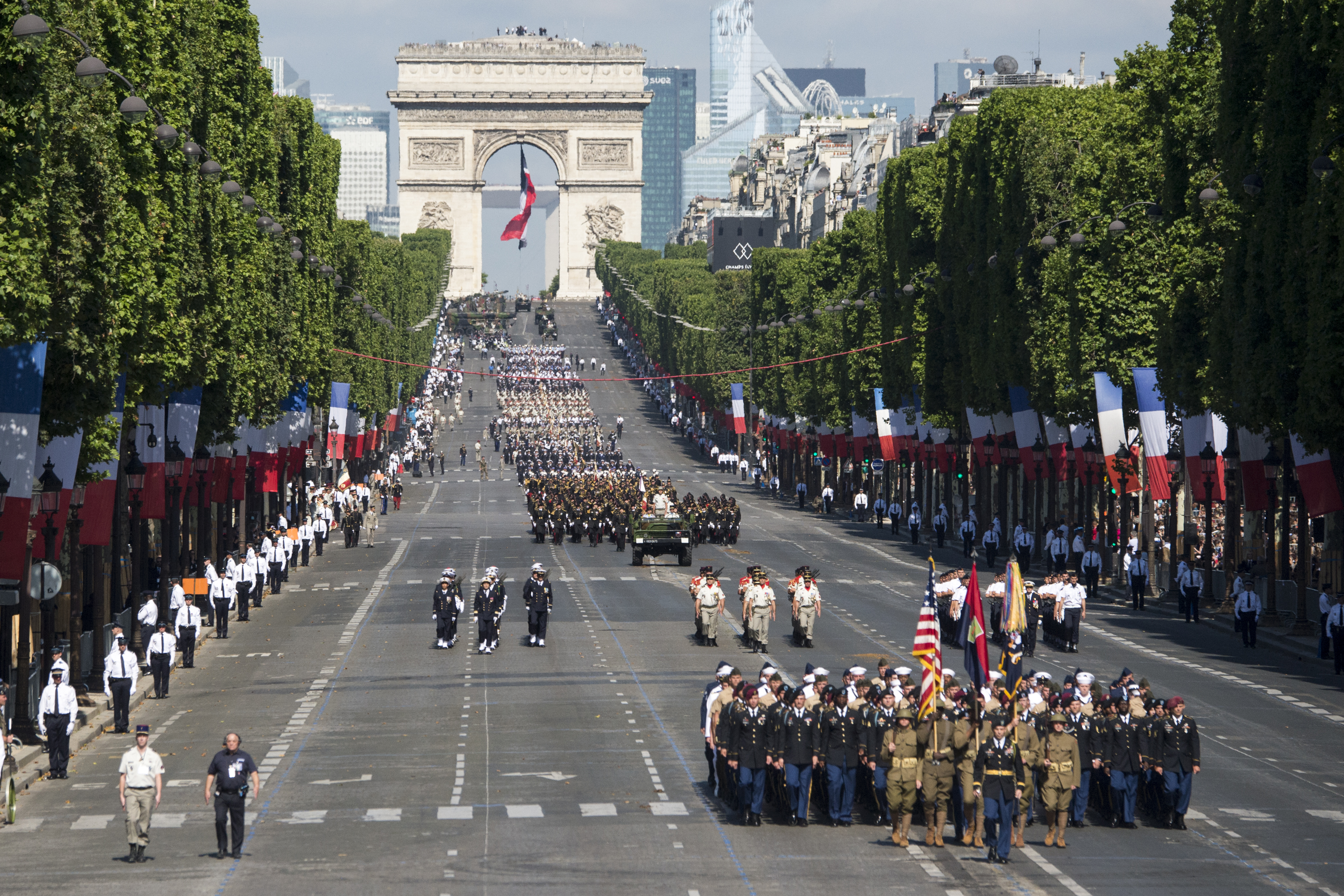
Allied forces participate in the military parade

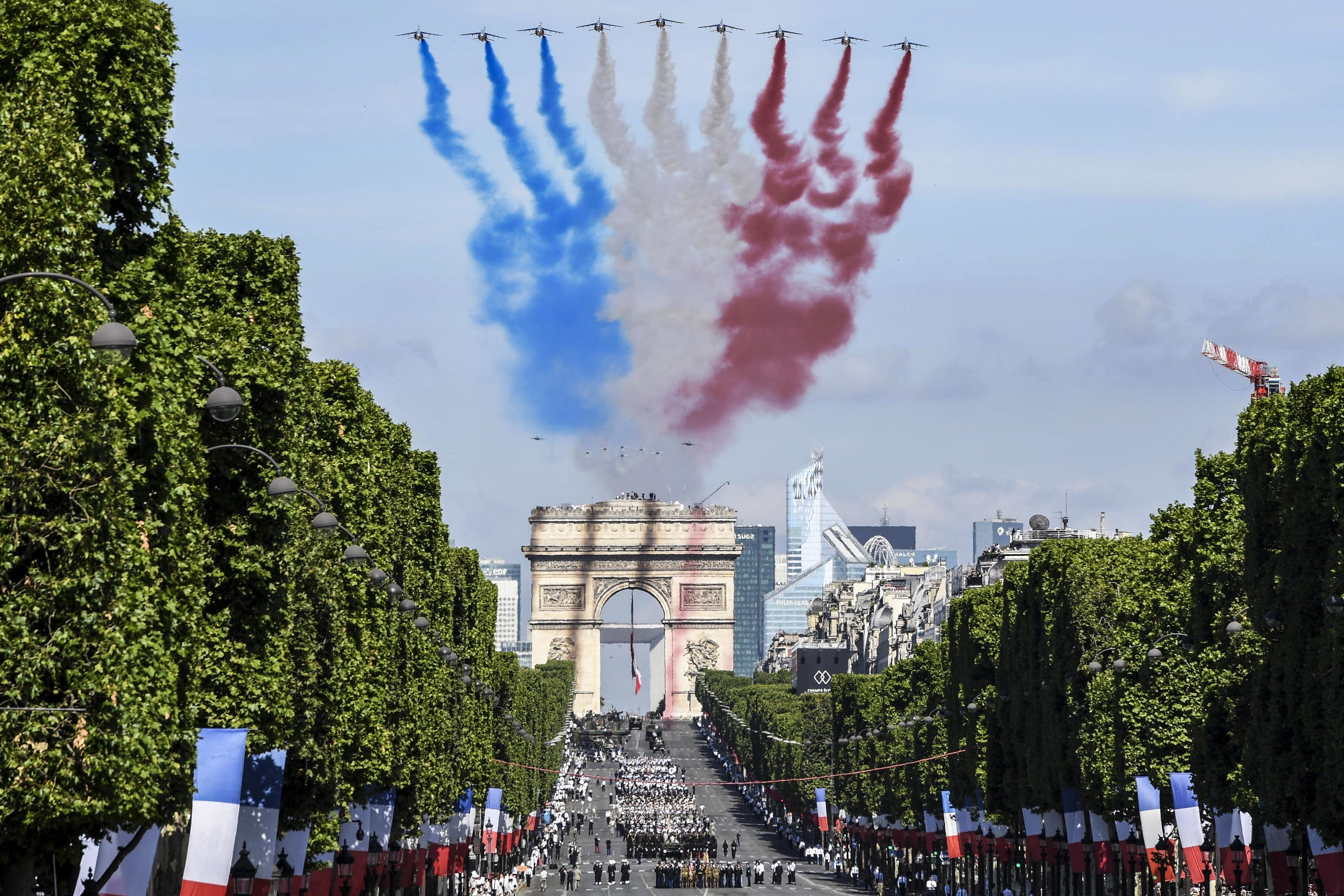
The Patrouille de France with nine Alpha Jets over the Champs-Élysées in Paris in 2017, during the Bastille Day military parade

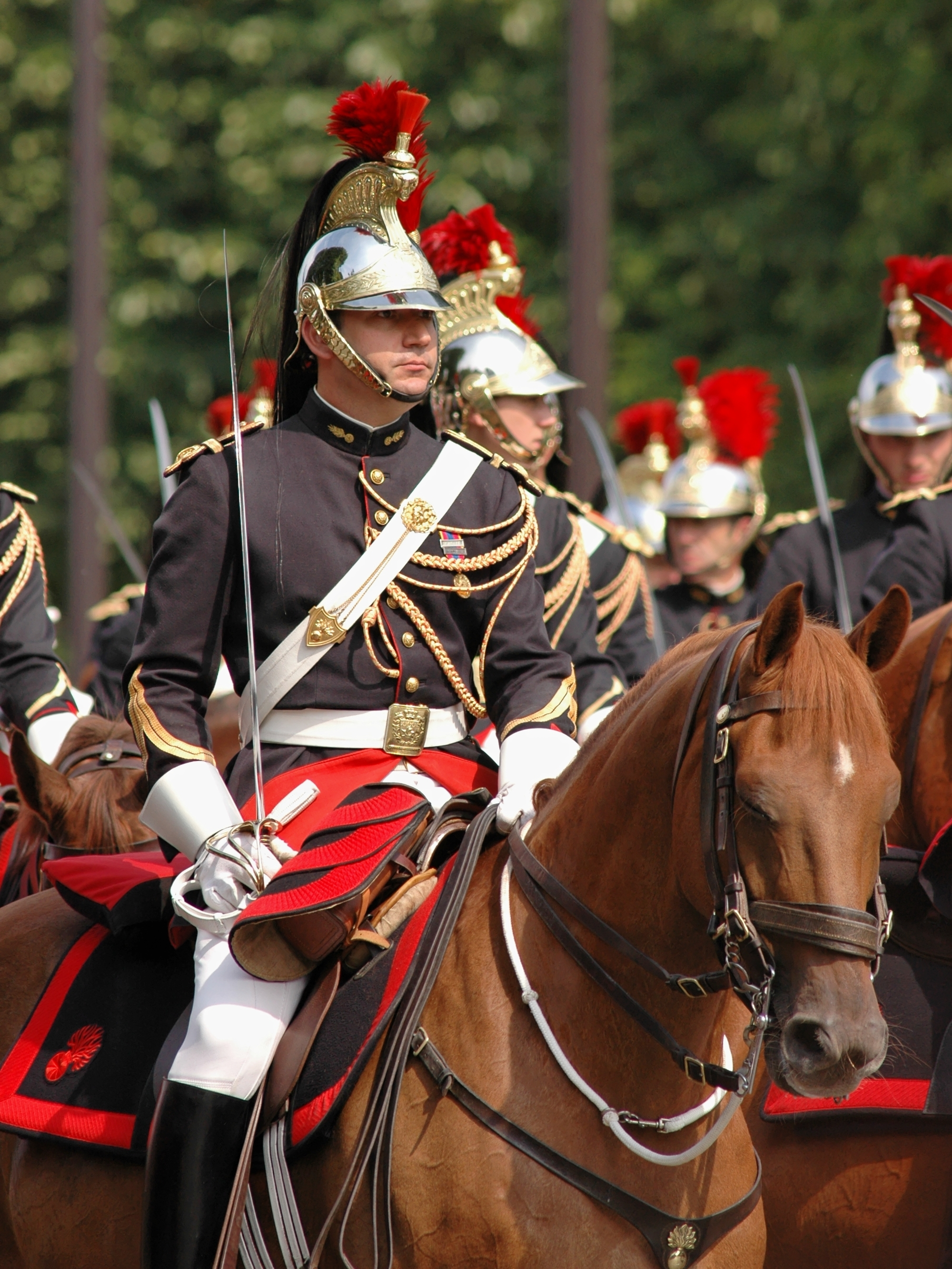
Horseman of the Republican Guard during the 2007 military parade on the Champs-Élysées

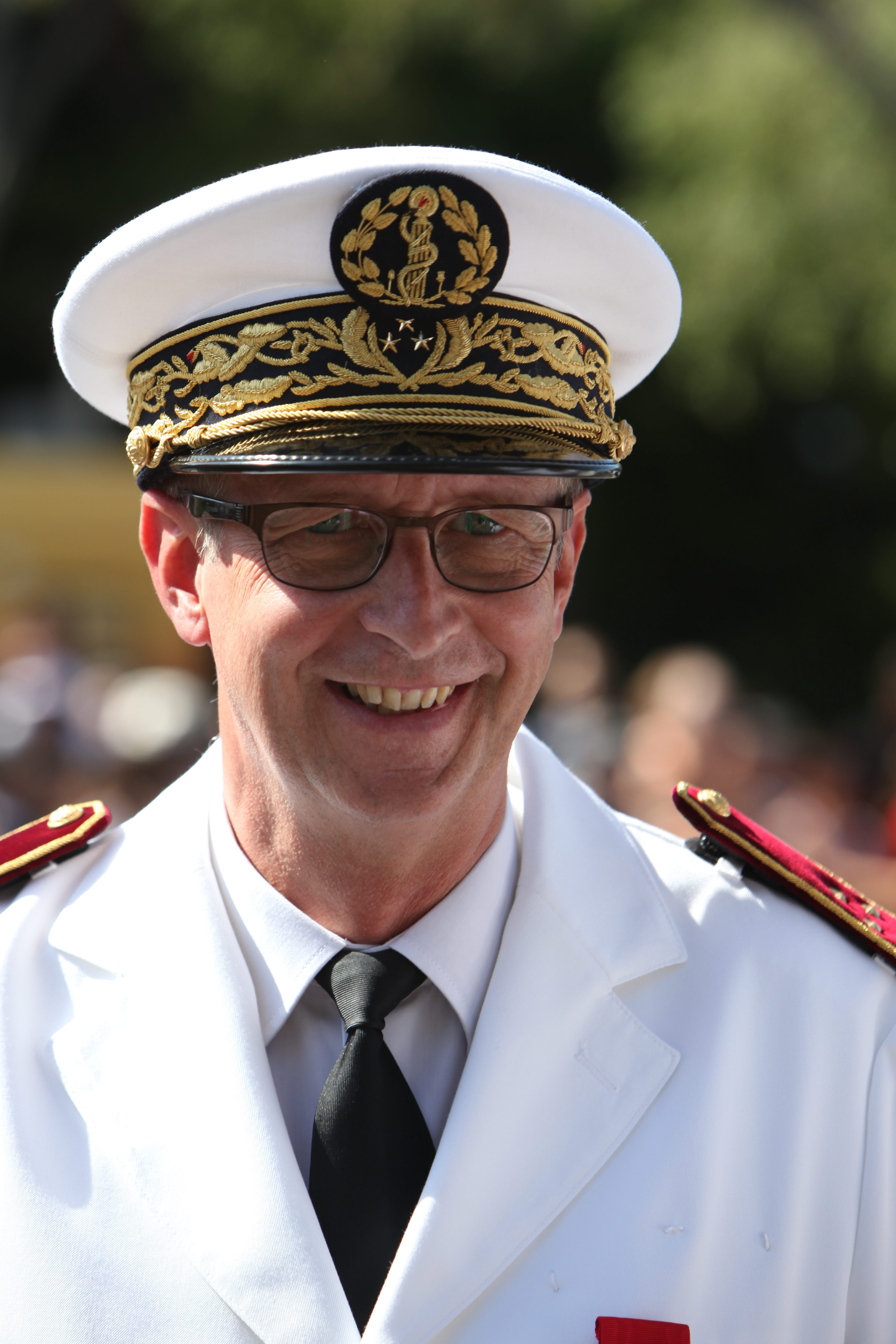
Surgeon general inspector Dominique Vallet, head of the Laveran military medical school, at the ceremonies for Bastille Day in Marseille, 2012

== Bastille Day celebrations in other countries ==
=== Belgium ===
Liège celebrates Bastille Day each year since the end of the First World War, as Liège was decorated by the Légion d'Honneur for its unexpected resistance during the Battle of Liège. The city also hosts a fireworks show outside of Congress Hall. Specifically in Liège, celebrations of Bastille Day have been known to be bigger than the celebrations of the Belgian National holiday. Around 35,000 people gather to celebrate Bastille Day. There is a traditional festival dance of the French consul that draws large crowds, and many unofficial events over the city celebrate the relationship between France and the city of Liège.

=== Canada ===
Vancouver, British Columbia, holds a celebration featuring exhibits, food, and entertainment. The Toronto Bastille Day festival is also celebrated in Toronto, Ontario. The festival is organized by the French-Canadian community in Toronto and sponsored by the Consulate General of France in Toronto. The celebration includes music, performances, sport competitions, and a French Market. At the end of the festival, there is also a traditional French bal populaire.

=== Czech Republic ===
Since 2008, Prague has hosted a French market "Le marché du 14 juillet" ("Fourteenth of July Market") offering traditional French food and wine as well as music. The market takes place on Kampa Island, it is usually between 11 and 14 July. It acts as an event that marks the relinquish of the EU presidency from France to the Czech Republic. Traditional selections of French produce, including cheese, wine, meat, bread and pastries, are provided by the market. Throughout the event, live music is played in the evenings, with lanterns lighting up the square at night.

=== Denmark ===
The amusement park Tivoli celebrates Bastille Day.

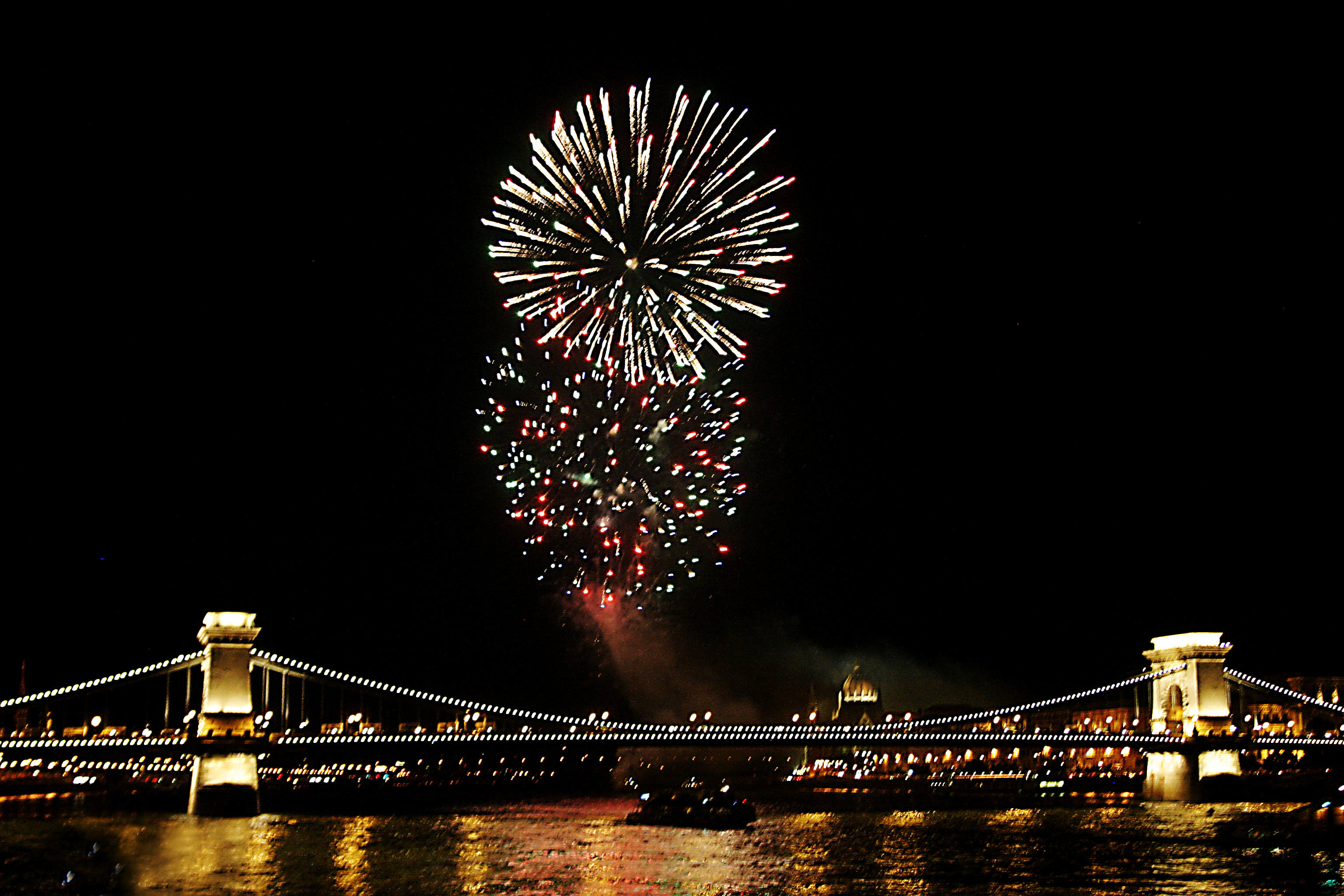
Bastille Day fireworks in Budapest, Hungary

=== Hungary ===
Budapest's two-day celebration is sponsored by the Institut de France. The festival is hosted along the Danube River, with streets filled with music and dancing. There are also local markets dedicated to French foods and wine, mixed with some traditional Hungarian specialties. At the end of the celebration, a fireworks show is held on the river banks.

=== India ===
Bastille Day is celebrated with great festivity in Pondicherry, a former French colony.

=== Ireland ===
The Embassy of France in Ireland organizes several events around Dublin, Cork and Limerick for Bastille Day; including evenings of French music and tasting of French food. Many members of the French community in Ireland take part in the festivities. Events in Dublin include live entertainment, speciality menus on French cuisine, and screenings of popular French films.

=== New Zealand ===
The Auckland suburb of Remuera hosts an annual French-themed Bastille Day street festival. Visitors enjoy mimes, dancers, music, as well as French foods and drinks. The budding relationship between the two countries, with the establishment of a Māori garden in France and exchange of their analyses of cave art, resulted in the creation of an official reception at the Residence of France. There is also an event in Wellington for the French community held at the Residence of France.

=== South Africa ===
Franschhoek's weekend festival has been celebrated since 1993. (Franschhoek, or 'French Corner,' is situated in the Western Cape.) As South Africa's gourmet capital, French food, wine and other entertainment is provided throughout the festival. The French Consulate in South Africa also celebrates their national holiday with a party for the French community. Activities also include dressing up in different items of French clothing.

=== French Polynesia ===
Following colonial rule, France annexed a large portion of what is now French Polynesia. Under French rule, Tahitians were permitted to participate in sport, singing, and dancing competitions one day a year: Bastille Day. The single day of celebration evolved into the major Heiva i Tahiti festival in Papeete Tahiti, where traditional events such as canoe races, tattooing, and fire walks are held. The singing and dancing competitions continue with music composed with traditional instruments such as the nasal flute and ukulele.

=== United Kingdom ===
Within the UK, London has a large French contingent, and celebrates Bastille Day at various locations across the city including Battersea Park, Camden Town and Kentish Town. Live entertainment is performed at Canary Wharf, with weeklong performances of French theatre at the Lion and Unicorn Theatre in Kentish Town. Restaurants feature cabarets and special menus across the city, and other celebrations include garden parties and sports tournaments. There is also a large event at the Bankside and Borough Market, where there is live music, street performers, and traditional French games played.

=== United States ===
More than 20 cities in the United States conduct annual celebrations of Bastille Day, with many French staples such as food, music, games, and sometimes the recreation of famous French landmarks.

Baltimore, Maryland, has a large Bastille Day celebration each year at Petit Louis in the Roland Park area.

Boston has a celebration annually, hosted by the French Cultural Center for 40 years. The street festival occurs in Boston's Back Bay neighborhood, near the Cultural Center's headquarters. The celebration includes francophone musical performers, dancing, and French cuisine.

New York City has numerous Bastille Day celebrations each July, including Bastille Day on 60th Street hosted by the French Institute Alliance Française between Fifth and Lexington Avenues on the Upper East Side of Manhattan, Bastille Day on Smith Street in Brooklyn, and Bastille Day in Tribeca. There is also the annual Bastille Day Ball, taking place since 1924.

Philadelphia's Bastille Day, held at Eastern State Penitentiary until 2018, involved Marie Antoinette throwing locally manufactured Tastykakes at the Parisian militia, as well as a re-enactment of the storming of the Bastille.

In Newport, Rhode Island, the annual Bastille Day celebration is organized by the local chapter of the Alliance Française. It takes place at King Park, at the monument memorializing the accomplishments of the General Comte de Rochambeau whose 6,000 to 7,000 French forces landed in Newport on 11 July 1780. Their assistance in the defeat of the English in the War of Independence is well documented and is proof of the special relationship between France and the United States.

In Washington D.C., food, music, and auction events are sponsored by the Embassy of France. There is also a French Festival within the city, where families can meet period entertainment groups set during the time of the French Revolution. Restaurants host parties serving traditional French food.

In Dallas, Texas, the Bastille Day celebration, "Bastille On Bishop", began in 2010 and is held annually in the Bishop Arts District of the North Oak Cliff neighborhood, southwest of downtown just across the Trinity River. Dallas' French roots are tied to the short-lived socialist Utopian community La Réunion, formed in 1855 and incorporated into the City of Dallas in 1860.

Miami's celebration is organized by "French & Famous" in partnership with the French American Chamber of Commerce, the Union des Français de l'Etranger and many French brands. The event gathers over 1,000 attendees to celebrate "La Fête Nationale". The location and theme change every year. In 2017, the theme was "Guinguette Party" and attracted 1,200 francophiles at The River Yacht Club.

New Orleans, Louisiana, has multiple celebrations, the largest in the historic French Quarter.

In Austin, Texas, the Alliance Française d'Austin usually conducts a family-friendly Bastille Day party at the French Legation, the home of the French representative to the Republic of Texas from 1841 to 1845.

Chicago, Illinois, has hosted a variety of Bastille Day celebrations in a number of locations in the city, including Navy Pier and Oz Park. The recent incarnations have been sponsored in part by the Chicago branch of the French-American Chamber of Commerce and by the French Consulate-General in Chicago.

Milwaukee's four-day street festival begins with a "Storming of the Bastille" with a 43-foot replica of the Eiffel Tower.

Minneapolis, Minnesota, has a celebration with wine, French food, pastries, a flea market, circus performers and bands. Also in the Twin Cities area, the local chapter of the Alliance Française has hosted an annual event for years at varying locations with a competition for the "Best Baguette of the Twin Cities".

Montgomery, Ohio, has a celebration with wine, beer, local restaurants' fare, pastries, games and bands.

St. Louis, Missouri, has annual festivals in the Soulard neighborhood, the former French village of Carondelet, Missouri, and in the Benton Park neighborhood. The Chatillon-DeMenil Mansion in the Benton Park neighborhood, holds an annual Bastille Day festival with reenactments of the beheading of Marie Antoinette and Louis XVI, traditional dancing, and artillery demonstrations. Carondelet also began hosting an annual saloon crawl to celebrate Bastille Day in 2017. The Soulard neighborhood in St. Louis, Missouri celebrates its unique French heritage with special events including a parade, which honors the peasants who rejected the monarchy. The parade includes a 'gathering of the mob,' a walking and golf cart parade, and a mock beheading of the King and Queen.

Portland, Oregon, has celebrated Bastille Day with crowds up to 8,000, in public festivals at various public parks, since 2001. The event is coordinated by the Alliance Française of Portland.

Seattle's Bastille Day celebration, held at the Seattle Center, involves performances, picnics, wine and shopping.

Sacramento, California, conducts annual "waiter races" in the midtown restaurant and shopping district, with a street festival.

== One-time celebrations ==
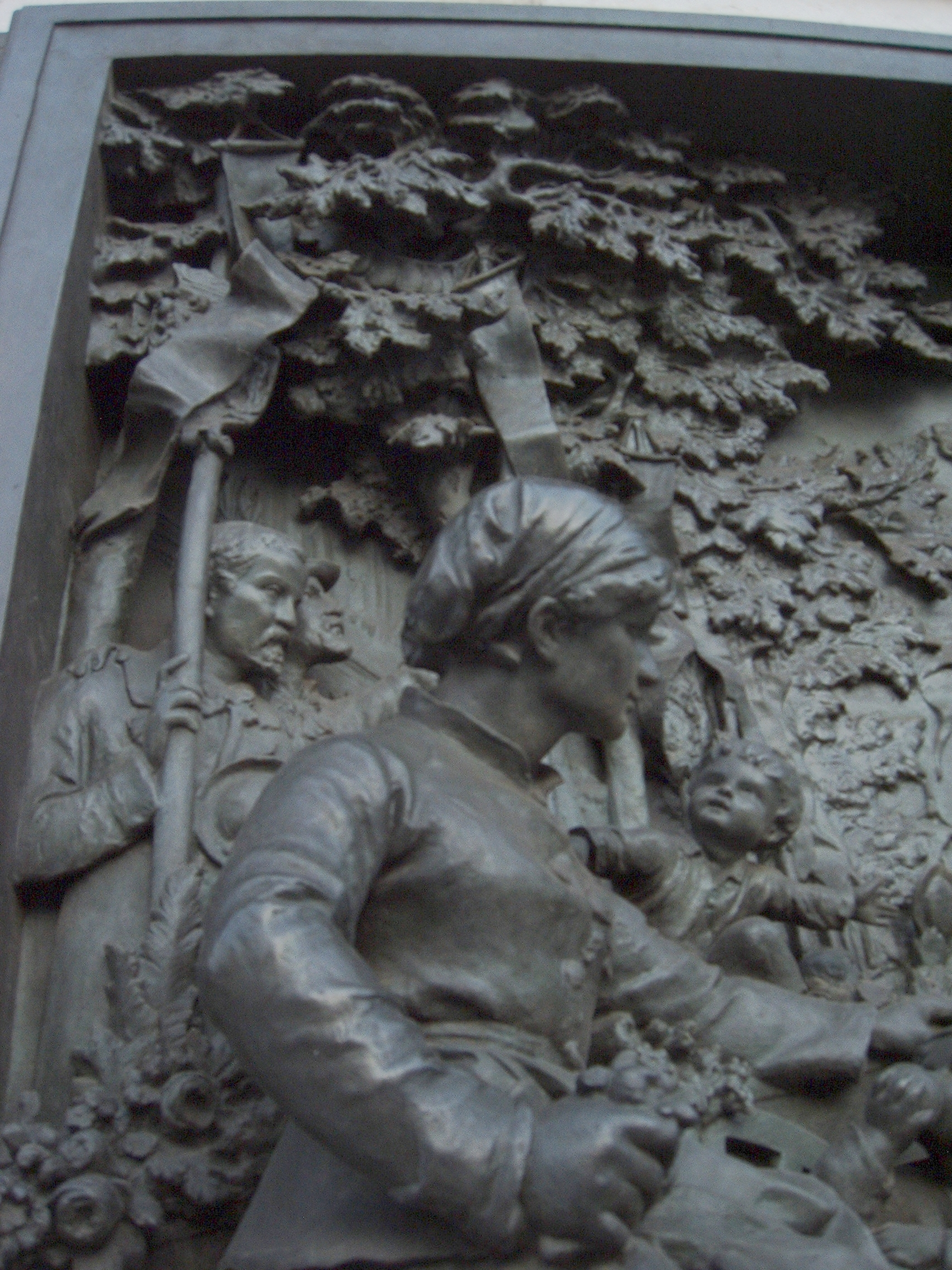
Bronze relief of a memorial dedicated to Bastille Day.

- 1979: A concert with Jean-Michel Jarre on the Place de la Concorde in Paris was the first concert to have one million attendees.
- 1989: France celebrated the 200th anniversary of the French Revolution, notably with a monumental show on the Champs-Élysées in Paris, directed by French designer Jean-Paul Goude. President François Mitterrand acted as a host for invited world leaders.
- 1990: A concert with Jarre was held at La Défense near Paris.
- 1994: The military parade was opened by Eurocorps, a newly created European army unit including German soldiers. This was the first time German troops paraded in France since 1944, as a symbol of Franco-German reconciliation.
- 1995: A concert with Jarre was held at the Eiffel Tower in Paris.
- 1998: Two days after the French football team became World Cup champions, huge celebrations took place nationwide.
- 2004: To commemorate the centenary of the Entente Cordiale, the British led the military parade with the Red Arrows flying overhead.
- 2007: To commemorate the 50th anniversary of the Treaty of Rome, the military parade was led by troops from the 26 other EU member states, all marching at the French time.
- 2014: To commemorate the 100th anniversary of the outbreak of the First World War, representatives of 80 countries who fought during this conflict were invited to the ceremony. The military parade was opened by 76 flags representing each of these countries.
- 2017: To commemorate the 100th anniversary of the United States of America's entry into the First World War, president of France Emmanuel Macron invited U.S. president Donald Trump to celebrate a centuries-long transatlantic tie between the two countries. Trump was reported to have admired the display, and pushed for the United States to "top it" with a proposed military parade on 10 November 2018 (the eve of the Armistice Day centenary).

== Incidents during Bastille Day ==
- In 2002, Maxime Brunerie attempted to shoot French President Jacques Chirac during the Champs-Élysées parade.
- In 2009, Paris youths set fire to more than 300 cars on Bastille Day.
- In 2016, Tunisian terrorist Mohamed Lahouaiej-Bouhlel drove a truck into crowds during celebrations in the city of Nice. 86 people were killed and 434 injured along the Promenade des Anglais, before the attacker was killed in a shootout with police.

== See also ==
- Bastille, a British alternative rock band named after the birthday of their frontman
- "Bastille Day", a song by Canadian progressive rock band Rush
- Bastille Day (1933 film), a French romantic comedy by René Clair
- Bastille Day (2016 film), a film starring Idris Elba
- Bastille Day event
- Opération 14 juillet
- Place de la Bastille
- Public holidays in France
- Other national holidays in July:
  - Canada Day in Canada
  - Independence Day/Fourth of July in the United States
  - Battle of the Boyne in Northern Ireland
  - Belgian National Day
