= John Kearney (artist) =

American artist (1924-2014)

John Kearney (August 31, 1924 – August 10, 2014) was an American artist, best known for his sculptures made of car bumpers. During his career, Kearney was based out of Chicago and Provincetown, Massachusetts. Many of his sculptures are displayed outside of public buildings.

== Life ==
Moose, Chicago, Illinois, USA

Kearney received his artistic education at the Cranbrook Academy of Art in Bloomfield Hills, Michigan, and the Universita per Stranieri in Perugia, Italy. In 1950, he co-founded the Contemporary Art Workshop in Chicago. Subsequently, he lived and worked in Italy numerous times, most notably in Rome in 1963 and 1964 while on a Fulbright Award, and in 1985 and 1992 while serving as a visiting artist at the American Academy in Rome.

Kearney learned his welding skills as a World War II U.S. Navy sailor while performing underwater repair of naval vessels.

== Awards ==
- Fulbright Award to Rome in 1963–64
- Italian Government Grant in 1963–64
- Visiting Artists at America Academy in Rome, 1985 and 1992

== Collections that own Kearney's work ==
- Aon (Standard Oil Building) in Chicago
- Detroit Children's Museum
- Illinois State Capitol Visitors Center, Springfield, Illinois
- Mitchell Museum, Mt. Vernon, Illinois
- Museum of Contemporary Art, Chicago
- Ulrich Museum, Wichita, Kansas
- Rockford Art Museum, Rockford, Illinois

== Solo exhibitions ==
- New York City at A.C.A. Gallery, 1964 to 1979
- Berta Walker Gallery, Provincetown, Massachusetts, 1992 to 1997

== Outdoor sculpture ==
In Chicago area

- Academy of Science (T. rex)
- Aon (formerly the Amoco Building and the Standard Oil Building) (three deer)
- Field Museum, South Entrance (two bronzes)
- Field Museum, penguin and deer inside an exhibit.
- Francis Parker School
- McCormick Seminary, Hyde Park, on University Avenue north of 55th Street (a large ram, named "Herald", pun referring to the Hyde Park Herald newspaper)
- Museum of Science and Industry (life-size gorilla)
- Oakton Community College
- Oz Park (the Tin Man (1995), Cowardly Lion (2001), Scarecrow (2005), and Dorothy and Toto (2007) from The Wizard of Oz)

Elsewhere

- Dallas Museum of Natural History, Dallas, Texas, and Ripley's Believe It or Not! Museum, Grand Prairie, Texas (Chromosaurs: Tyrannosaurus rex, Stegosaurus, and Triceratops)
- Mitchell Museum, Mt. Vernon, Illinois (one horse)
- Ulrich Museum, Wichita State University, Kansas (Grandfather's Horse)
- Maize South High School, Maize Kansas (one of Two Steers)
