= Nancy Ellen Craig =

American painter (1927-2015)

- Self-Portrait at an Easel, 1957
- Born: 1927; New York, New York
- Died: 2015 (aged 87–88); Truro, Massachusetts
- Known for: Painting

Nancy Ellen Craig (1927 – 2015) was an American painter known for her portraits.

Craig was born in Bronxville, New York in 1927. She attended Bennington College and the Art Students League of New York.

Craig died in 2015 in Truro, Massachusetts. In 2016 the Whistler House Museum of Art held a retrospective of her work. The same year the Berta Walker Gallery and the Provincetown Art Association and Museum held companion exhibitions of her work in Provincetown.

Her work is in the Baltimore Museum of Art, the Metropolitan Museum of Art, New Britain Museum of American Art, Town of Provincetown Art Collection, and Provincetown Art Association and Museum (PAAM).
