= Camille Raspail =

French politician

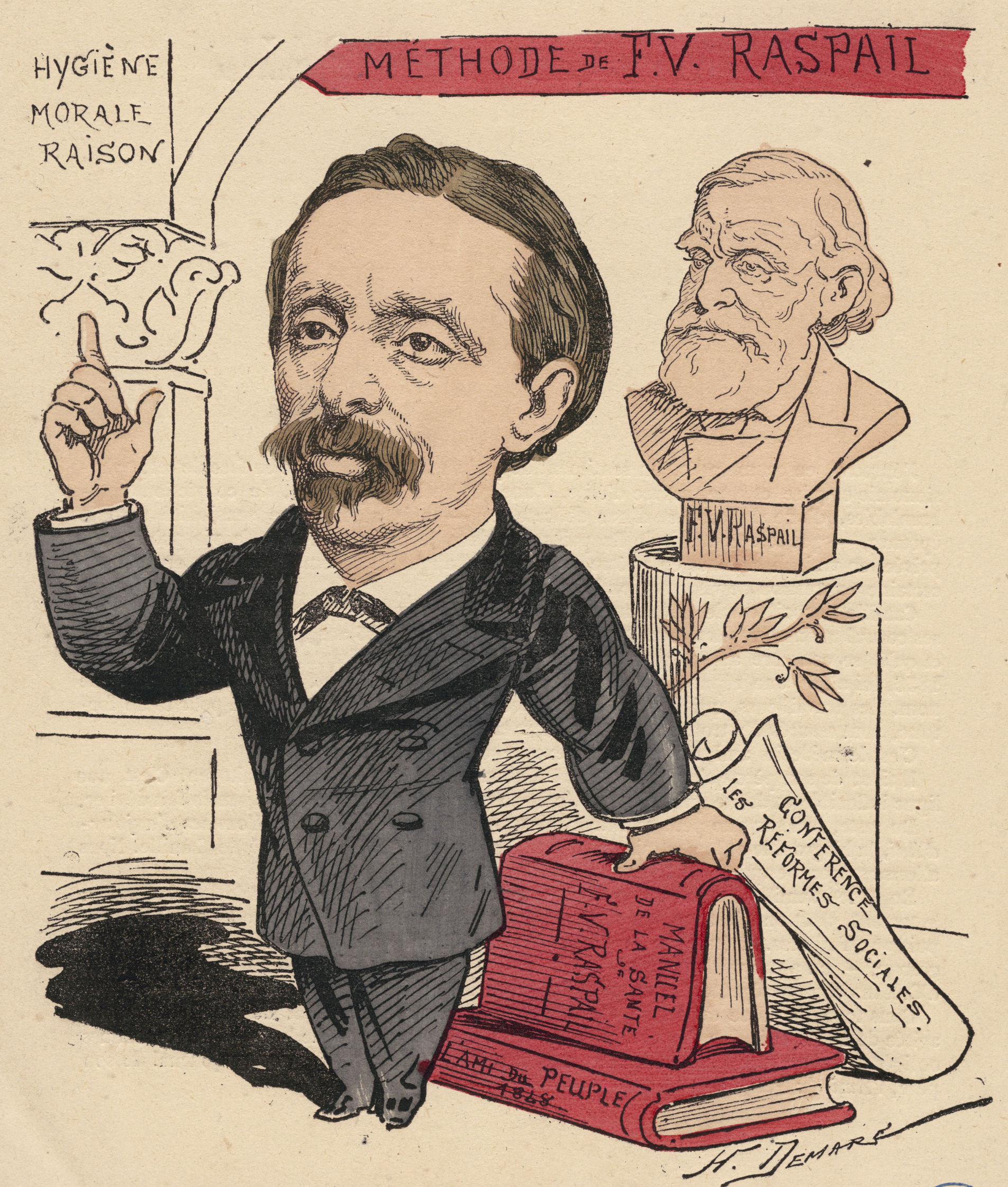
- Caricature of Raspail
- Born: Camille François Raspail; 17 August 1827; Paris, France
- Died: 26 May 1893 (aged 65); Paris, France
- Occupations: Doctor, politician
- Years active: politician 1885-1893

Camille Raspail (1827-1893) was a French doctor and politician in the National Assembly as a deputy from Var, from 1885 until his death in 1893. Son of François-Vincent Raspail, he practiced medicine for 44 years. He is buried in the Montparnasse Cemetery, with a three-quarter bronze bust on his tomb. On the tomb are engravings explaining he was commander in chief of the southern forts during the Siege of Paris in 1870-1871, as well as a doctor and deputy for Var. His tomb also has a bronze medallion showing a left-facing profile, along with a profile of his widow and an oak leaf crown.
