= Oz Park =

Park in Chicago, Illinois, United States

Coordinates: 41.9209°N 87.6456°W

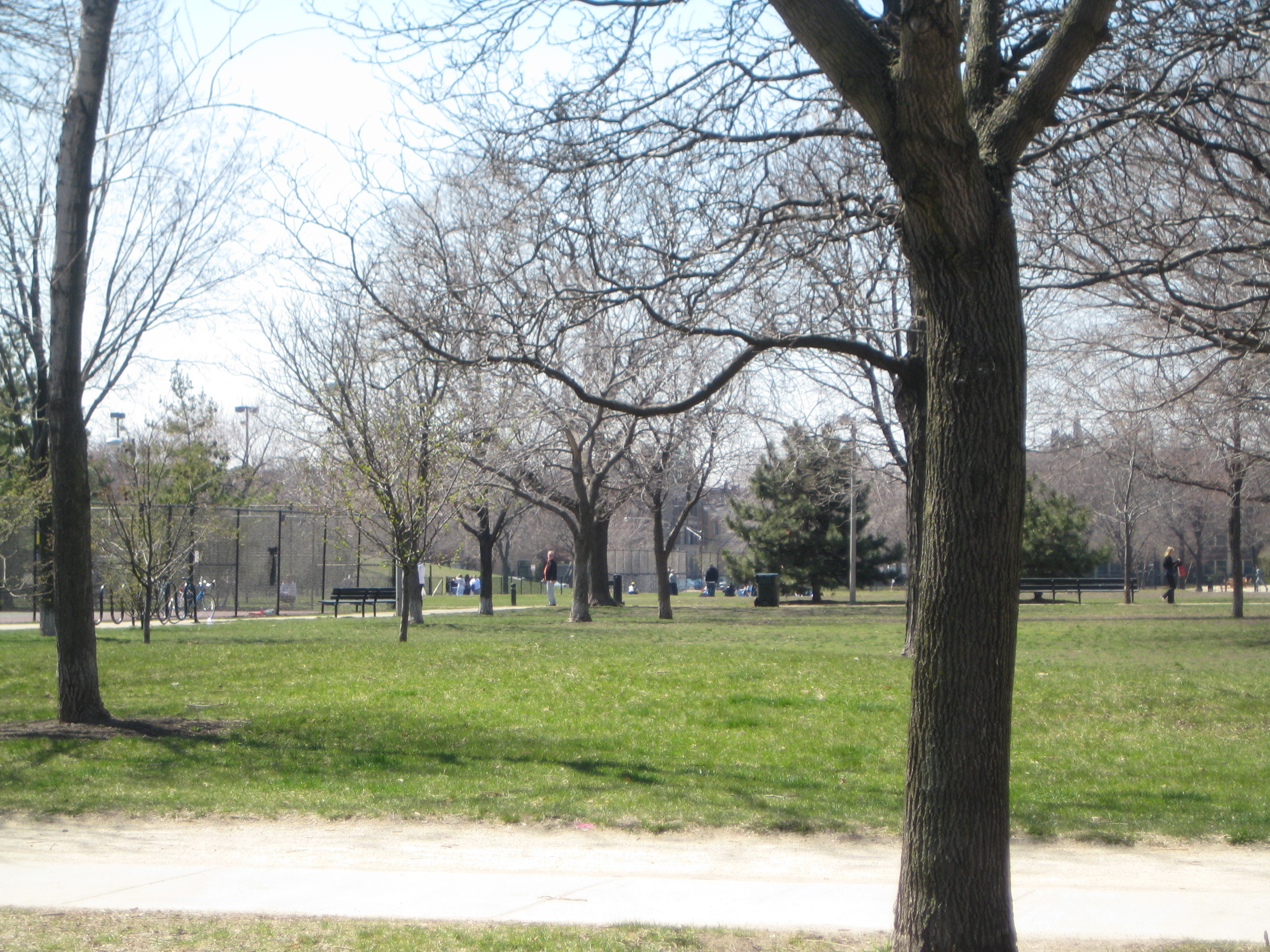
Oz Park in early Spring.

Oz Park is a public park in the Lincoln Park neighborhood of North Side, Chicago. It is located at 2021 North Burling Street, at the corner of Lincoln and Webster, just south of the Lincoln, Halsted, and Fullerton intersection.

The park borders Lincoln Park High School and features many statues fashioned after characters in The Wizard of Oz, a book which was authored by Chicago reporter L. Frank Baum.

== History ==
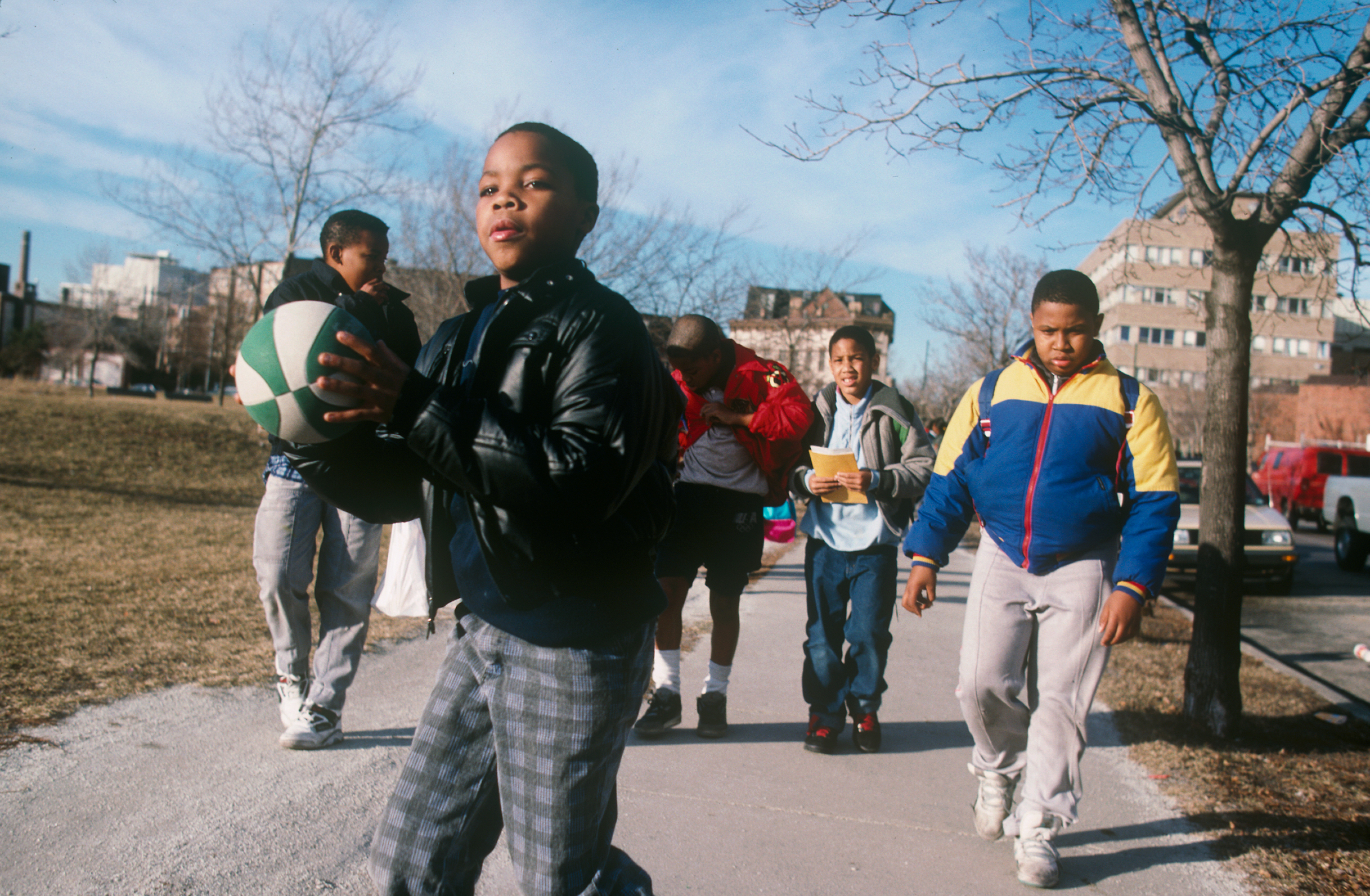
Children playing on the sidewalk by the park in 1989

During the 1950s, the area surrounding what is now called Oz Park was in need of improvement. The city of Chicago gave the Lincoln Park Conservation Association permission to improve the community in the 1960s. In 1974, the Chicago Park District acquired the land and began constructing a park. Lyman Frank Baum, a children's author and the creator of The Wonderful Wizard of Oz, was a resident of Chicago's Humboldt Park in the 1890s. Remembering its former resident, fans of The Wizard of Oz would gather in the park for an Oz Festival to honor the famous book, movie, and author every year. The park was officially named Oz Park in 1976, The Oz Park Advisory Council raised the money to put sculptures of the Tin Man, Cowardly Lion, Scarecrow, and Dorothy and Toto by sculptor John Kearney in the Park.

== Facilities ==
The 13.32-acre (53,900 m^{2}) park has one walking/biking trail, which is 0.61 miles (980 m) long. To go along with the Wizard of Oz theme, the park's garden is named "The Emerald Garden", and the playground is called "Dorothy's Playlot." The Emerald Garden (located at the corner of Webster and Larrabee) features flowers through which guests may walk. The Gardens are maintained by the Oz Park Advisory Council, which is a local group of volunteers. Dorothy's Playlot has swings and other climbing equipment on which children can play. While Dorothy is the main character of The Wizard of Oz, the playground is also named after Dorothy Melamerson, a retired Chicago gym teacher. Melamerson, interested in children's physical well-being, donated enough money in 1994 to create an athletic field with basketball courts, an asphalt volleyball court and tennis courts. In 1996 and 1997, $600,000 of the $900,000 that Melamerson left for park upgrades and to begin youth sports programs went to renovating the Oz Park athletic field. In her honor, the field was named Melamerson Athletic Field. State Representative John Fritchey and Alderman Vi Daley gave the Oz Park Advisory Council funding for improvements to Dorothy's Playlot in 2006. In 2007, Dorothy's Playlot was covered with a rubberized material, and several pieces of play equipment were replaced.

== Sculptures in the park ==
Shortly after the park had been built and named, the artist John Kearney was approached by an elderly woman who wanted him to create sculptures of the main characters from The Wizard of Oz to decorate the park. She died, however, before the park approved the project four years later. Approximately 30 years later the documents regarding the initial plans were found, and in the early 1990s Kearney was commissioned by the Oz Park Advisory council to create the first of the four statues. He later went on to create a total of four: The Tin Man, The Cowardly Lion, The Scarecrow, and Dorothy & Toto.

=== Tin Man ===
Installed in October 1995, the Tin Man sculpture stands at the northeast corner of the park near the intersection of Lincoln, Webster, and Larrabee. It is made from old automobile parts, which is Kearney's signature medium. The plaque below the statue reads "The Tin Man from The Wizard of Oz by Frank Baum welcomes you to Oz Park. A heartfelt salute to the community from the Lincoln Park Chamber of Commerce, October 1995."

=== Cowardly Lion ===
In June 2001, the Cowardly Lion statue was added to Oz Park. It stands in the southeast corner of the park near the intersection of Larrabee and Dickens. Unlike the Tin Man, the Cowardly Lion was created out of bronze, which was poured into wax casts to create the forms of the statue. The plaque below the statue reads "The Cowardly Lion became a citizen of Oz Park in June 2001. Commissioned by the Oz Park Advisory Council, created by Sculptor John Kearney, and made possible by three very generous donors: Wonderful Wizards, Good Witch Glindas, Emerald City Citizens." The names of the donors are written below each of the donor categories.

=== Scarecrow ===
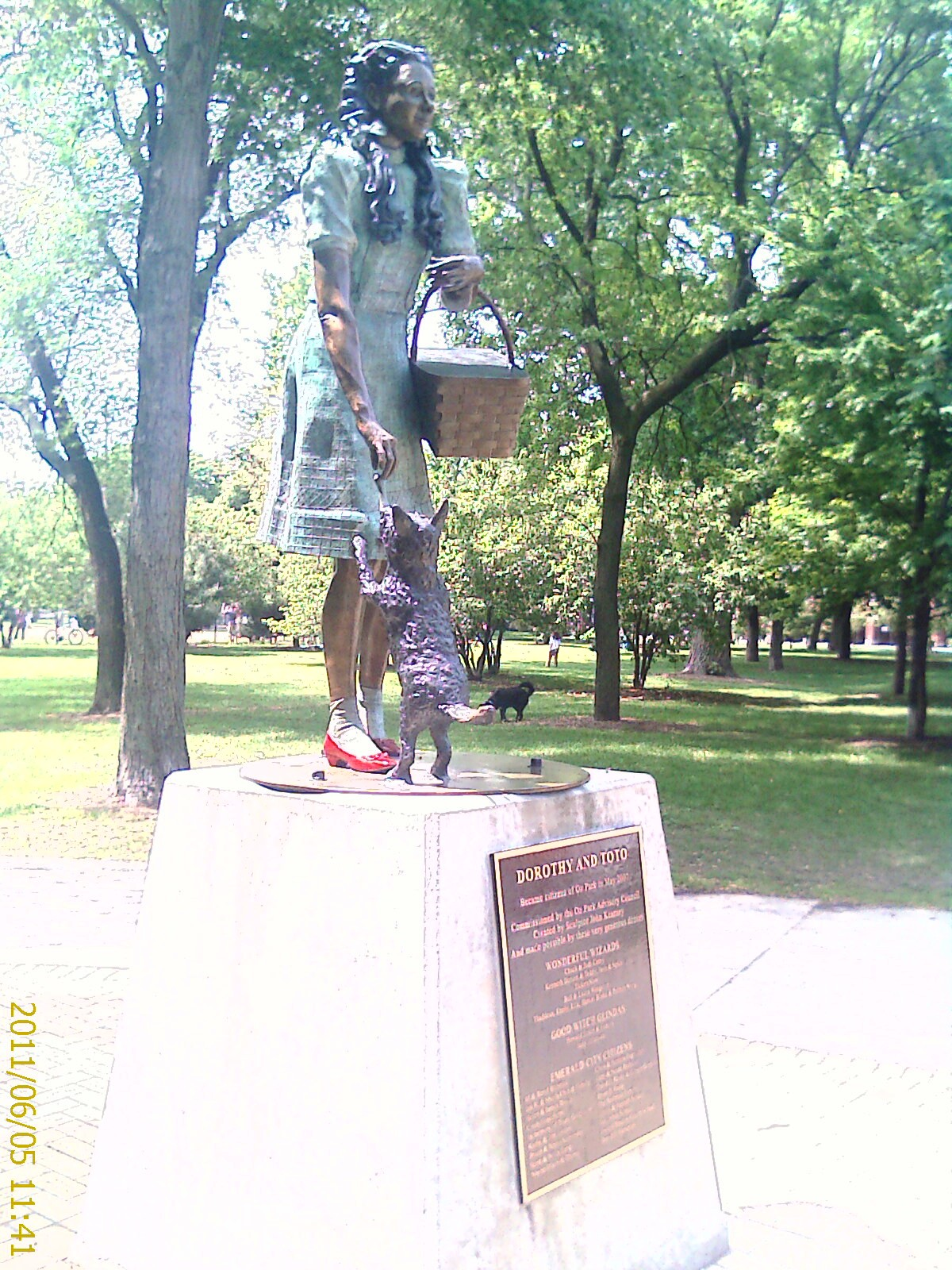
Statue of Dorothy and Toto in Oz Park

The statue of the Scarecrow joined its companions in the park in June 2005. The statue stands closely behind the statue of the Tin Man in Emerald City Gardens. It was made in the same way as the statue of the Cowardly Lion out of bronze. The plaque below the statue is almost identical to that of the Cowardly Lion and reads "The Scarecrow became a citizen of Oz Park in June 2005. Commissioned by the Oz Park Advisory Council, created by Sculptor John Kearney, and made possible by three very generous donors: Wonderful Wizards, Good Witch Glindas, Emerald City Citizens." The names of the donors are written below each of the donor categories.

=== Dorothy and Toto ===
The statue of Dorothy and Toto was added to the park in May 2007. The statue stands on the west side of the park near "Dorothy's Playlot". It too is made in bronze using the same process as was used to create the statues of the Cowardly Lion ad the Scarecrow. The plaque below the statue reads "Dorothy & Toto became citizens of Oz Park in May 2007. Commissioned by the Oz Park Advisory Council, created by Sculptor John Kearney, and made possible by three very generous donors: Wonderful Wizards, Good Witch Glindas, Emerald City Citizens." The names of the donors are written below each of the donor categories.
