= Benjamin Raspail =

French politician (1823–1899)

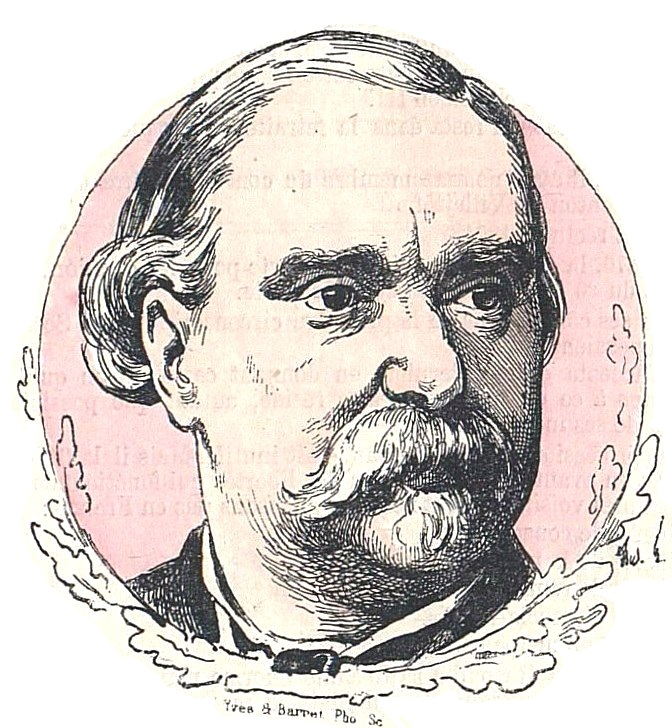

member of the council for Seine
- In office 1876–1899

Personal details
- Born: 16 August 1823 Paris, France
- Died: 24 September 1899 (aged 76) Cachan, France
- Parent: François-Vincent Raspail (father)

Benjamin Raspail (French pronunciation: [bɛ̃ʒamɛ̃ ʁaspaj]; 16 August 1823 in Paris – 24 September 1899 in Cachan, Seine, now Val-de-Marne), was a painter-engraver and politician of the French Third Republic. He was the son of François-Vincent Raspail. Like his father, he was classed as extreme-left, and he went into exile in Belgium with his father from 1853.

In 1874, following the death of Eugène Lavenant, Raspail took over as Mayor of Arcueil as "premier conseiller inscrit au tableau". He was also a member of the conseil général for Seine.

As member of the council for Seine for the Republican left, Raspail proposed the law, on 21 May 1880, which made 14 July a national holiday in commemoration of the storming of the Bastille and the Fête de la Fédération. The bill was signed by 64 members, and was adopted by the Assemblée Nationale on 8 June and by the Sénat on 29 June. The bill was promulgated on 6 July 1880. He also proposed the law to seize the crown jewels from the monarchy, which was passed on 11 January 1887.

In 1841, when he was 18-years old, he lost a leg, which had to be amputated, following a chase in Épinay by a stone-throwing mob.

Upon his death, Raspail bequeathed his estate in Cachan to become a retirement home for people with work-related disabilities, and also a museum which would house his father's political documents and painting collection, as well as his own painting collection.

== Electoral mandates ==
- 1876–1877 : Seine
- 1877–1881 : Seine
- 1881–1885 : Seine
- 1885–1889 : Seine
