= Carmen Cicero =

American painter

Carmen Louis Cicero (born August 14, 1926) is an American painter from Newark, New Jersey.

== Work ==
Cicero started as an abstract painter and used automatism in his drawings of memories of places. In 1971 a studio fire destroyed the work still in his possession. He moved to New York and started over in a dramatically different figurative style. In the 1990s, Cicero's style changed again, from figurative expressionism to visionary realism reminiscent of magic realism.

== Education ==
Cicero attended the New Jersey State Teachers College (now Kean University) from 1947 to 1951. Cicero studied painting under Hans Hofmann and Robert Motherwell at Hunter College in 1953. He received an MFA from Montclair State University in 1991.

== Teaching ==
Cicero taught painting at Sarah Lawrence College 1959 to 1968. Cicero was a professor of painting at Montclair State University from 1970 through 2001.

== Collections ==
Work by Cicero is in the collection of the Museum of Modern Art, the Smithsonian American Art Museum, and the Whitney Museum of American Art.

== Awards ==
- Pollock-Krasner Foundation Grant, 2008
- Jacob Lawrence and Gwendolyn Knight Lawrence Awards, 2016.
