= François-Vincent Raspail =

French chemist, naturalist, physician, physiologist, attorney and politician

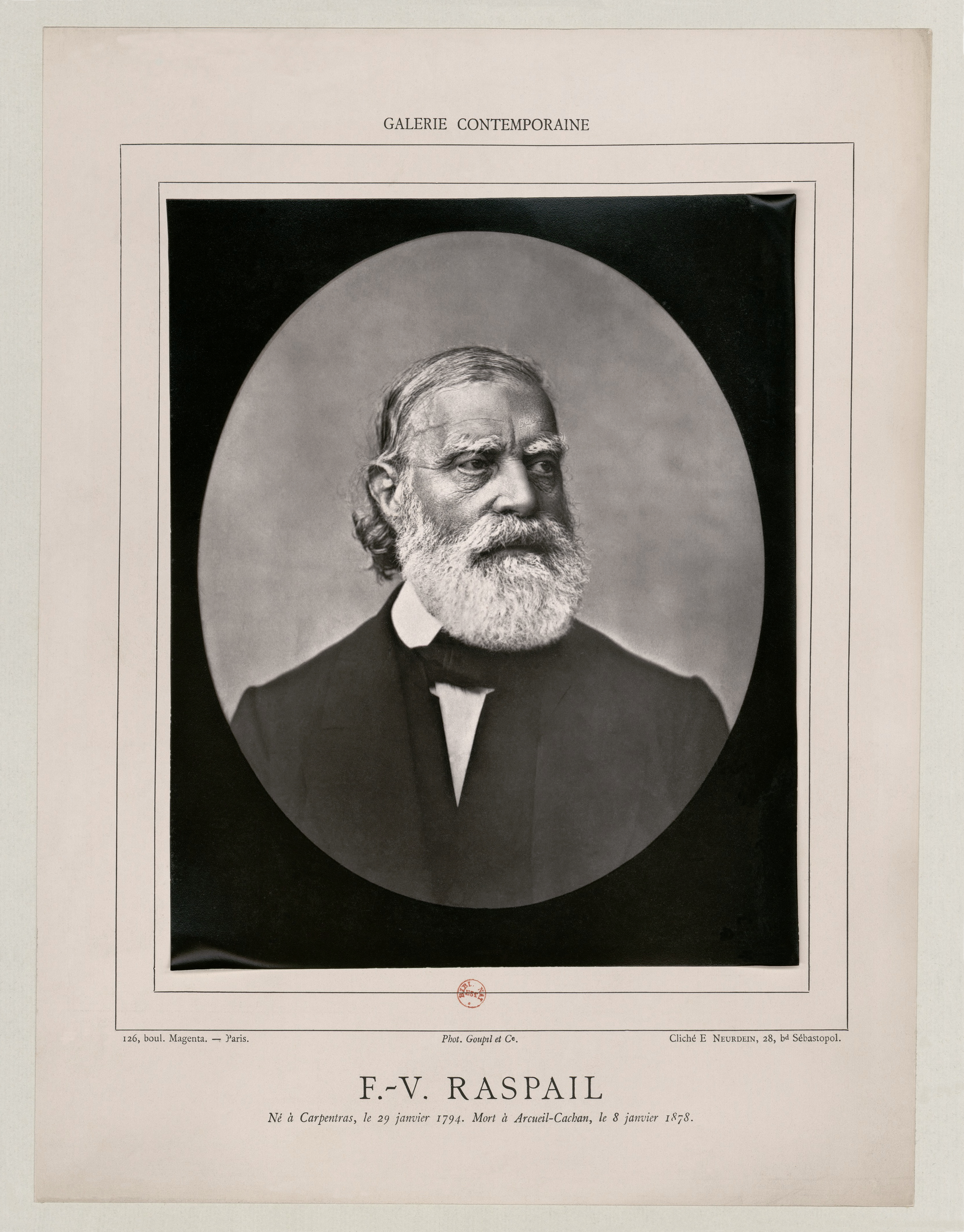
François-Vincent Raspail

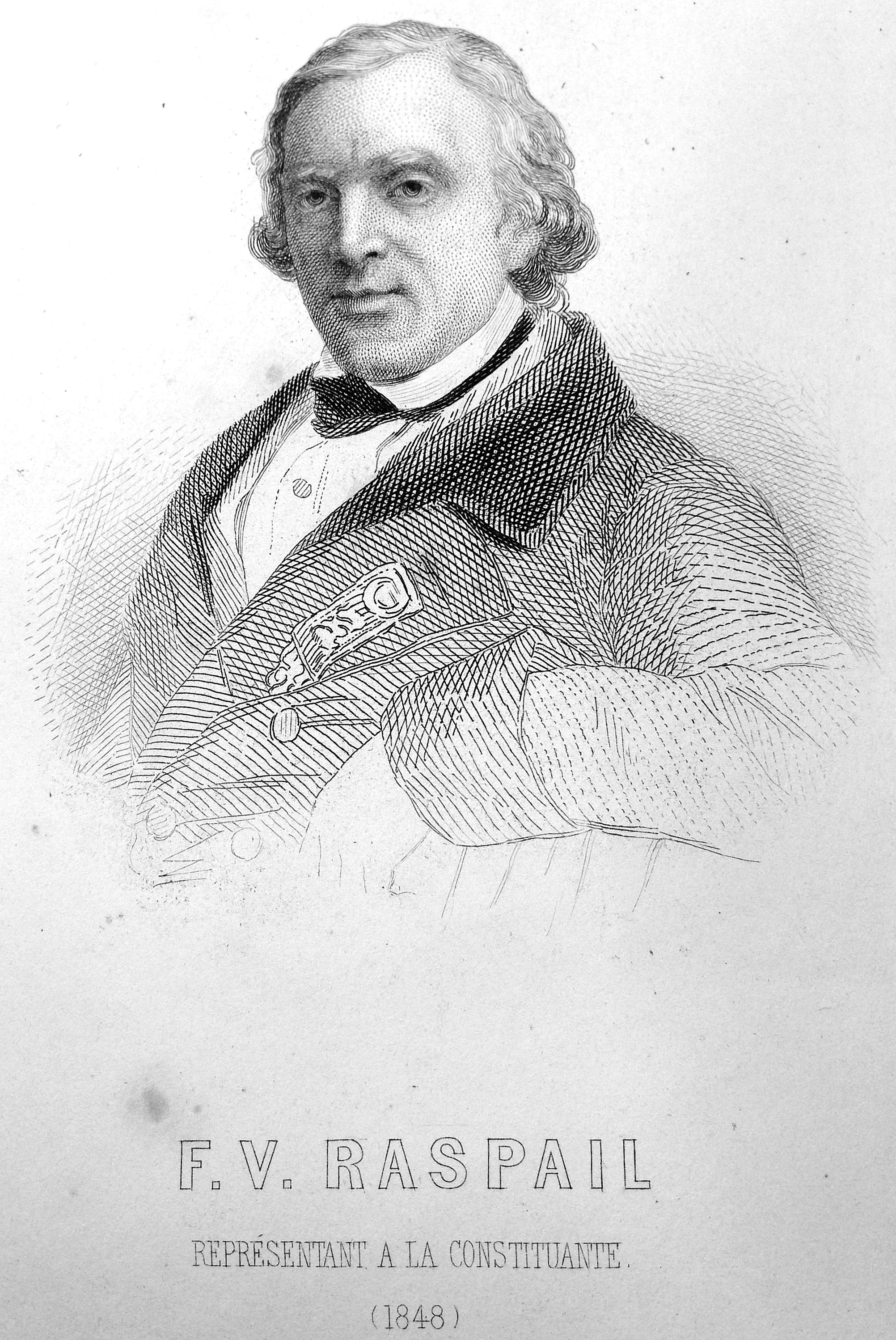
FV Raspail, gravure (1848)

François-Vincent Raspail, L.L.D., M.D. (French pronunciation: [fʁɑ̃swa vɛ̃sɑ̃ ʁaspaj]; 25 January 1794 – 7 January 1878) was a French chemist, naturalist, medical doctor, physiologist, lawyer, and socialist politician.

== Biography ==
Raspail was born in Carpentras, Vaucluse. A member of the republican Carbonari society and Freemasonry, where he met François Arago, Victor Schoelcher and Auguste Blanqui, Raspail was imprisoned during Louis Philippe's reign (1830–1848) and was a candidate for presidency of the Second Republic in December 1848. However, he was then involved in the attempted revolt of 15 May 1848 and in March 1849 was again imprisoned as a result. After Louis Napoleon's 2 December 1851 coup, his sentence was commuted to exile, from which he returned to France only in 1862. In 1869, during the liberal phase of the Second Empire (1851–1870), he was elected deputy from Lyons. He remained a popular republican during the French Third Republic after the short-term Paris Commune in 1871.

Raspail died in Arcueil.

His sons, Benjamin Raspail (1823), Camille Raspail (1827), Émile Raspail (1831), and Xavier Raspail (1840) were also all notable figures in the Third Republic. His daughter, Marie Raspail (1837-1876), was a freethinker and republican; she was a staunch supporter of her father and died from an illness contracted while caring for him during his time as a political prisoner towards the end of his life.

=== Scientific achievements ===
Raspail was one of the founders of the cell theory in biology. Raspail did not coin the phrase omnis cellula e cellula ("every cell is derived from a [preexisting] cell") stated later by Rudolf Karl Virchow, as can be confirmed reading his work "Développement de la fécule dans les organes de la fructification des céréales, et analyse microscopique de la fécule, suivie d'expériences propres à en expliquer la conversion en gomme. Annales des Sciences Naturelles, 6 (1825): 224 e 384", where this phrase is not found. However, he claimed that starch grains were the progenitors of new vesicles. He was an early proponent of the use of the microscope in the study of plants. He was also an early advocate of the use of antiseptic(s) and better sanitation and diet. His "Manuel annuaire de la santé 1834" is portrayed in the painting "Nature morte avec oignons/Still life with a plate of onions" by Vincent van Gogh (1889 Kroller-Muller).

=== Entry into politics ===
After the revolution of 1830, Raspail became involved in politics. He was President of the Human Rights Society, and was imprisoned for that role. While in prison, he tended sick inmates and studied their diseases. He became convinced of the value of camphor, which he believed worked by killing extremely small parasites – a version of the germ theory of disease.

=== Later career ===
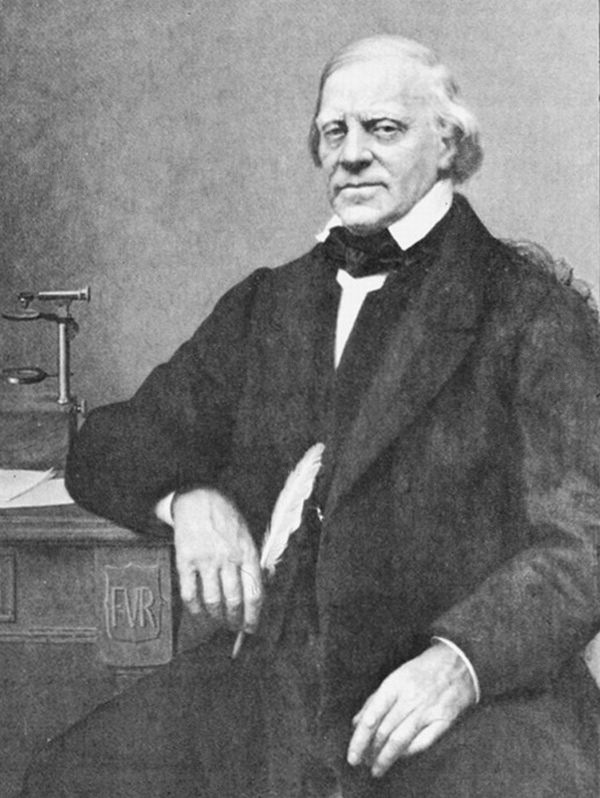
François-Vincent Raspail

Raspail was a candidate for the Presidency of the French Second Republic in December 1848, but came in fourth, losing to Louis-Napoléon Bonaparte (later Napoleon III). He had been involved in the attempted revolt of 15 May 1848, and in March 1849 was again imprisoned as a result. In 1853, Napoleon III commuted his sentence of imprisonment to one of exile. He returned to France from exile in 1862. In 1869 he was elected deputy from Lyon and in 1875 from Marseille. He remained popular and respected during the French Third Republic. The longest boulevard in Paris, in the 7th, 6th and 14th arrondissements, was named Boulevard Raspail in his honor, after which the Raspail Métro station takes its name.

== Publications ==
- Essai de chimie microscopique 1830
- Nouveau système de chimie organique 1833
- Manuel annuaire de la santé 1834, reissued annually
- Le Réformateur (newspaper, published 1834–35)
- Lettres sur les Prisons du Paris 1839
- Histoire naturelle de la santé 1843
- Manuel annuaire de la Santé, ou Médecine et Pharmacie domestiques . Selbstverl., Paris 1845 Digital edition by the University and State Library Düsseldorf

== See also ==
- French demonstration of 15 May 1848
