= Berta Walker =

American art dealer and curator (born 1941)

- Born: November 14, 1941 (age 84)
- Occupations: Art dealer, curator, gallerist
- Known for: Founder and director of Berta Walker Gallery
- Relatives: T. B. Walker (great-grandfather); Harvey Bartlett Gaul (maternal grandfather)

Berta Walker (born November 14, 1941) is an American art dealer, curator, and gallerist based in Provincetown, Massachusetts. She is the founder and director of the Berta Walker Gallery, which opened at its current location on Bradford Street in 1990. Walker has been an active figure in preserving and promoting the historic and contemporary art colony of the Outer Cape, connecting early 20th-century American modernists and abstract expressionists with living regional artists. She has held administrative and curatorial posts at Manhattan's Whitney Museum of American Art, Marisa del Re Gallery, Graham Modern Gallery, and the Fine Arts Work Center (FAWC) in Provincetown.

== Early life and family background ==
Walker was born on November 14, 1941, and raised in an artistic milieu. Her great-grandfather, lumber magnate T. B. Walker, founded the Walker Art Center in Minneapolis. Her maternal grandparents were composer Harvey Bartlett Gaul and writer Harriet Avery Gaul, who first arrived in Provincetown in 1915. Her parents, art dealer and collector Hudson D. Walker and artist Ione Gaul Walker, operated a gallery on 57th Street in New York City and brought their three daughters—Berta, her twin sister Louise, and older sister Harriet—to Provincetown beginning in the 1940s. Her father was a principal founder of FAWC and served as president of Artists Equity. During childhood summers in the Cape Cod dunes, Walker spent time with the families of artists Philip Malicoat and Boris Margo, and she occasionally babysat for the children of Robert Motherwell and Mark Rothko.

== Career ==
Walker began her career in the arts coordinating special events at the Whitney Museum of American Art. While organizing New York fundraisers for FAWC, she was recruited to direct the Marisa del Re Gallery. She subsequently spent five years launching and managing Graham Modern Gallery on Madison Avenue, curating shows for painters with Outer Cape roots such as Paul Resika, Selina Trieff, and Carmen Cicero. In 1989, Walker took on the role of acting executive director at the Fine Arts Work Center during an administrative transition.

In 1990, Walker established the Berta Walker Gallery in Provincetown's East End by purchasing and combining two storefronts at 208 Bradford Street. The space centered on artists with strong ties to the region, operating in concert with nearby venues like the Long Point Gallery and the Rising Tide Gallery. Throughout her tenure, Walker organized retrospective and thematic exhibitions, such as Provincetown Generations in the Arts (1992)—which surveyed multigenerational artist families dating back to 1916—and the 1998 Charles Hawthorne Centennial exhibition. The gallery also earned distinction for its advocacy of women artists and for hosting designated benefit exhibitions that donated 20 percent of sales profits equally between the Provincetown Art Association and Museum (PAAM) and FAWC. In tribute to her institutional advocacy, PAAM dedicated the Berta Walker Sculpture Garden on its museum grounds.

== Personal life ==
Walker resides in Provincetown and remains active in the civic and cultural stewardship of the historic arts colony.
