= Nashaquitsa Pond =

Salt pond

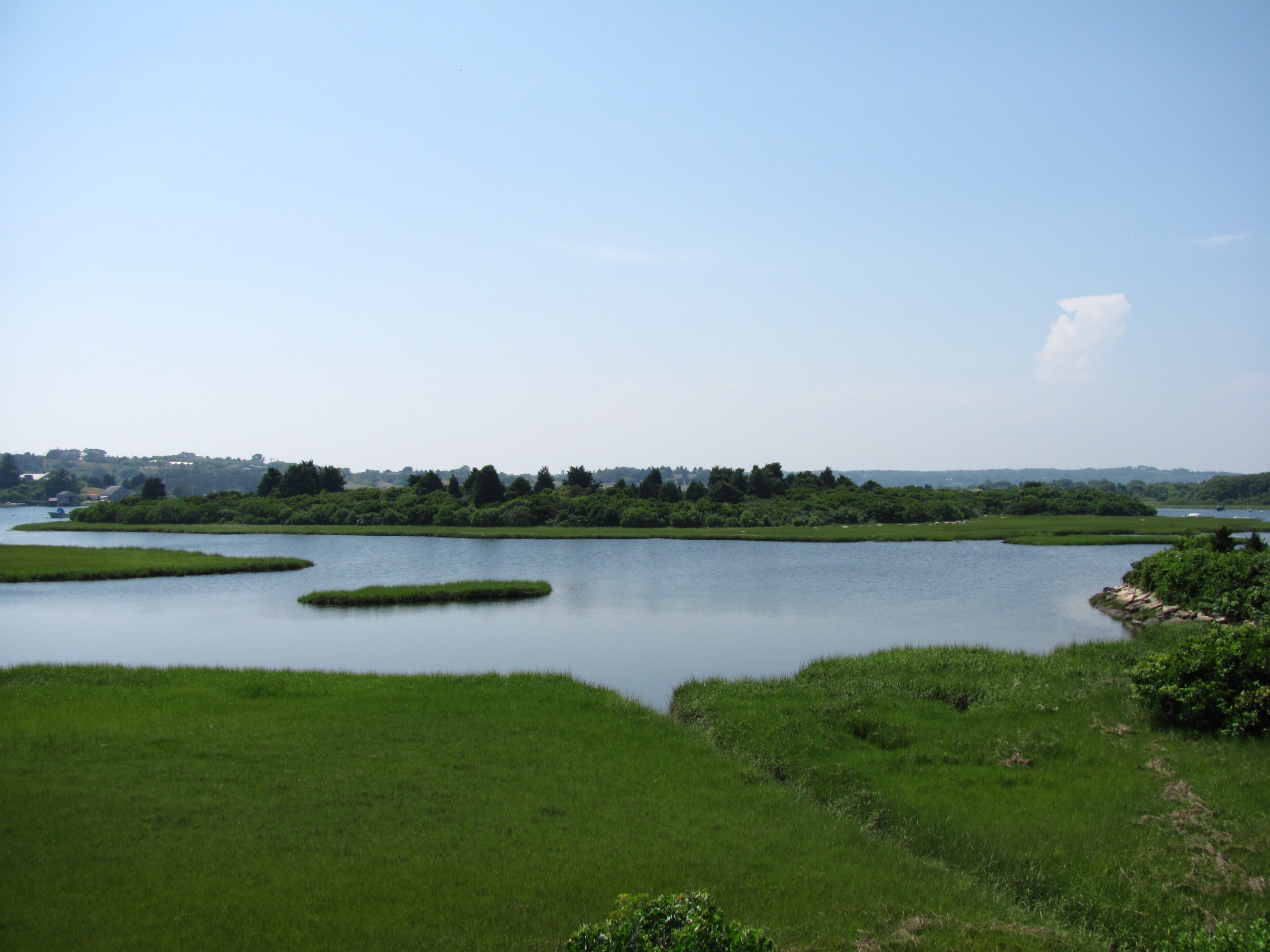

- Location within Massachusetts
- Location: Chilmark, Massachusetts
- Coordinates: 41°19′35″N 70°46′05″W
- Type: Salt Pond
- Basin countries: United States
- Surface area: 92 acres (37 ha)

Nashaquitsa Pond is a salt pond in the town of Chilmark, Massachusetts. Nashaquitsa Pond connects to both Stonewall Pond and Menemsha Pond.

== History ==
Archeological exploration indicates that indigenous peoples of the Wampanoag tribe have inhabited the shores of the region for approximately 10,000 to 7,500 years. In his 1969 book, Archaeology of Martha's Vineyard, William A Ritchie excavated and carbon-dated materials found in the shell middens and living sites around the Vineyard including Nashaquitsa Pond.
