= Stonewall Pond =

Salt pond

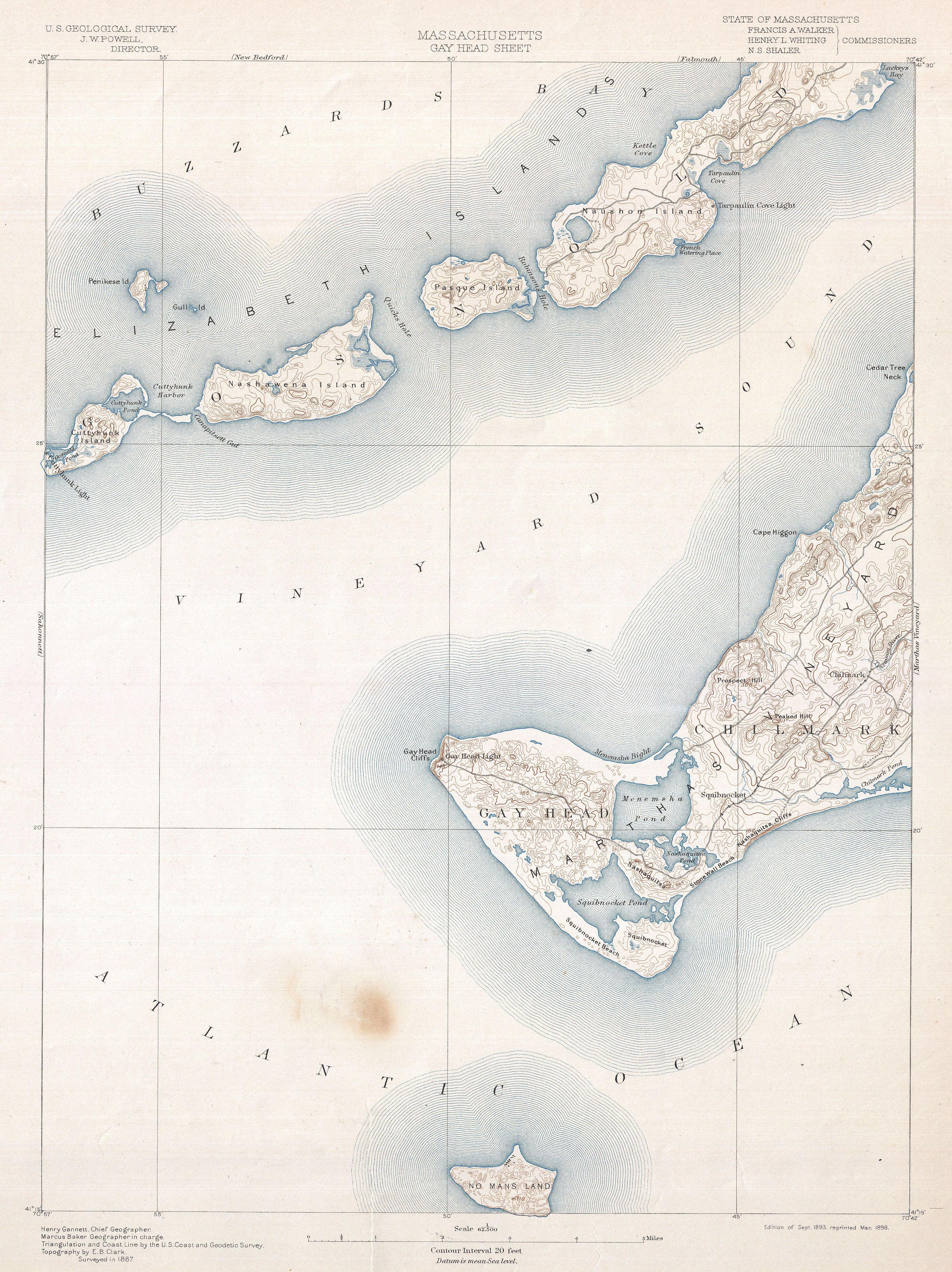

- Location within Massachusetts
- Location: Chilmark, Massachusetts
- Coordinates: 41°19′35″N 70°45′25″W
- Type: Salt Pond
- Basin countries: United States
- Surface area: 30 acres (12 ha)

Stonewall Pond is a salt pond in the town of Chilmark, Massachusetts. Stonewall Pond connects to Menemsha Pond via Nashaquitsa Pond. The beach that separates Stonewall Pond from the Atlantic Ocean is called Stonewall Beach.

== Ecosystem ==
=== History ===
Archeological exploration indicates that indigenous peoples of the Wampanoag tribe have inhabited the shores of Stonewall Pond and the neighboring ponds for approximately 10,000 to 7,500 years. In his 1969 book, Archaeology of Martha's Vineyard, William A Ritchie excavated and carbon-dated materials found in the shell middens and living sites around the Vineyard including Stonewall Pond.

=== Storms ===
It is not uncommon during big storms for the Atlantic Ocean to breach Stonewall Beach and enter the Menemsha Pond ecosystem via Stonewall Pond. In the historic 1938 New England hurricane, the Atlantic Ocean entered the ponds through Stonewall and decimated any buildings near the water, including almost the entire fishing village of Menemsha.

=== Marine life ===
In an early 1990s report by the Martha's Vineyard Commission, Stonewall Pond was observed to host shellfish including soft shell clams, scallops, quahogs, blue crabs, and eels. In this same report, the entire acreage of Stonewall Pond is designated an eelgrass resource.
