= Mainstreams of Modern Art =

1959 book by John Canaday

First edition (publ. Simon & Schuster) Cover art: Pablo Picasso, Girl before a Mirror, 1932 Thomas Eakins, Miss Amelia Van Buren, 1891

Mainstreams of Modern Art: David to Picasso (1959) is a reference book by John Canaday. It comprehensively covers modern art from the start of Romanticism in the 18th century to Cubism and Abstract art in the early 20th century. Mainstreams enjoyed wide commercial and critical success, and was awarded the 1959 Athenaeum Literary Award.

It also contains a ten-page appendix "Notes on Modern Architecture", the final five pages of which are devoted to criticism of Frank Lloyd Wright, whose design Canaday states "have failed disastrously." But in the same sentence, he also praised Wright's buildings as "some of the most beautiful structures of the century bearing his name." This, combined with Canaday's other outspoken views, led a group of artists, collectors, and academics to write a letter to the New York Times in protest.

A revised edition was published shortly before Canaday's death in 1985, and is still required reading at the university level in the United States and worldwide.

== Editions ==
- Canaday, John. Mainstreams of Modern Art. Wadsworth Publishing; 2nd Edition, 1981. ISBN 0-03-057638-5
