= Miss Amelia Van Buren =

Painting by Thomas Eakins

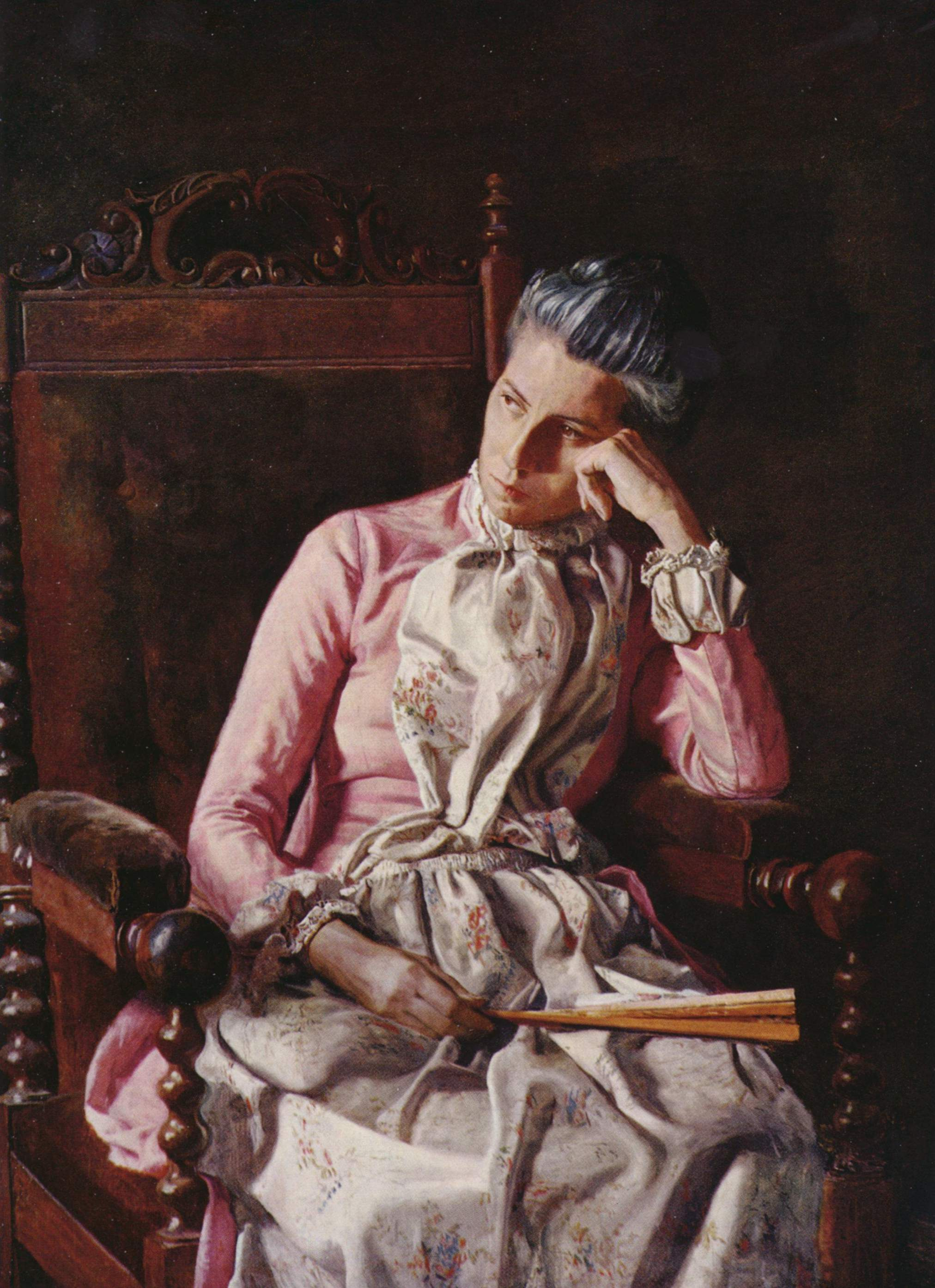
- Artist: Thomas Eakins
- Year: c. 1891
- Medium: Oil on canvas
- Dimensions: 110 cm × 81 cm (45 in × 32 in)
- Location: The Phillips Collection; Washington, D.C.

Miss Amelia Van Buren or Portrait of Amelia C. Van Buren is a c. 1891 painting by the American artist Thomas Eakins (1844–1916), now in The Phillips Collection. It depicts Amelia Van Buren (c. 1856 – 1942), an artist who studied with Eakins, and was called "one of his most gifted pupils." The painting is considered one of Eakins's finest works.

== Background ==
Van Buren studied with Eakins at the Pennsylvania Academy of the Fine Arts in 1884 and 1885. In 1886 Eakins described her as

"a lady of perhaps thirty years or more, and from Detroit[.] She came to the Academy some years ago to study figure painting by which art she hoped to support herself, her parents I believe being dead. I early recognized her as a very capable person. She had a temperament sensitive to color and form, was grave, earnest, thoughtful, and industrious. She soon surpassed her fellows, and I marked her as one I ought to help in every way...."

Eakins's helpfulness included unusual methods: he once disrobed privately for Van Buren in order to demonstrate an anatomical point, an action that he characterized as purely professional. Nevertheless, the story was one of numerous controversial incidents used by Eakins's political adversaries to prompt his dismissal from the Pennsylvania Academy.

After she had ceased studying with Eakins, Van Buren frequently stayed as a guest in his Mount Vernon Street home, and likely posed for the painting during one of her visits to Philadelphia. Although the painting is dated c. 1891, it is also possible that the portrait could have been painted during a long stay with Eakins and his wife from December 6, 1888 to August 12, 1889. Another friend and student of Eakins's, Charles Bregler, later wrote "I recall with pleasure looking on for several hours one afternoon while he (Eakins) was painting in this room that beautiful portrait of Miss Van Buren....No conversation took place, his attention being entirely concentrated on the painting."

Van Buren eventually left painting to devote herself to photography. There exist several photographs of her that have been attributed to Eakins or his circle. She established a Boston marriage with fellow Eakins student Eva Watson.

== Composition ==
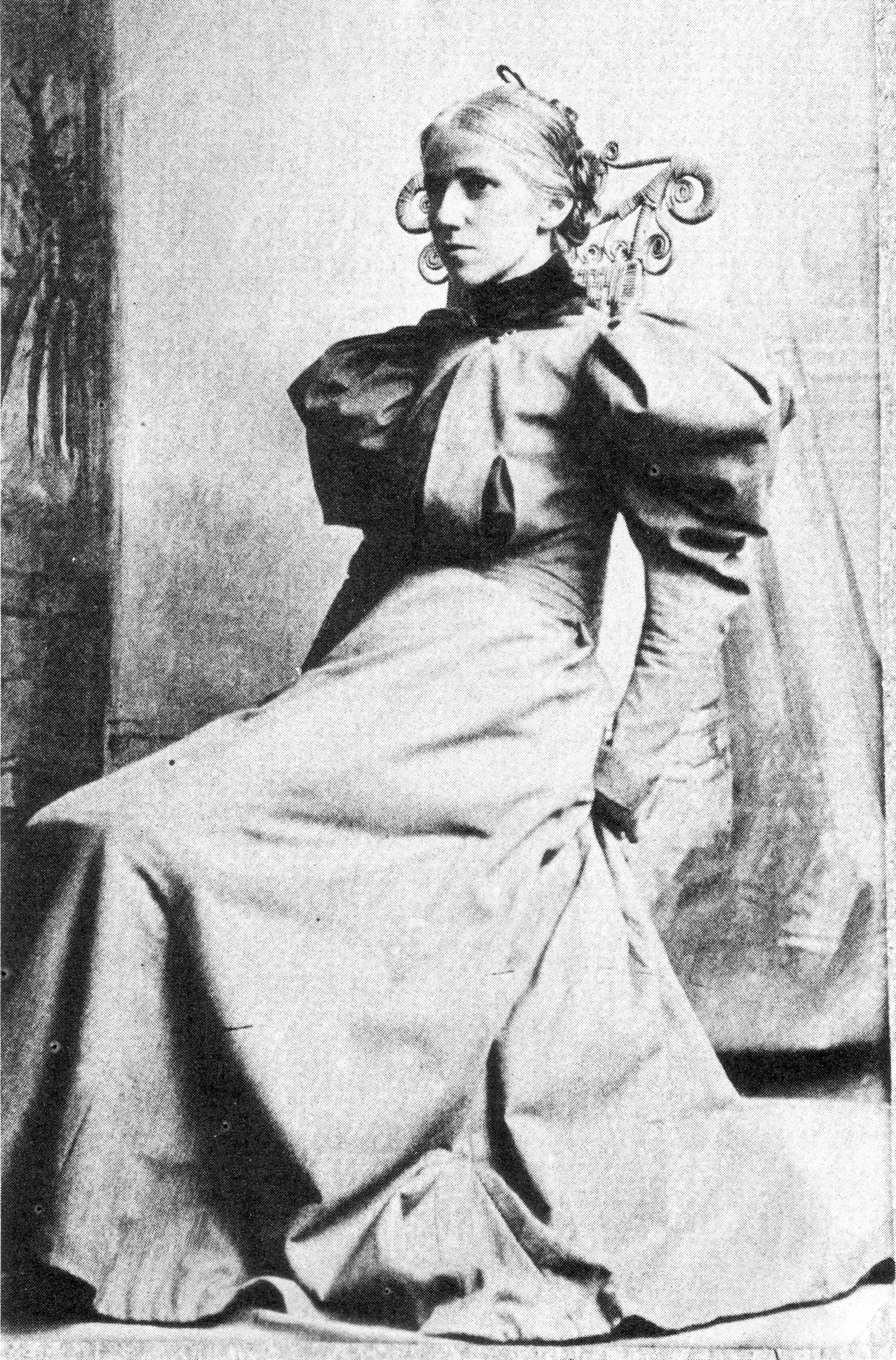
A photograph of Van Buren by Thomas Eakins

Van Buren's seated figure creates a pyramidal composition, activated by the movement of her head, arms, and torso. Her body is illuminated and given sculptural form by a strong shaft of light coming from the left. Her face is thin and serious, her graying hair pulled back, as she supports her head with her left hand, her right hand counterpoised in her lap, holding a fan. For Eakins's biographer John Wilmerding, the contrast between the arms is noteworthy: one arm is solid and "architectural...suggestive of an unspoken potential for great vitality", and "the anchor of the portrait" that belies the otherwise reflective countenance; the other hand is shadowed and limp. She sits in a Jacobean-revival chair, a prop that Eakins often used for his studio portraits. It is selectively detailed, so as to support without distracting from Van Buren's figure. Van Buren's dress contains complex passages, composed in part of broad, brilliant pink forms, and of creased light-colored fabric with floral patterns.

Her body twists "like an overused spring", culminating in the focal point of her head, its anatomical structure exactingly rendered, the broad forehead suggesting the sitter's intellectual presence. She exhibits what one reviewer had already referred to as "an Eakinsish expression", characteristic of his ability to portray "mere thinking without the aid of gesture or attitude." In a letter from his youth, Eakins explained his interest in the:

"higher class[,] the thinking people and feeling ones who always want to see everything [and] to know more".

Van Buren was often unwell, and was diagnosed as having neurasthenia; in 1886 she wrote to Eakins's wife Susan: "I have at last discovered that the trouble with me is in my head it is exhausted by worry or something or other..." The portrait seems to indicate as much. Touching on the picture's melancholy, John Updike referred to the painting when he wrote "Discomfort and a grieving inwardness distinguish the best of his (Eakins's) many portraits." The sense of weariness has been interpreted also as a projection of Eakins's personality, especially in the wake of his professional difficulties. As a psychological study, it has been noted that such a profound rendering of a former student is unusual, and that the painting may be seen as a sort of self-portrait.

== Reception ==
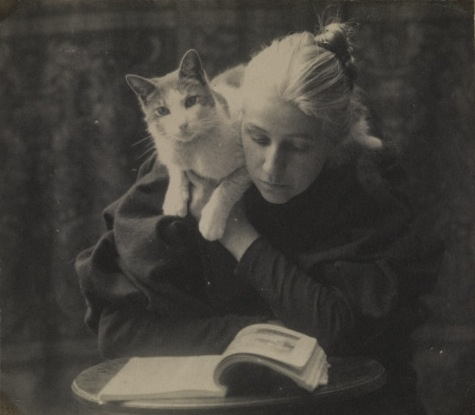
Attributed to Thomas Eakins, a photograph of Amelia C. Van Buren with a cat, c. late 1880s–1891

Miss Amelia Van Buren was only the second portrait of a woman from outside his family that Eakins showed publicly; at neither the Philadelphia prelude to the World's Columbian Exposition nor subsequently in Chicago did it receive much mention in the press. More recent praise has been unqualified. William Innes Homer has called it "superb', and written that "Such a painting can hold its own against the best work of any of Eakins's contemporaries, no matter what their country of origin." For John Canaday, it was "the finest of all American portraits."

== Provenance ==
The painting came into Van Buren's possession, possibly as a gift from the artist, by 1893. In 1927 the Phillips Memorial Gallery purchased it from Van Buren.

== See also ==
- List of works by Thomas Eakins
