= People of Chilmark =

1920 painting by Thomas Hart Benton

- Figure Composition
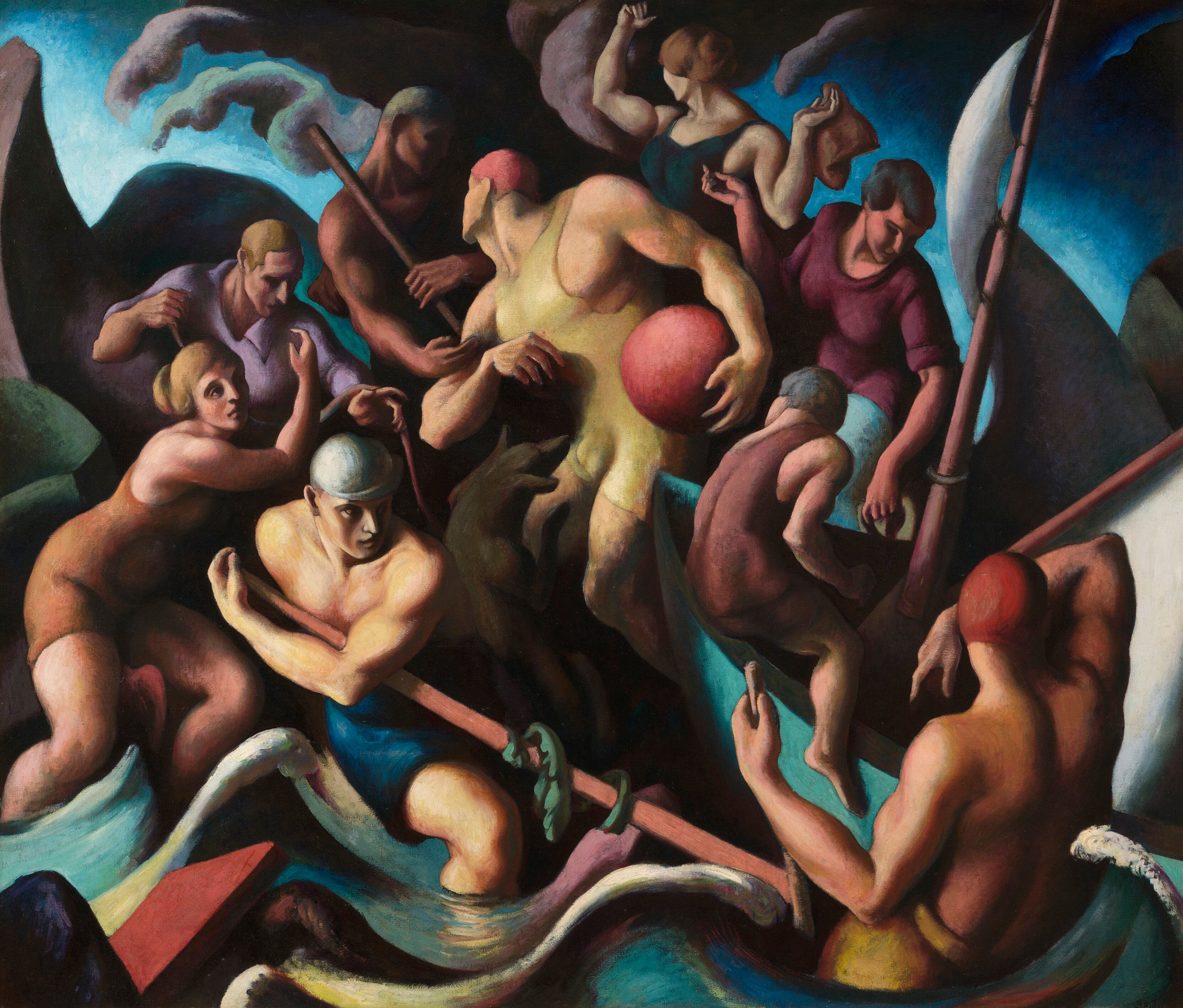
- Artist: Thomas Hart Benton
- Year: 1920
- Medium: Oil on canvas
- Dimensions: 166.5 cm × 197.3 cm (65.6 in × 77.7 in)
- Location: Hirshhorn Museum, Washington, D.C.

People of Chilmark is a social realism 1920 painting by Thomas Hart Benton. The painting is inspired by Renaissance and mannerist compositions and their chiaroscuro.

Benton first spent the summer of 1920 in the village of Chilmark, Massachusetts in Martha's Vineyard, later serving as the basis of this work. Benton was a regionalist painter who typically depicted everyday people in farm or rural settings.

== Title ==
Benton originally titled the painting Figure Composition. The title People of Chilmark was given later due to its subject matter. Benton was reluctant to give his works titles that would point to a narrative subject matter, preferring generic names.

== Description ==
The painting shows a group of nine of Benton's contemporary Americans in swimwear at a beach. People depicted include his wife, his brother-in-law, his neighbor, and his close friend Thomas Craven, who is in the top left corner.

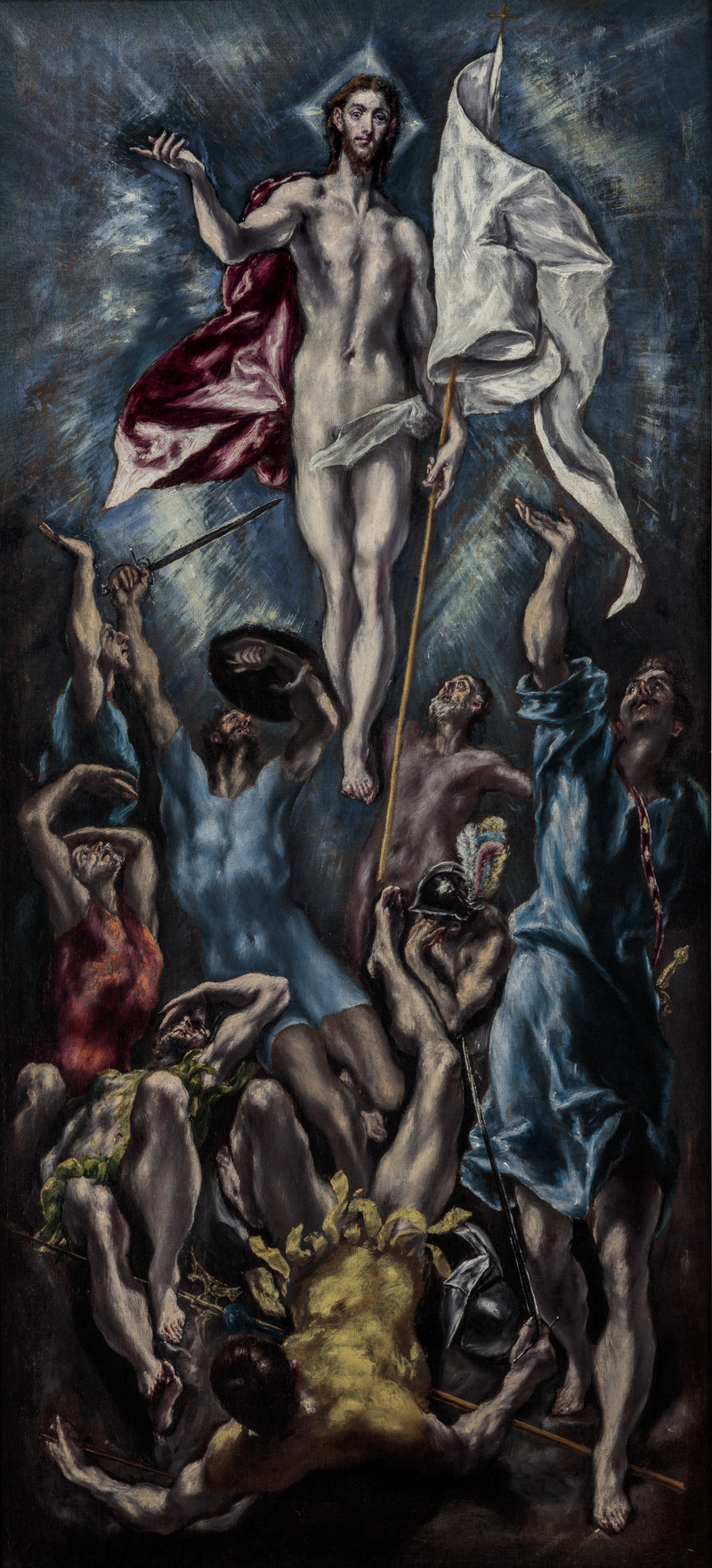
El Greco's early 17th century Resurrection, a possible inspiration for the People of Chilmark

In the top center, the painting depicts the first Black man to be in Benton's works. This may be another reference to Old Master paintings, where a singular Black figure appears in a pivotal role in the composition. His face is partially in shadow, as he holds a long pole that draws attention to him through the composition. The swirling composition is supposed to be a reference to his studies on Renaissance art.

== Analysis ==
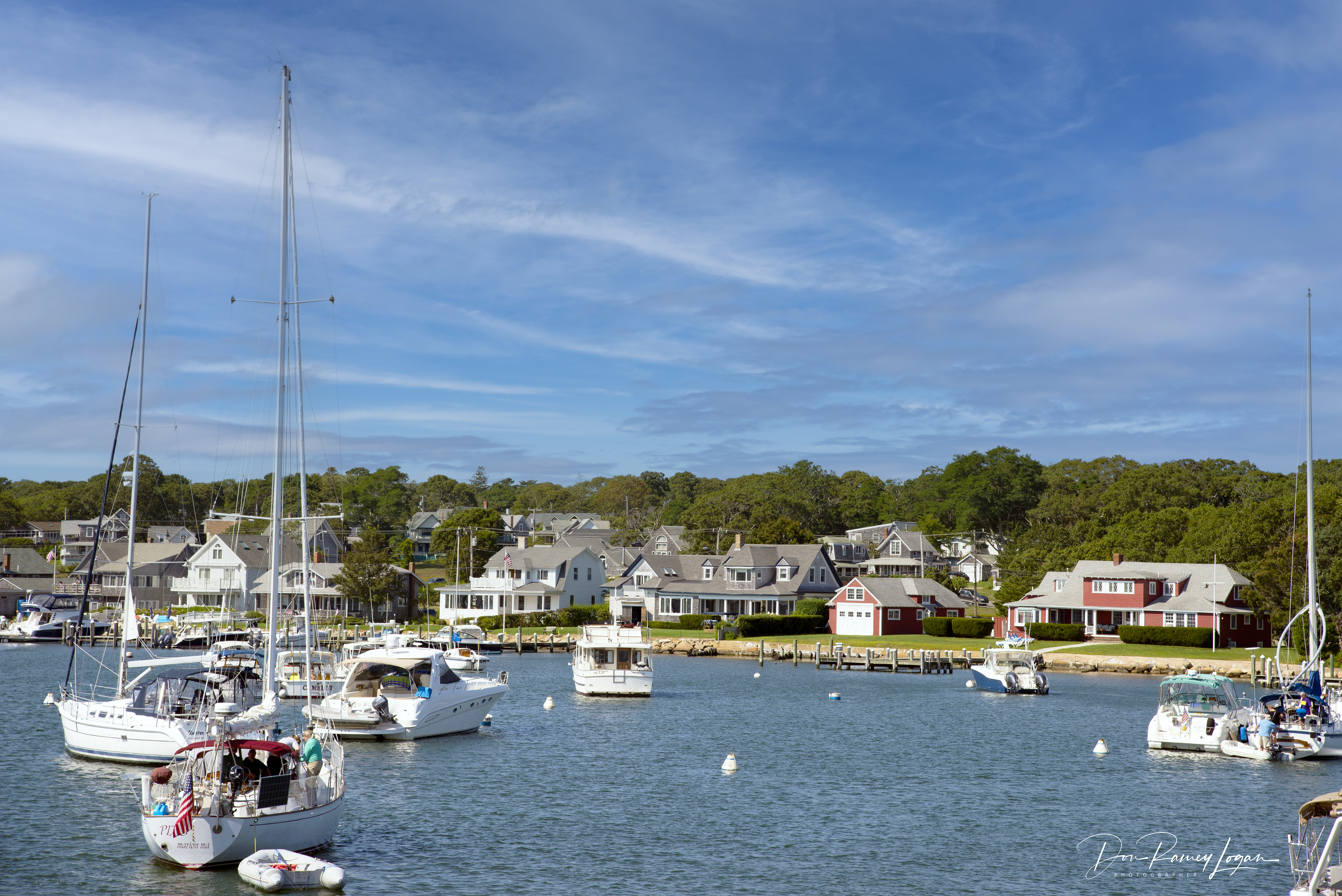
A beach in Martha's Vineyard, the setting of the painting

The painting may be a reference to El Greco's Resurrection. In both paintings, the viewer's eye must circle the painting in search of a focus point. Whereas El Greco guides the eye through color on the figures' robes, Benton's likewise uses color on the figures' swimwear and caps.

The painting's complete lack of abstraction is in contrast to his contemporary modernists, whom Benton strongly disliked.

== Reception ==
In a 1972 review published by the New York Times, art critic John Canaday said of the painting:

There is a bit of everything here with Gericault's 'Raft of the Medusa' as one limit and Raphael's 'Fire in the Borgo' as the other. It is so typical an academic machine that you can all but hear the wheels grinding. Yet it is the dividing line beyond which Tom becomes an original painter. And in its scheme, if you reduce it to a diagram, it is also as proto-Pollock as any pictorial composition you can find anywhere.
