= List of Massachusetts placenames of Native American origin =

The following list includes settlements, geographic features, and political subdivisions of Massachusetts whose names are derived from Native American languages.

== Listings ==
=== State ===
- Massachusetts – from an Algonquian language of southern New England, and apparently means "near the small big mountain", usually identified as Great Blue Hill on the border of Milton and Canton, Massachusetts (cf. the Narragansett name Massachusêuck).

=== Counties ===
- The Town and County of Nantucket: (Wampanoag) "place of peace"; (Naragansett) far off, among the waves

=== Settlements ===
- Acoaxet: (Narragansett) "at the fishing promontory" or "place of small pines"
- Agawam: (Nipmuck or Pennacook) "low land" (with water) or "place to unload canoes" (possible portage spot)
- Annisquam (and river)
- Assinippi: (Wampanoag) "rocks in water"
- Assonet River (also Cedar Swamp and village): (Narragansett) "at the rock" – the rock in question being Dighton Rock
- Aquinnah
- Cataumet: (Wampanoag) "at the ocean" or "landing place"
- Chicopee (also falls, and river): (Nipmuck) "violent water"
- Cochituate: (Natick) "place of swift water"
- Cohasset: (Natick) "long rocky place"
- Cotuit: (Wampanoag) "long planting field"
- Cummaquid: (Wampanoag) "harbor"
- Hockanum: (Podunk) "hook"
- Humarock: (Wampanoag) "shell place" or "rock carving"
- Hyannis: (Wampanoag) name of a 17th-century chief, "Iyanogh's"
- Jamaica Plain (and pond): (Natick) "beaver"
- Manomet (and point): (Wampanoag) "portage place"
- Mashpee: (Wampamoag) "place near great cove"
- Mattapan: (Natick) "resting place" or "end of portage"
- Mattapoisett: (Wampanoag) "resting place" or "edge of cove"
- Merrimac: (Pennacook) "deep place"
- Minnechaug: (Algonquian) "Land of Berries"
- Nabnasset: (Nipmuck)
- Nahant: (Natick) "the point" or "almost an island"
- Natick: tribe; "the place I seek" or "home," "place," "clearing"
- Neponset
- Nonquitt: (Narragansett) "dry or landing place"
- Pocasset: (Natick) "where the stream widens"
- Pontoosuc: (Mahican or Nipmuck) "falls on the brook"
- Quissett: (Nipmuck) "at the place of small pines"
- Sagamore: (Wampanoag) "chief"
- Santuit: (Wampanoag) "cool water place"
- Saugus: (Natick) "outlet"
- Scituate: (Wampanoag) "at the cold spring or brook"
- Seekonk: (Narragansett) "wild black goose" or (Wampanoag) "mouth of stream" or "wild goose"
- Siasconset: (Narragansett) "at the place of many/great bones" (whales?)
- Swampscott: (Natick) "place of red rocks"
- Waquoit: (Wampanoag) "at the end"
- Wianno
- Wombemessock: (Nipmuc) "place of chestnuts" or "place of small white fruit"
- Woronoco: (Nipmuck) "winding about"

=== Bodies of water ===
- Acushnet River (and town): (Naragansett) "at the cove"
- Assabet River: (Nipmuck) "at the boggy place"
- Assawompset Pond: Narragansett "trading place"; (Wampanoag) "place of large upright rock"
- Lake Chaubunagungamaug: (Nipmuck-Mohegan) "boundary fishing place"
- Chappaquiddick Island: (Wampanoag) "separated island"
- Congamond Lake (on Connecticut border – Congamuck Ponds): (Nipmuck) "long fishing place"
- Cuttyhunk: (Wampanoag) "thing that lies out in the sea"
- Gansett Harbor
- Mount Greylock: named for a Missisquoi chief
- Hockomock Swamp: (Natick-Abnaki) "evil spirit" or "hellish place"; (Narragansett) "hook-shaped place"
- Hoosac Tunnel: (Mahican) "rock place"
- Housatonic River From the Mohican phrase "usi-a-di-en-uk", translated as "beyond the mountain place"
- Manhan River: (Nipmuck) "island"
- Megansett Harbor
- Merrimack River: (Abnaki) "at the deep place"
- Mishaum Point: (Narragansett) "great neck" or "canoe-landing place"
- Lake Monomonac (NH border): (Abnaki) "at the very deep place"
- Monatiquot River (Massachusett) "a lookout-out place"
- Monomoy Island (and point): (Wampanoag) "look-out place" or "deep water"
- Muskeget Island (and channel): (Wampanoag) "grassy place"
- Mystic River: (Natick) "great tidal stream"
- Nagog Pond: Concord water supply located in Acton
- Nantasket Beach: (Natick/Wampanoag) "at the strait" or "low-tide place"
- Nashawena Island: (Wampanoag) "between"
- Nashoba Brook
- Naushon Island: (Wampanoag) "middle" (no clear translation)
- Nemasket River: (Wampanoag) "place where the fish are"
- Neponset River: (Natick) possibly "a good fall" (easy for canoe travel)
- Nonamesset Island: (Wampanoag)
- Nissitissit: (Nipmuc) "two brooks" or "between two brooks"
- Onota Lake: (Mahican) "blue/deep"
- Pasque Island
- Penikese Island
- Punkatasset Hill (Algonquian)
- Quabbin Reservoir: (Nipmuck) "crooked streams"
- Quaboag River: (Nipmuck) "before the pond" or abbreviation of "red pond" (m'squ'boag)
- Quinebaug River: (Nipmuck) "long pond"
- Lake Quinsigamond: (Nipmuck) "pickerel-fishing place
- Segreganset River: (Narragansett) "place of hard rocks"
- Shawmut Peninsula: (Algonquian) "ferry" or "place to draw up canoes"
- Snipatuit Pond: (Wampanoag) "at the rocky river"
- Squannacook River: (Nipmuc) "place for taking salmon"
- Squibnocket Point (and pond): (Wampanoag) "at the place of dark rocks" (or clay cliff)
- Taconic Mountains: (Natick) "steep ascent"
- Tuckernuck Island: (Wampanoag) "round loaf of bread"
- Uncatena Island
- Mount Wachusett (and reservoir): (Natick) "near the mountain"
- Mount Watatic: (Nipmuck)
- Watuppa Ponds: (Wampanoag) "roots"
- Weepecket Islands
- Weweantic River: (Wampanoag) "crooked" or "wandering stream"

=== Other ===
- Great Sippewissett Marsh
- Succanessett Point
- Tantiusques: (Nipmuck) "black stuff between the hills"

== See also ==
- List of place names in the United States of Native American origin
