= Squibnocket Pond =

Salt pond

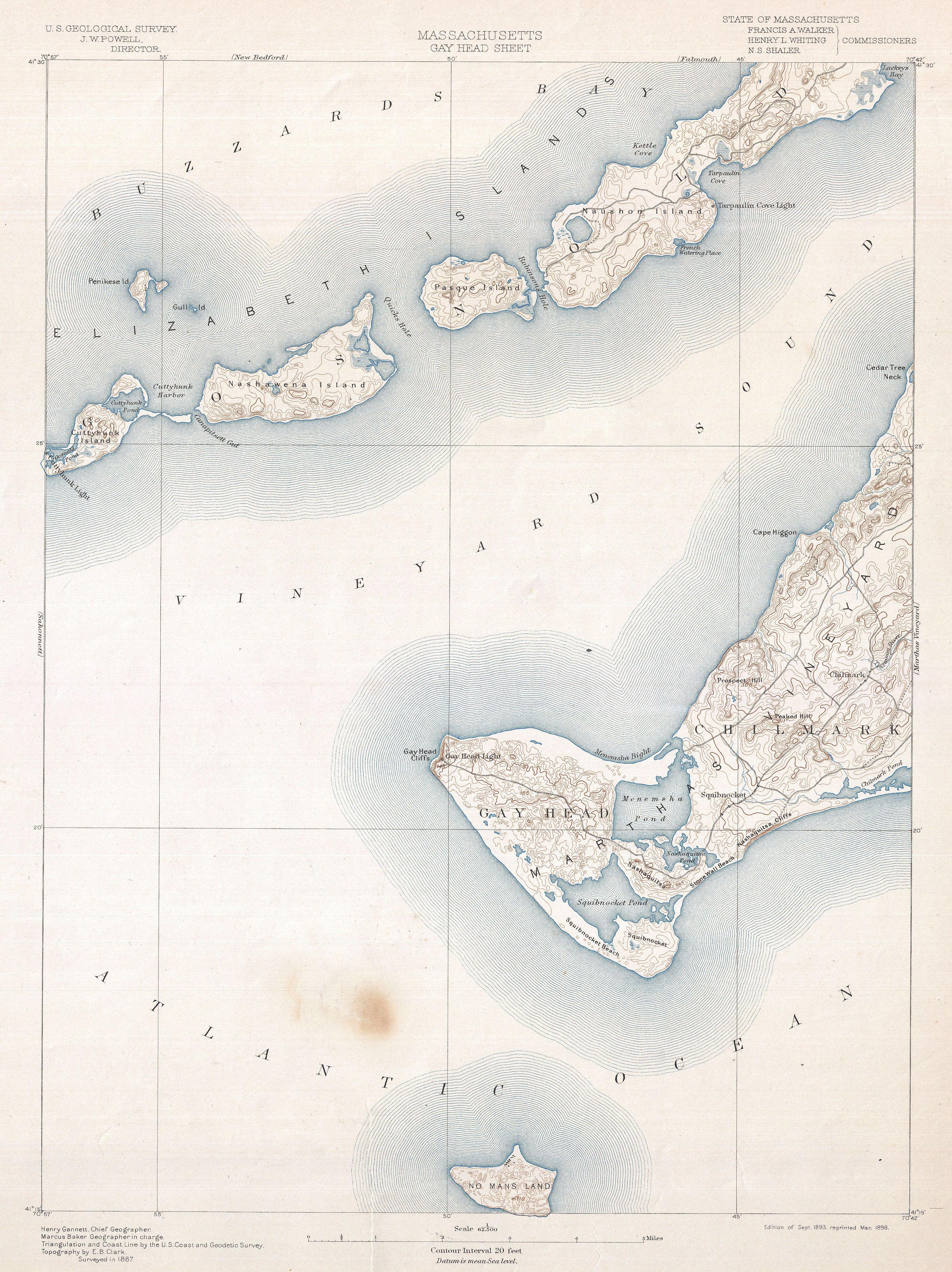

- Location within Massachusetts
- Location: Chilmark, Massachusetts & Aquinnah, Massachusetts
- Coordinates: 41°19′N 70°47′W
- Type: Salt Pond
- Basin countries: United States

Squibnocket Pond is a salt pond split between the towns of Chilmark, Massachusetts and Aquinnah, Massachusetts. Squibnocket Pond connects to Menemsha Pond via Herring Creek.

== History ==
Archeological exploration indicates that indigenous peoples of the Wampanoag tribe have inhabited the shores of Squibnocket and the neighboring ponds for approximately 10,000 to 7,500 years. In his 1969 book, Archaeology of Martha's Vineyard, William A Ritchie excavated and carbon-dated materials found in the shell middens and living sites around the Vineyard including Squibnocket Pond.

=== Herring Creek ===
Herring creek is a historical herring run, fished by the Wampanoag peoples since time immemorial. The Blueback Herring and Alewife swim from the Atlantic Ocean into Menemsha Pond through the Herring Creek herring run and into Squibnocket Pond where they will spawn, usually beginning in mid March into June. The Herring Creek is owned and maintained by the Wampanoag Tribe of Gay Head with facilities that include a herring camera live feed and a hatchery.
