= Squibnocket Ridge =

- Location within Massachusetts Location within the United States

Highest point
- Elevation: 66 ft (20 m)
- Coordinates: 41°18′30″N 70°46′28″W

Geography
- Location: Martha's Vineyard, Massachusetts
- Topo map: USGS Sqibnocket

Squibnocket Ridge is a hill in Dukes County, Massachusetts. It is located on Martha's Vineyard 2.8 miles (4.5 km) southwest of Chilmark in the Town of Chilmark. Peaked Hill is located northeast of Squibnocket Ridge.
