= Amelia Van Buren =

American photographer

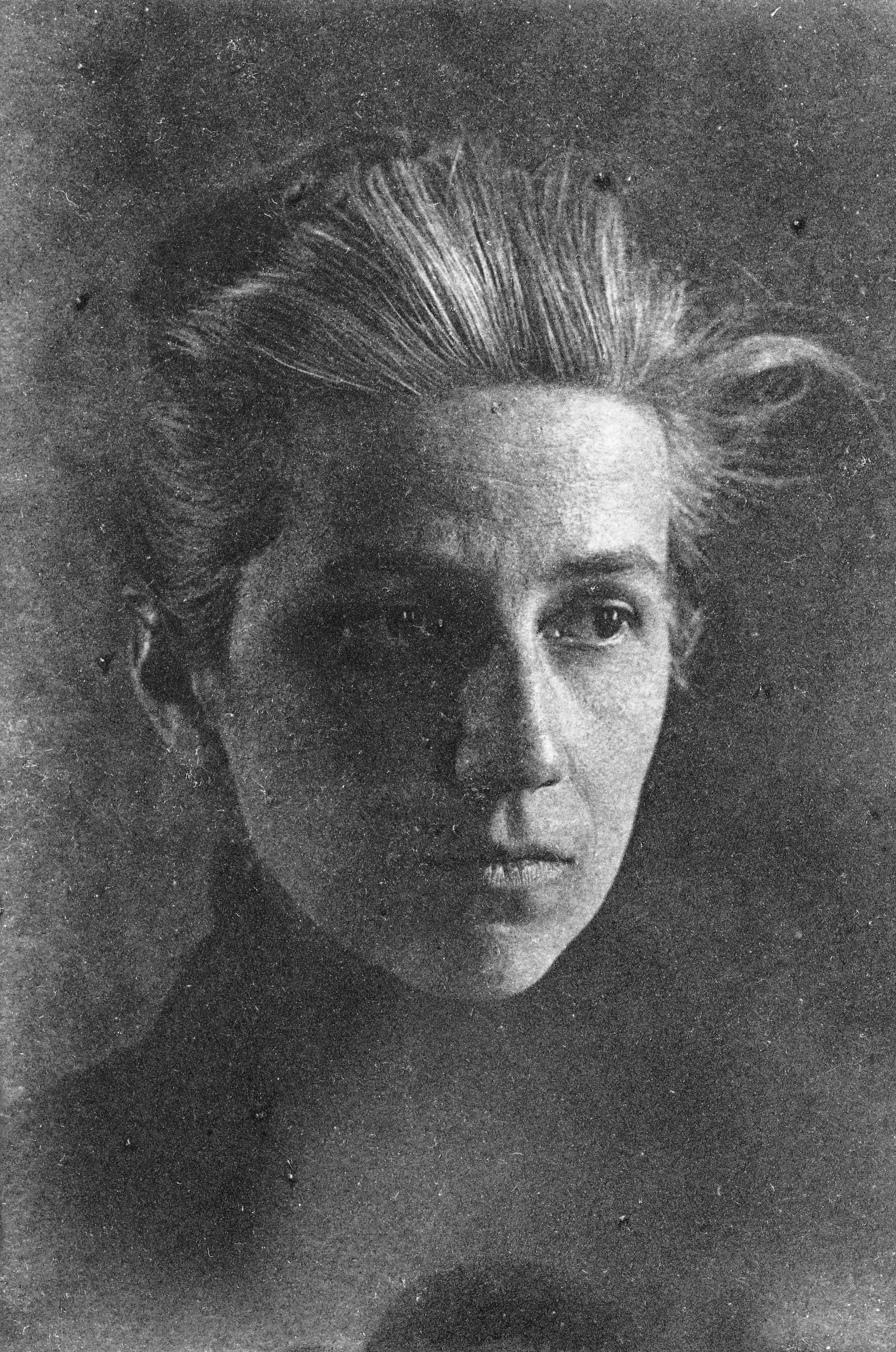
- Van Buren, c. 1891
- Born: c. 1856; Detroit, Michigan
- Died: 1942; Tryon, North Carolina
- Resting place: Tryon Cemetery, Tryon, North Carolina

Amelia Culver Van Buren (c. 1856 (Note: Records of Van Buren's life vary regarding her year of birth. Her tombstone says 1854, but this cannot be correct because her family's listing in the 1855 New York State census (taken in June that year) does not include her. Her nearest sibling, Caroline, is recorded as 1 year old. The 1860 census lists Caroline as 6 years old and Van Buren as 3 years old. This, along with the censuses for 1870 and 1900, which record she was born in about 1856, the 1880 census that records she was born about 1858, and the fact that she graduated from high school in June 1874, make the last half of 1856 or the first half of 1857 the most likely window for her birth.) – 21 Jan 1942) was an American photographer. A noted portrait photographer, she was a student of Thomas Eakins, and the subject of his c. 1891 painting Miss Amelia Van Buren, regarded as one of his finest works.

== Pennsylvania Academy of the Fine Arts ==
Van Buren was born in Detroit, Michigan. In 1884, she began attending the Pennsylvania Academy of the Fine Arts. She had already been exhibiting her artwork in Detroit for at least four years prior to attending the Academy.

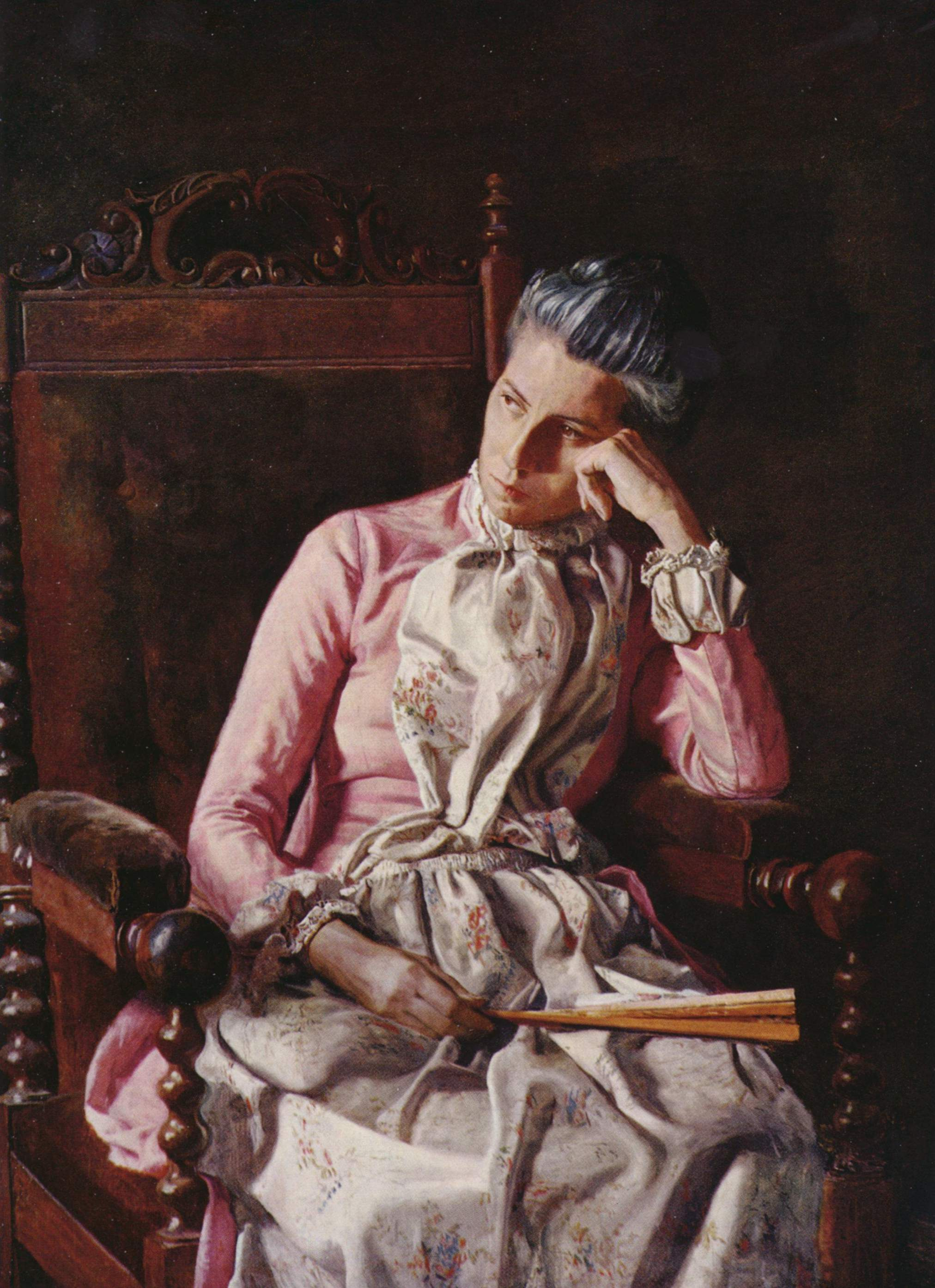
Miss Amelia Van Buren by Thomas Eakins, c. 1891

Her talent soon led Eakins to tutor her personally, including controversial lessons using nude models, male and female. In 1885–86, several of Eakins's former art students (including Thomas Pollock Anshutz and Colin Campbell Cooper) conspired to have Eakins fired from the Pennsylvania Academy of Fine Arts. They approached the Academy's Committee on Instruction and made numerous charges against Eakins. They alleged that Eakins had used female students, including Van Buren, as nude models. Another highly inflammatory charge was that Van Buren had asked Eakins a question regarding pelvic movements, which Eakins answered by removing his pants and demonstrating the movements. He later insisted that the episode was entirely professional. The committee left Eakins under the impression that the charges had been filed by Van Buren, who had moved to Detroit to recover from neurasthenia. That, however, was not the case, as she greatly respected Eakins and, in years to come, would defend him at every opportunity and express pride in owning pieces of his artwork.

After recovering, Van Buren returned to Philadelphia, where she continued her studies under Eakins at the Art Students' League of Philadelphia. Van Buren and Eakins stayed in close contact for a number of years afterward. Three or four years after his dismissal, Eakins painted Van Buren in Miss Amelia Van Buren.

== Post-Academy ==
There is little information on Van Buren's life and professional career following her education at the Academy. No paintings by Van Buren are known to survive.

She entered into a Boston marriage with fellow student Eva Watson-Schütze. The two of them opened a studio and art gallery in Atlantic City, New Jersey, but Van Buren disliked having to compromise her aesthetic sense to sell paintings, so she turned to photography instead. Both women were recognized as accomplished artists and exhibited together at the Camera Club of Pittsburgh in 1899, and Van Buren was noted for her portraits, once declaring her goal was to make portraits "to stand with [those of] Sargent and Watts and the other masters".

It is known that by 1900, when she sent some prints to Frances Benjamin Johnston, she had moved back to Detroit. She had the portrait of herself in her possession, likely a gift from the artist himself, which she sold to the Phillips Memorial Gallery in 1927, by which time she was living in North Carolina.

In the early 1930s, Lloyd Goodrich, who was writing the first full-length biography of Eakins, wrote to Van Buren. However, she replied that she had no particular reminiscences of Eakins. Goodrich considered this odd, although her reaction makes more sense in light of recent scholarship on Eakins's predatory, voyeuristic, and exhibitionist behavior -- at least some of which he admitted subjecting Van Buren to when she was his student.

Van Buren spent her later years in an artists' colony in Tryon, North Carolina, where she died in 1942.

== Works by Van Buren ==
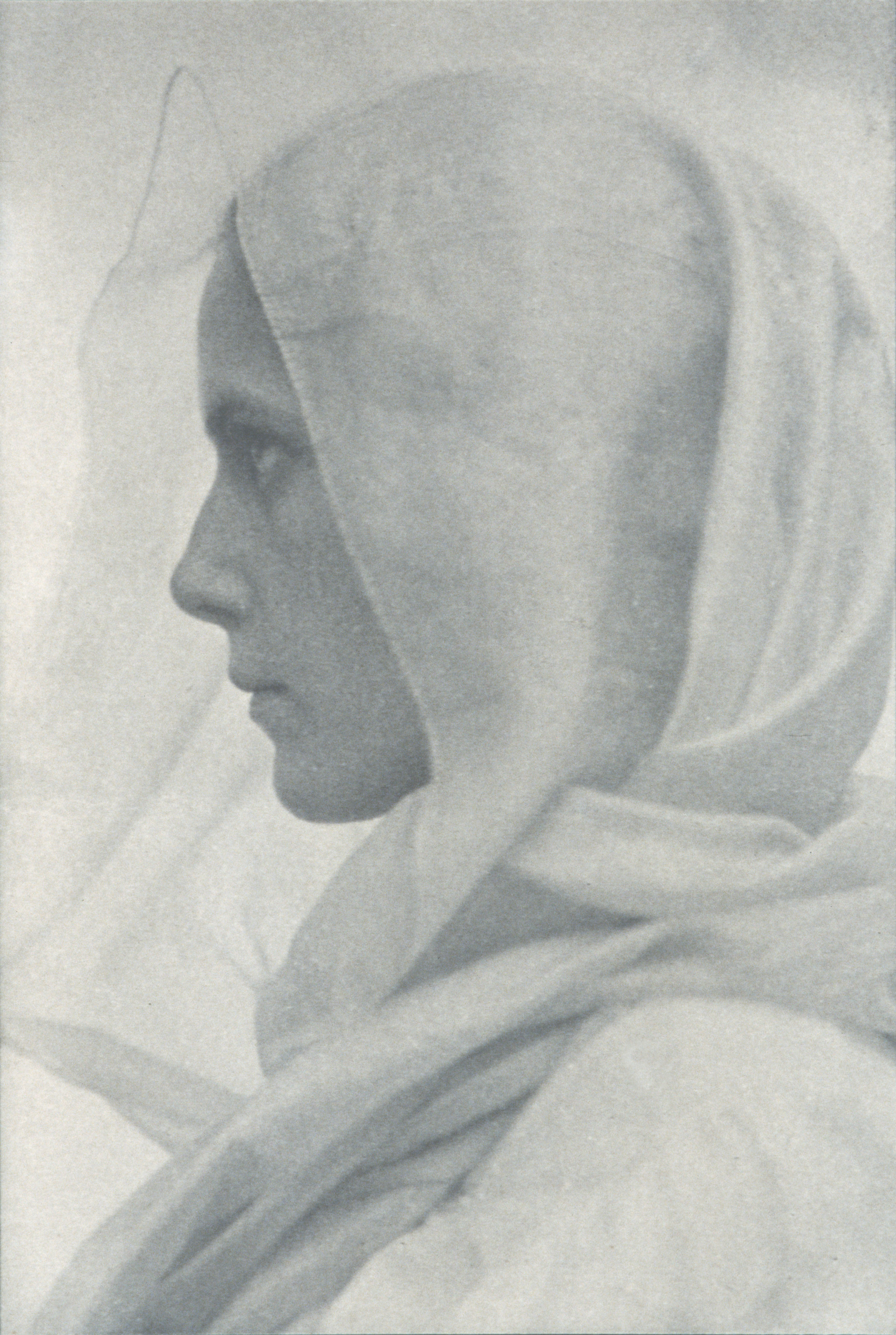
Study of a head, c. 1900

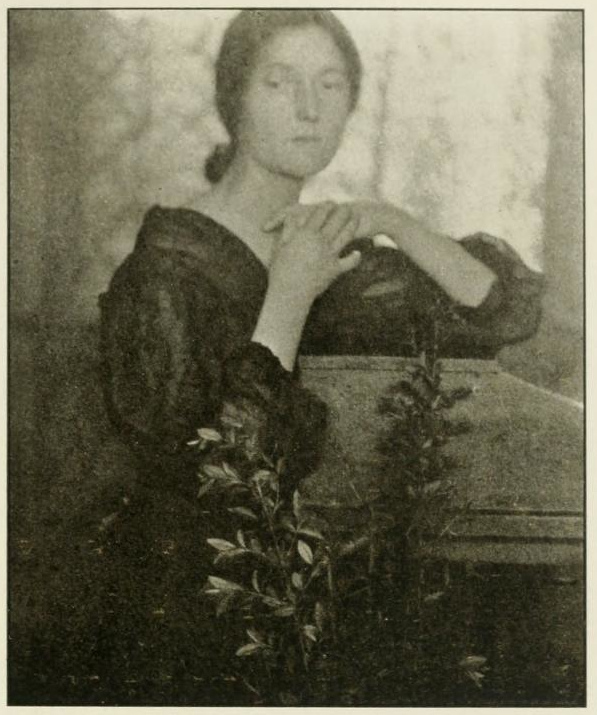
Isabella, c. 1903

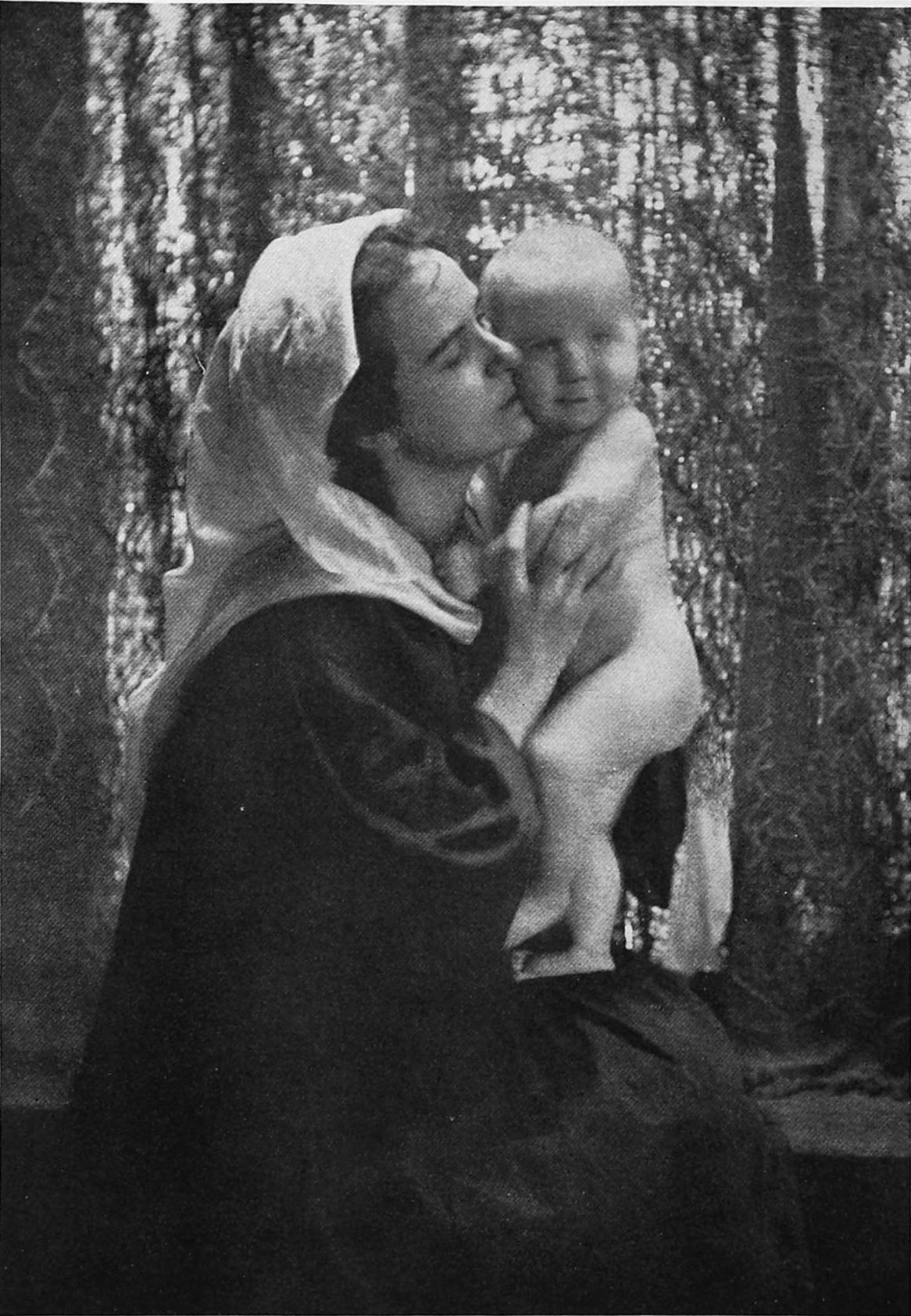
Mother and Child, c. 1901

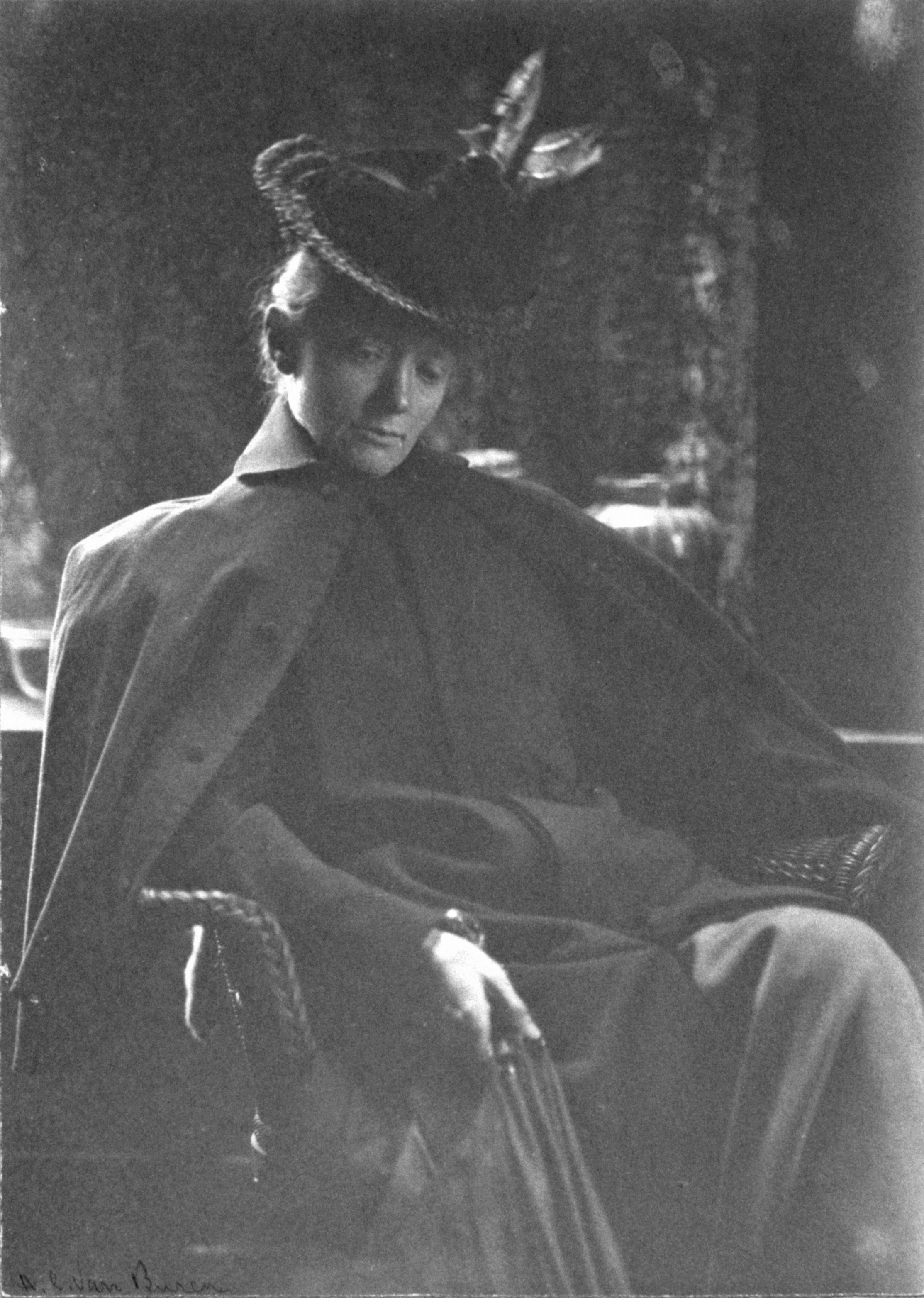
A Rainy Day c.1900

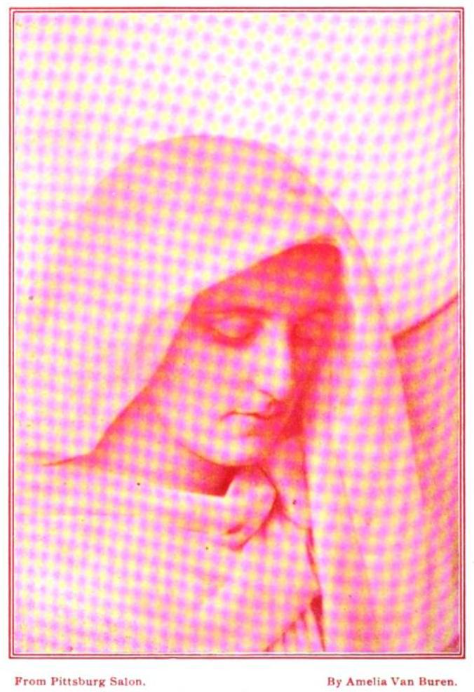
The Shield of Achilles c.1899

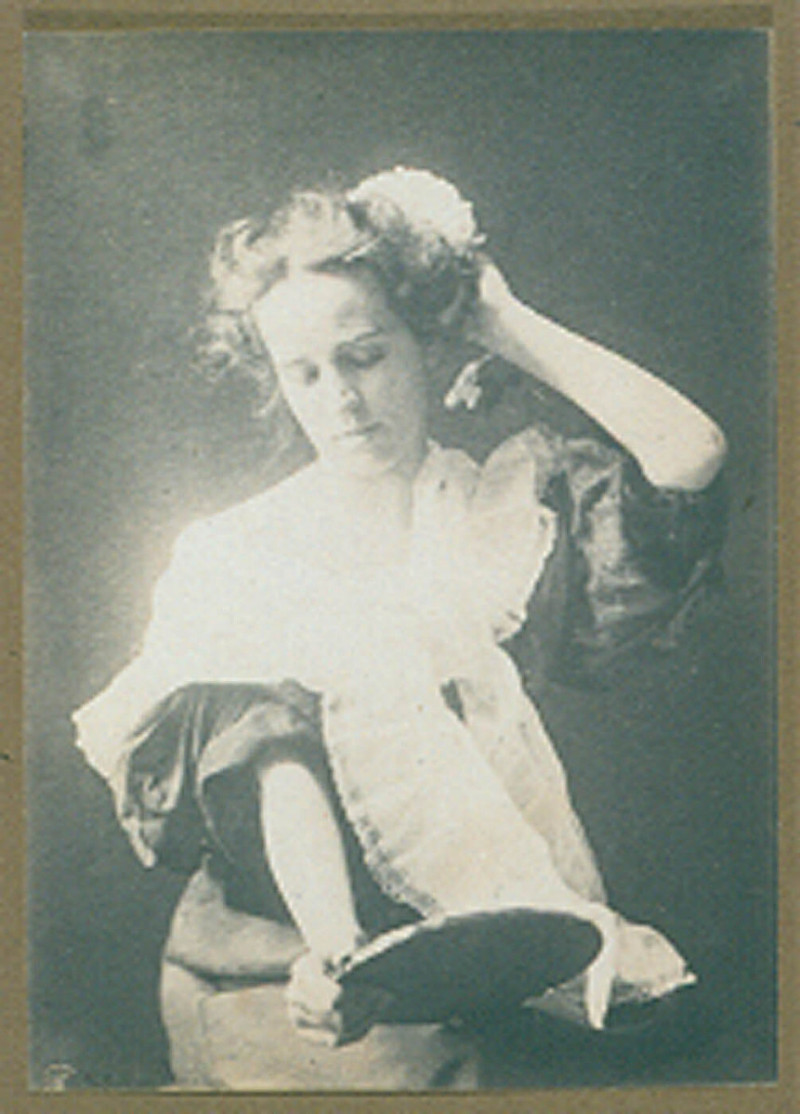
Woman looking at herself in a mirror held in her lap c.1900

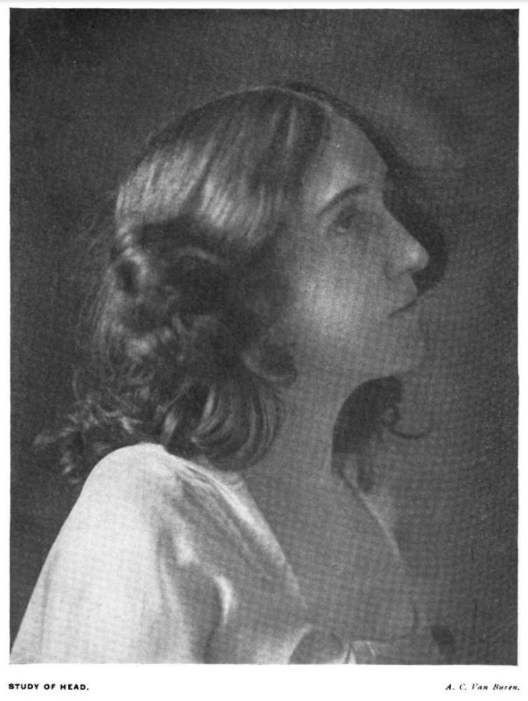
Study of a Head c.1900

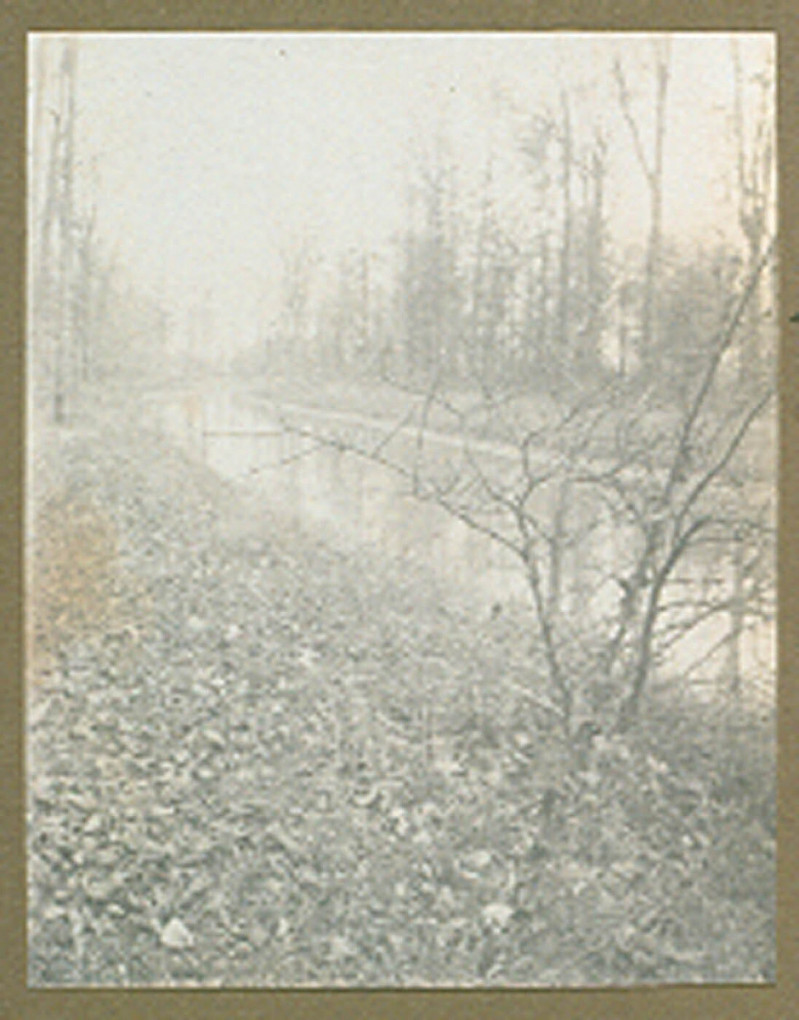
Autumn landscape on a cana, or river lined with trees c.1900

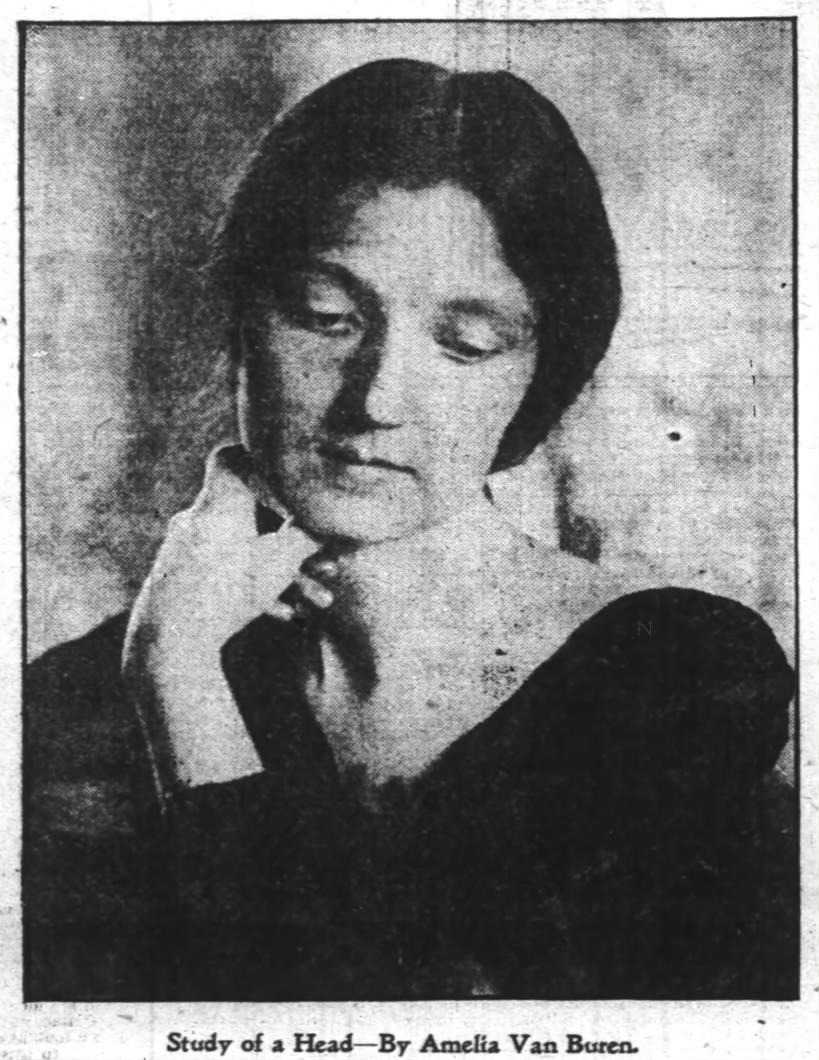
Study of a Head c.1902

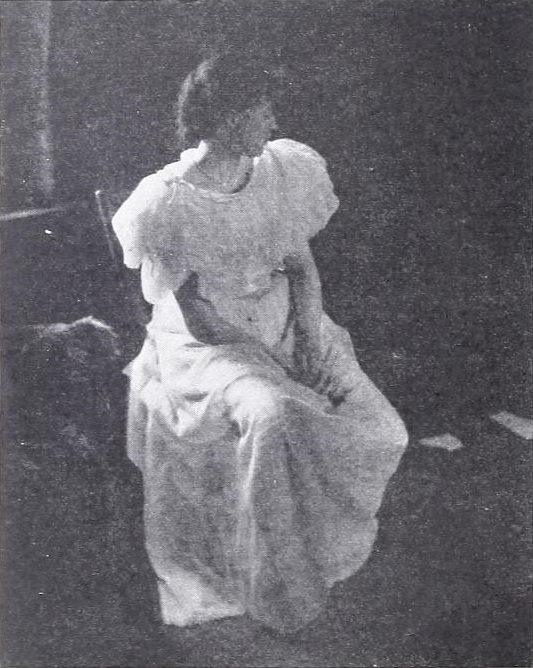
Portrait of a woman in a dress, c. 1900
