= Menemsha, Massachusetts =

Village in Massachusetts, United States

Coordinates: 41°21′09″N 70°45′55″W

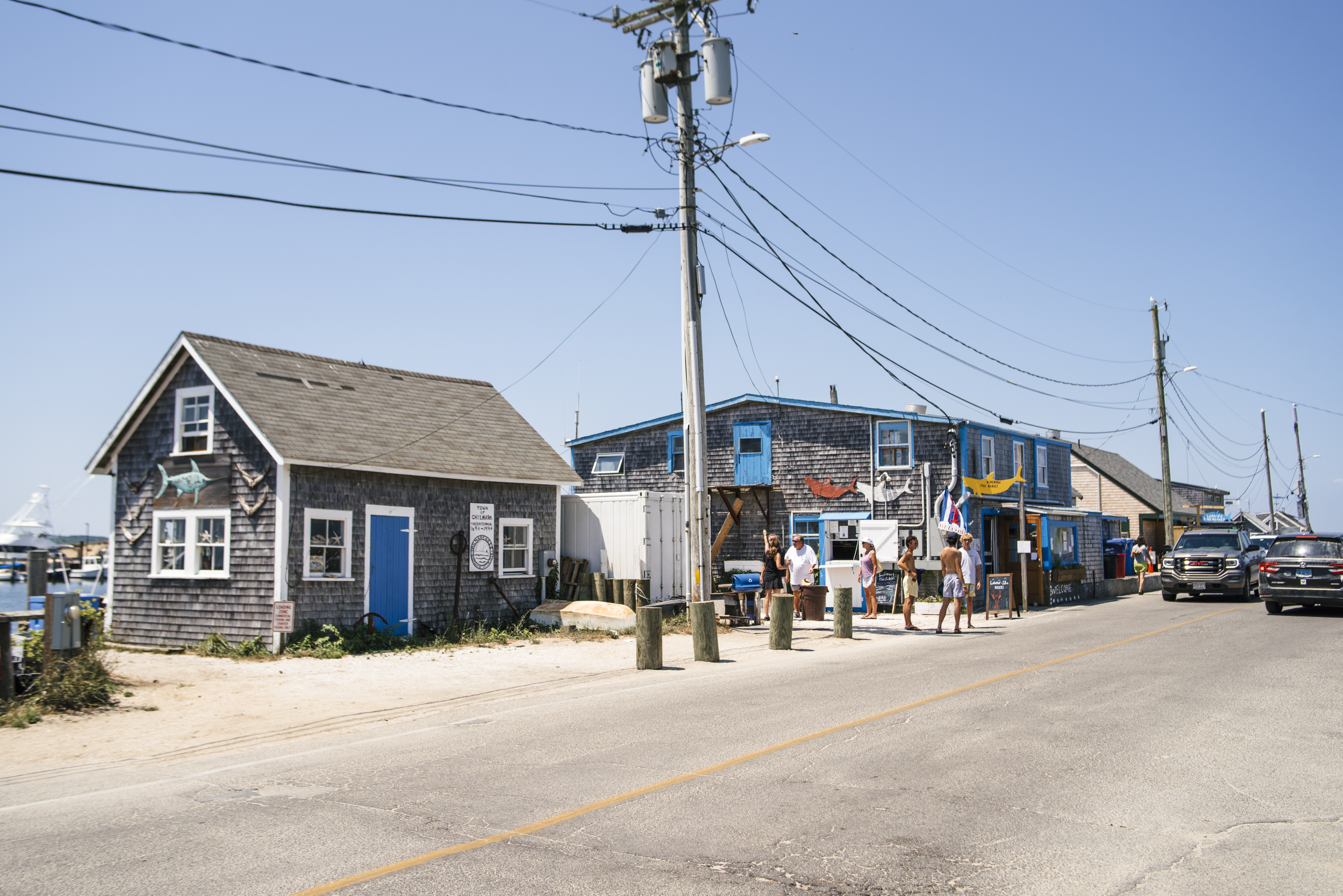
The fishing village of Menemsha

Menemsha (/məˈnɛmʃə/ muh-NEM-shuh) is a small fishing village located in the town of Chilmark on Martha's Vineyard in Massachusetts. It is on the eastern coast of Menemsha Pond, adjacent to the opening into the Vineyard Sound on the pond's northern end. The village's historic harbor serves as the point of departure for local fishermen, some from multi-generational fishing families, as well as charter boats to the Elizabeth Islands and elsewhere. Besides charter fishing and cruises, other amenities are the public beach adjacent to the harbor and the bicycle ferry across Menemsha Pond to Aquinnah. Menemsha is the location of a United States Coast Guard station, Coast Guard Station Menemsha, and was once known as Menemsha Creek.

It was the shooting background for the fictional "Amity Island" of Steven Spielberg's 1975 film Jaws.

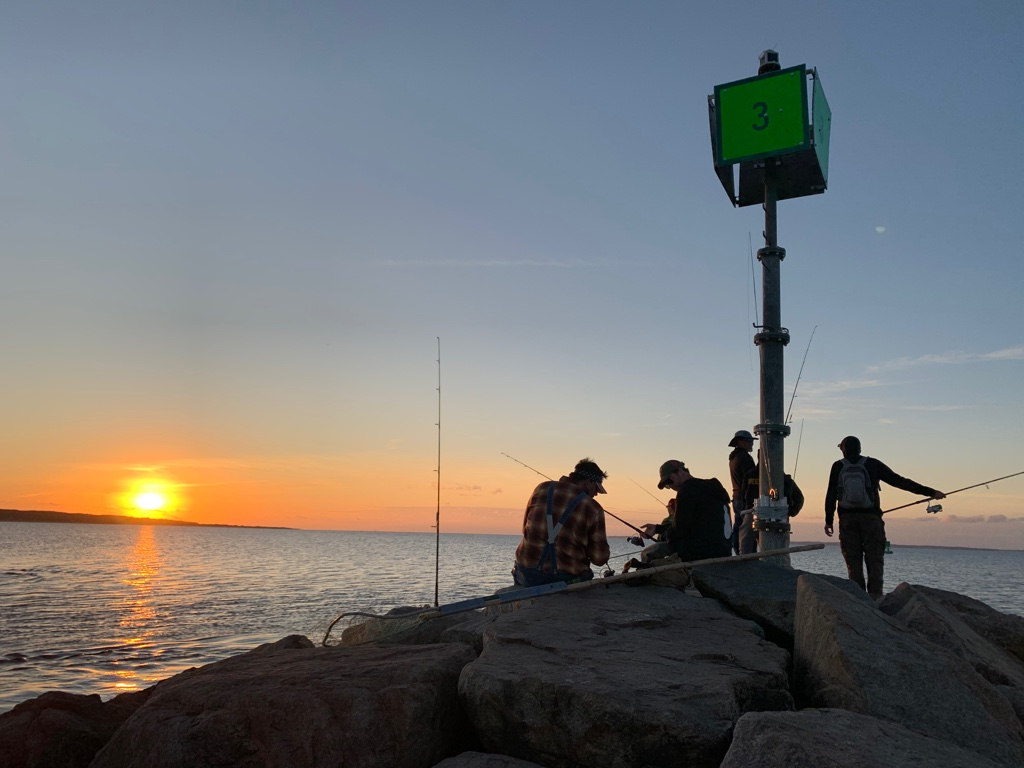
Sunset at Menemsha Harbor
