= Eva Watson-Schütze =

American photographer (1867–1935)

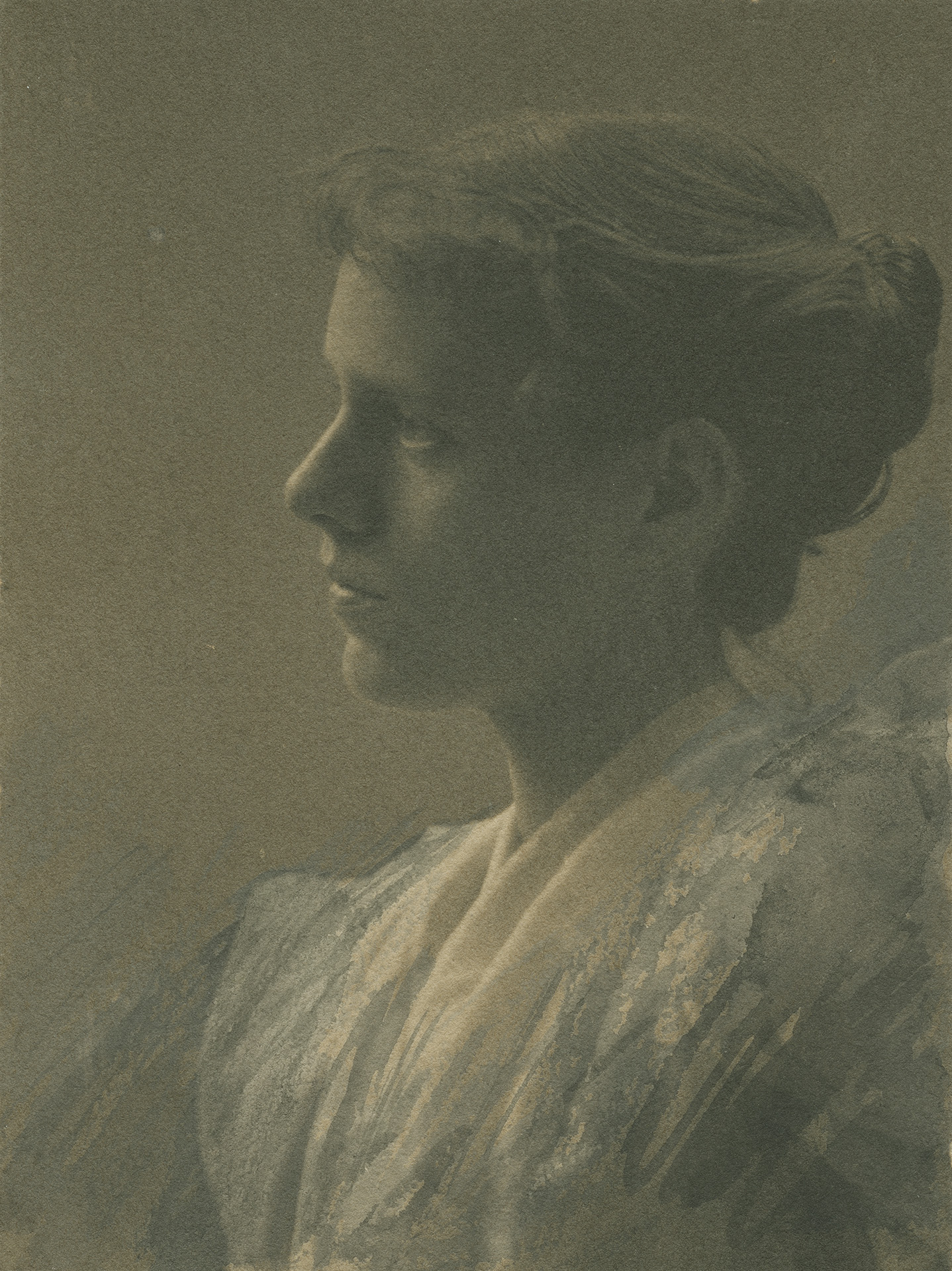
- Eva Watson, c. 1895, platinum print retouched with gouache, Department of Image Collections, National Gallery of Art Library, Washington, DC
- Born: Eva Lawrence Watson; September 16, 1867
- Died: 1935 (aged 67)
- Occupations: photographer, painter
- Spouse: Martin Schütze (m. 1901)

Eva Watson-Schütze (September 16, 1867 – May 20, 1935) was an American photographer who was one of the founding members of the Photo-Secession.

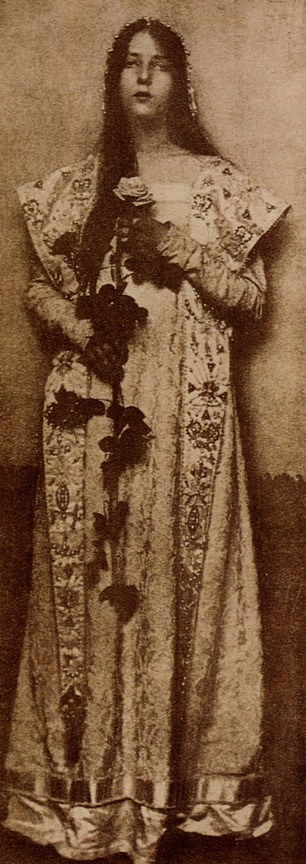
"The Rose", by Eva Watson-Schütze. Photogravure published in Camera Work, No 9, 1905

== Life ==
She was born as Eva Lawrence Watson in Jersey City, New Jersey on September 16, 1867. Her parents were Dr. John and Mary Lawrence Watson, whose family had come from Scotland. She was the youngest of four children, but little else is known about her family or early childhood.

In 1883, when she was sixteen, she enrolled in the Pennsylvania Academy of the Fine Arts in Philadelphia, where she studied under the well-known painter and photographer Thomas Eakins. Her interests at that time were watercolor and oil painting, and it's unknown if she took any interest in Eakins’ photography.

Around the 1890s, Watson began to develop a passion for photography, and soon she decided to make it her career. Between 1894 and 1896 she shared a photographic studio with Amelia Van Buren, another Academy alumna, in Philadelphia, and the following year she opened her own portrait studio. She quickly became known for her pictorialist style, and soon her studio was known as a gathering place for photographers who championed this aesthetic vision.

In 1897, she wrote to photographer Frances Benjamin Johnston about her belief in women's future in photography: "There will be a new era, and women will fly into photography."

In 1898, six of her photographs were chosen to be exhibited at the first Philadelphia Photographic Salon, where she exhibited under the name Eva Lawrence Watson. It was through this exhibition that she became acquainted with Alfred Stieglitz, who was one of the judges for the exhibit.

In 1899, she was elected as a member of the Photographic Society of Philadelphia. Photographer and critic Joseph Keiley praised the work she exhibited that year, saying she showed "delicate taste and artistic originality".

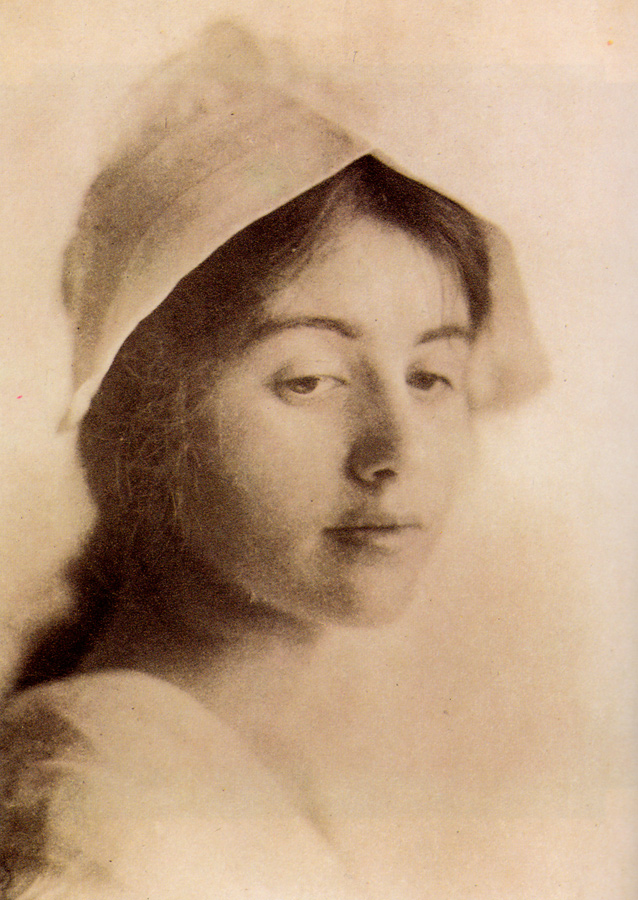
"A Study Head", by Eva Watson-Schütze. Photogravure published in Camera Notes, Vol 4 No 3, January 1901

The following year, 1900, she joined the jury for the Philadelphia Photographic Salon. A sign of her stature as a photographer at that time may be seen by looking at the other members of the jury, who were Alfred Stieglitz, Gertrude Kasebier, Frank Eugene and Clarence H. White. Frances Johnston, to whom she had written three years earlier, asked Watson to submit work for a groundbreaking exhibition of American women photographers in Paris. Watson objected at first, saying, "It has been one of my special hobbies – and one I have been very emphatic about, not to have my work represented as ‘women’s work’. I want [my work] judged by only one standard irrespective of sex." Johnston persisted, however, and Watson had twelve prints – the largest number of any photographer – in the show that took place in 1901, the year she married Professor Martin Schütze, a German-born trained lawyer who had received his Ph.D. in German literature from the University of Pennsylvania in 1899. He took a teaching position in Chicago, where the couple soon moved. Also in 1901, she was elected a member of The Linked Ring. She found the ability to correspond with some of the most progressive photographers of the day very invigorating, and she began to look for similar connections in the U.S.

In 1902, she suggested the idea of forming an association of independent and like-minded photographers to Alfred Stieglitz. They corresponded several times about this idea, and by the end of the year she joined Stieglitz as one of the founding members of the famous Photo-Secession. About 1903, Watson-Schütze began to spend summers in Woodstock at the Byrdcliffe Colony in the Catskill Mountains of New York. She and her husband later bought land nearby and built a home they called "Hohenwiesen" (High Meadows) where she would spend most of her summer and autumn months from about 1910 until about 1925.

In 1905, Joseph Keiley wrote a lengthy article about her in Camera Work, saying she was "one of the staunchest and sincerest upholders of the pictorial movement in America."

As she began to spend more time at Byrdcliffe, her interests in painting were reawakened, and within a few years she was spending more time in front of a canvas than behind a camera. She became a student of William Emile Schumacher, an American painter who exhibited at the famous Armory Show of 1913. After 1910, she made fewer and fewer photographs, and by 1920 she had ceased photography except for family photos.

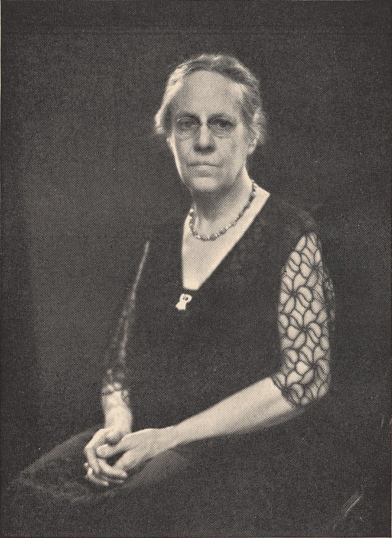
Self-portrait, ca. 1935

In 1929, Watson-Schütze became the director of The Renaissance Society, a non-collecting museum founded in 1915 at the University of Chicago. Under Watson-Schütze's direction from 1929 to 1935, the society presented groundbreaking exhibitions of early modernists such as Pablo Picasso, Georges Braque, Marc Chagall, Jean Arp, Joan Miró, and Constantin Brâncuși. It was said of her tenure there, "In those six years she transformed the group from a largely amateurish, unfocused organization into an internationally recognized, truly vanguard institution advancing a rigorous modernist agenda."

Watson-Schütze died in Chicago on May 20, 1935, aged 67. Later that year, the Renaissance Society held a memorial exhibition of her work. It included 32 paintings and two drawings but none of her photographs.

Since Watson-Schütze's death there have been two retrospective exhibitions of her photographs: Eva Watson-Schütze, Chicago Photo-Secessionist, (ISBN 0-943056-06-3) at the University of Chicago Library in 1985, and Eva Watson-Schütze, Photographer, at the Samuel Dorsky Museum Art at the State University of New York at New Paltz in 2009.

Her works were included in exhibits at the National Museum of Women in the Arts in Washington, DC:

- A History of Women Photographers, 1997
- Women Photographers in Camera Work, 1992
