= John Canaday =

American art critic and historian (1907–1985)

- Born: John Edwin Canaday; February 1, 1907; Fort Scott, Kansas, U.S.
- Died: July 19, 1985 (aged 78); New York City, U.S.
- Other name: Matthew Head
- Education: University of Texas; Yale University
- Occupations: Academic, art historian, critic, journalist, novelist
- Spouse: Katherine S. Hoover
- Children: Two sons

John Edwin Canaday (February 1, 1907 – July 19, 1985) was a leading American art critic, author and art historian.

== Early life and education ==
John Canaday was born in Fort Scott, Kansas, to Franklin and Agnes F. (Musson) Canaday. His family moved to Dallas when Canaday was seven and later moved to San Antonio, where he attended Main Avenue High School.

Canaday entered the University of Texas in 1924 and earned a B.A. degree in French and English literature in 1929. He subsequently studied painting and art history at Yale University, where he received an M.A. in 1933.

He taught at Washburn University of Topeka in 1933–34; at Newcomb College, Tulane University, New Orleans (1934–36); Hollins College, Roanoke, Virginia (1936–38); and the University of Virginia, Charlottesville (1938–50).

In 1943, he traveled to the Belgian Congo and acted as a French interpreter for the Bureau of Economic Welfare. The following year he joined the United States Marine Corps. He served as a lieutenant in an air-warning squadron in the Pacific until the end of World War II, after which he returned to the University of Virginia.

From 1950 to 1952, Canaday headed the art school at Newcomb College in New Orleans. He worked as chief of the educational division at the Philadelphia Museum of Art from 1953 to 1959. During this period he wrote the text for Metropolitan Seminars in Art, a widely distributed series of 24 portfolios published between 1958 and 1960 by the Metropolitan Museum of Art in New York City.

== Newspaper career ==
In 1959, Canaday began a 17-year career as a leading art critic for The New York Times. In his first column on September 6, 1959, he inflamed the art establishment by proclaiming that Abstract Expressionism, the dominant style of the period, allowed "exceptional tolerance for incompetence and deception." Although he acknowledged the talent of the best Abstract Expressionists, he noted that "we have been had" by the "freaks, the charlatans, and the misled who surround this handful of serious and talented artists." Canaday's inaugural column and subsequent articles criticizing this style provoked a much-publicized letter to The New York Times signed by 49 of the nation's leading art figures, who denounced Canaday as an agitator. "I have trouble vis-à-vis Canaday," one artist wrote. "What he thinks of me, he can print, while what I think of him is unprintable." Other artists and critics, however, championed him as an honest and articulate observer of the art scene, which continued to provide ample targets for his barbed wit over the years.

In 1964, Canaday wrote a scathing review of Tomorrow Forever, which was selected as the theme painting for the Pavilion of Education at the 1964 New York World's Fair. Writing in the New York Times, Canaday called the oeuvre of Margaret Keane (at that time being passed off as the work of her husband Walter Keane) "tasteless hack work", and described Tomorrow Forever, which contained about 100 children, as "about 100 times as bad as the average Keane." The painting was later established to have been the work of Margaret Keane, who had secretly painted the creations credited to her husband. Critic Jan Lisa Huttner, writing retrospectively about the controversy in a postscript to an FF2 Media article written by Amanda Wall, noted that Canaday died in 1985, a year before Keane established her authorship in court, and as such was "off the hook"; however, Huttner went on to criticize the New York Times for its subsequent treatment of Keane. Huttner would later select Big Eyes as the focal point of the SWAN Day Sweet 16 program to celebrate the film's 10th anniversary.

== Author ==
In addition to writing for the Times, Canaday published a number of influential books, notably Mainstreams of Modern Art: David to Picasso (1959), winner of the Athenaeum Literary Award and a popular art history textbook for many years. His experiences as a critic provided the subject matter of two books, Embattled Critic: Views on Modern Art (1962) and Culture Gulch: Notes on Art and Its Public in the 1960s (1969). He also wrote Keys to Art, with Katherine H. Canaday (1963), The Lives of the Painters (1969), Baroque Painters (1972), Late Gothic to Renaissance Painters (1972), Neoclassic to Post-Impressionist Painters (1972), My Best Girls: 8 Drawings (1972), The New York Guide to Dining Out in New York (1972), The Artful Avocado (1973), Richard Estes: The Urban Landscape (1979), What is Art? An Introduction to Painting, Sculpture, and Architecture (1980), and Ben Shahn, Voices and Visions (1981).

In the 1940s and 1950s, under the pen name Matthew Head, Canaday wrote seven crime novels: The Smell of Money (1943), The Devil in the Bush (1945), The Accomplice (1949), The Cabinda Affair (1949), The Congo Venus (1950), Another Man's Life (1953), and Murder at the Flea Club (1955), each originally published by Simon & Schuster of New York. Drawing in part on his experiences in the Congo, he set three of his mysteries in Africa, and they were heralded by one critic as subtly foreshadowing a time of change on the African continent.

In 1974, Canaday stepped down from his post as art critic in order to devote more time to writing books, although he continued to write restaurant reviews for the Times until his retirement in 1977.

Canaday taught several courses as a guest lecturer at the University of Texas in the spring of 1977. He continued to lecture and to write for such publications as Smithsonian magazine, The New Republic, and The New York Times Magazine until his death.

== Personal life and death ==
Canaday married Katherine S. Hoover on September 19, 1935, and they had two sons. He died of pancreatic cancer in New York City on July 19, 1985.

== In popular culture ==
In the 2014 film Big Eyes, directed by Tim Burton, Canaday is portrayed by actor Terence Stamp. In the film, Canaday derides Margaret Keane's paintings at a reception and prompts Walter Keane to threaten him with a fork. Although the substance of Canaday's remarks is similar to his infamous review in 1964, the confrontation between him and the Keanes is fictitious.

In a 2024 update to her initial review of Big Eyes, written after the SWAN Day Sweet 16 Q&A, feminist art critic Jan Lisa Huttner wrote:

[In 2014] My (mostly male) film critic colleagues found their solace in invoking New York Times art critic John Canaday! I was stunned. Canaday’s evisceration of the Big Eyes paintings was based on the assumption that the painter was Walter and Walter was obviously a fake and a fraud. True enough! But the whole point of Big Eyes was to prove that the real painter, Margaret, was utterly sincere and had created works of art that captured all her suppressed inner emotion...It took ten long years, but on March 30, 2024, Larry [Karaszewski] and I returned to the SVA Theatre for SWAN Day Sweet 16, and during the Q&A, Larry said this: "You were the person who understood this movie better than anybody else at that time period."

== Notes ==
- The New York Times, July 21, 1985.
- The New Yorker, January 4, 1964.
- Who's Who in America, 1984–85.
