= Menemsha Pond =

Salt pond

- Location within Massachusetts
- Location: Chilmark, Massachusetts & Aquinnah, Massachusetts
- Coordinates: 41°20′20″N 70°46′25″W
- Type: Salt Pond
- Basin countries: United States
- Surface area: 665 acres (269 ha)

Menemsha Pond is a salt pond split between the towns of Aquinnah & Chilmark, Massachusetts. At the mouth of the pond, the Menemsha Creek leads into the Menemsha Bight and the Vineyard Sound. Along Menemsha Creek sits the historic sea-side fishing village of Menemsha. Menemsha Pond connects to both Stonewall Pond via Nashaquitsa Pond and to Squibnocket Pond via the Squibnocket Herring Run.

Since 1902, Menemsha Pond is a federally recognized Harbor of Refuge. This designation altered the development of both the harbor at Menemsha and the channel into Menemsha Pond. Before the federal designation and redesign of the inlet, the channel was dredged locally to maintain access.

== History ==
Archeological exploration indicates that indigenous peoples of the Wampanoag tribe have inhabited the shores of Menemsha Pond for approximately 10,000 to 7,500 years. Additionally, the tribe still maintains a presence on the pound with the tribal run hatchery, herring run, and with the tribal members who fish both recreationally and commercially. In his 1969 book, Archaeology of Martha's Vineyard, William A Ritchie excavated and carbon-dated materials found in the shell middens and living sites around the Vineyard including around Menemsha and Sqiudnocket Pond.

In 1748 the Menemsha Road was laid out from Menemsha Pond to the common (south) road.

In 1890, the Chief of Engineers of the US Army conducted a preliminary examination of Menemsha Bight

Menemsha Bight, Massachusetts, an outlet into Vineyard Sound, on the north shore of the island of Marthas Vineyard, with a view of preventing the closing of said inlet. The improvement desired at this locality is the formation of a harbor of refuge for light-draft vessels by the construction of jetties and shore protection, estimated to cost $25,000. While this locality is regarded by Major Livermore and Col. Abbot as worthy of improvement, it is the opinion of these officers that in view of the difficulty of maintaining the improvement and of its large cost the demands of commerce do not justify the work being undertaken at the present time. Menemsha Bight is in the collection district of Edgartown, which is a port of entry. The amount of revenue collected at Edgartown in the last fiscal year was $310.94.

Although no work was done on the bight or creek at that time, this report would be a harbinger.

In 1938, all but one building in the town of Menemsha was destroyed during the hurricane of 1938. The strong surf surged through Menemsha and the small barrier beach that separated Menemsha pond and the ocean, washing away the collection of fishing shacks that populated the village. In the aftermath of the hurricane, the Army Corps of Engineers dredged the channel and built jetties on either side, hardening Menemsha's status as a port of refuge. The Menemsha channel would wander and change shape often, until the jetties were built. In fact, the Wampanoag word for the channel to Menemsha Pond is Wawitukq, meaning "the winding, twisting river". The 1938 hurricane also greatly damaged the fishing villages of Lobsterville and Squibnocket, both of whom would never recover. The new dredging of Menemsha harbor, with its added depth and dock space, made it ideal for the newly innovated motor-powered fishing and leisure boats.

=== Menemsha Bike Ferry ===
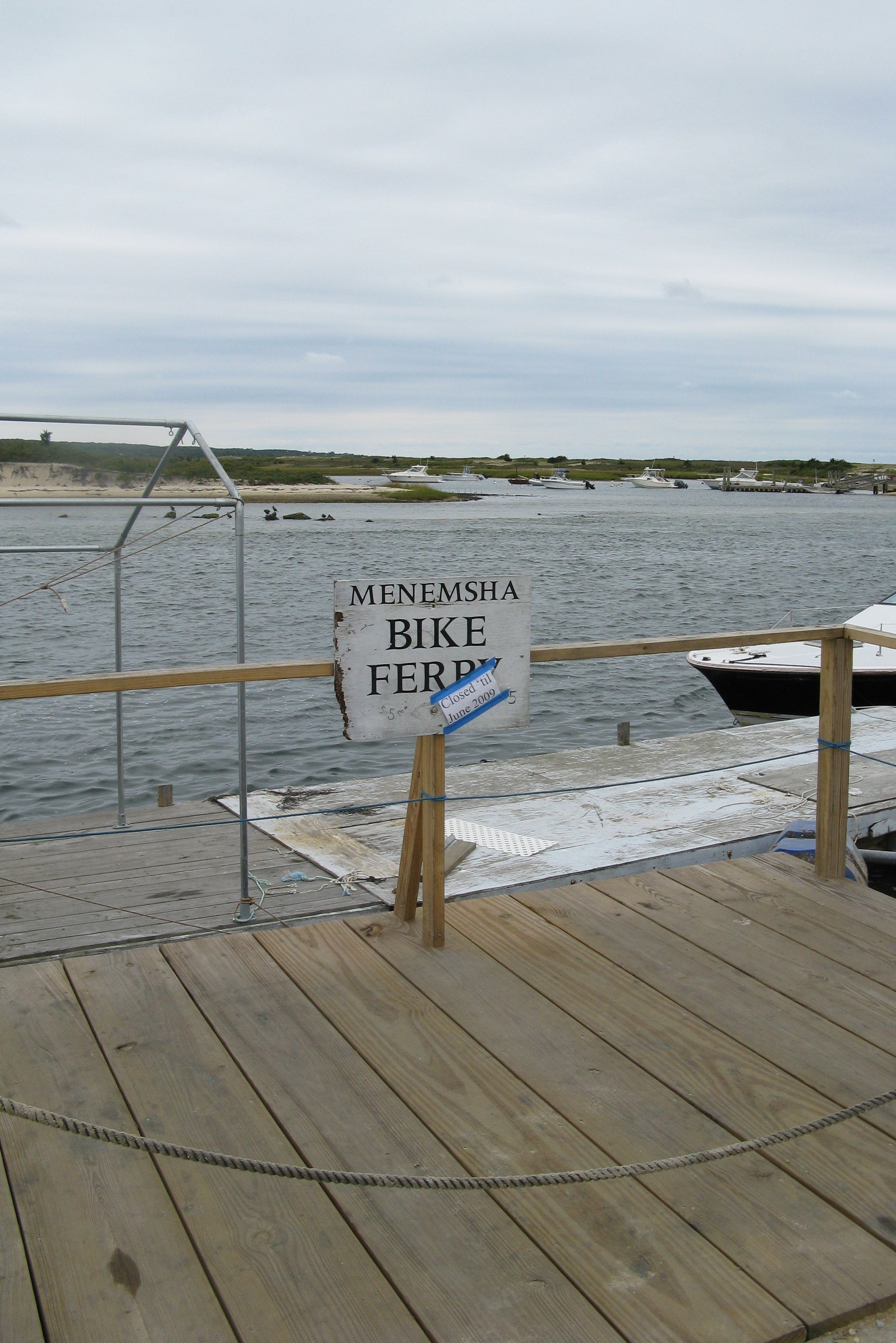
Bike Ferry, Menemsha MA

The Menemsha Bike Ferry, also known as the Aquinnah-Menemsha ferry, travels the short distance between Aquinnah and Chilmark, taking bikes and pedestrians over the water where Menemsha Pond meets Menemsha Creek.

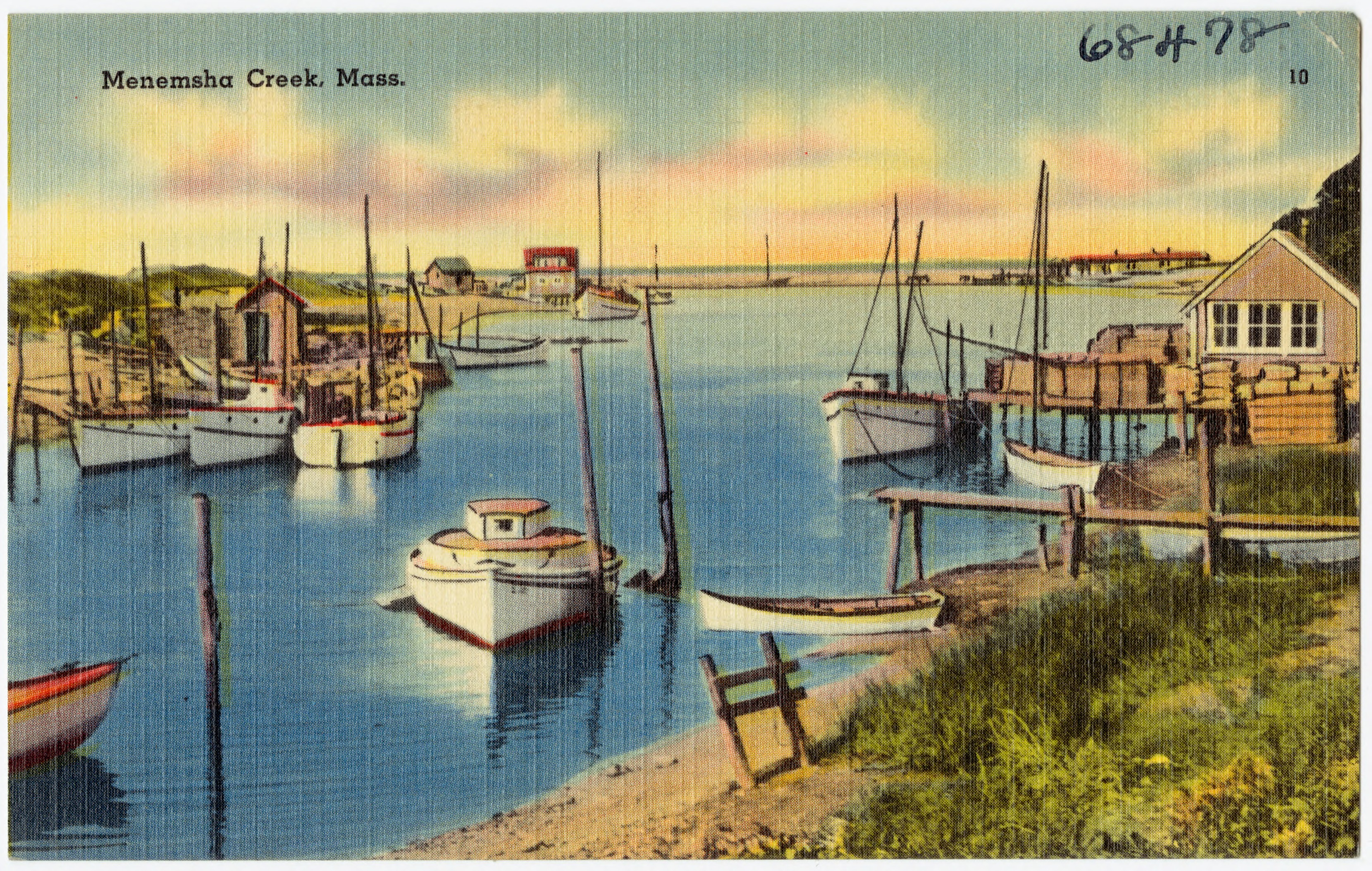
Menemsha Pond connects to the Vineyard Sound via the Menemsha Creek, ~1935

== Administration ==
The pond is dually administered by the towns of Aquinnah and Chilmark. Each town has their own harbormaster.

Aquinnah Harbormaster	Chilmark Harbormaster
Chip Vanderhoop	Ryan Rossi

== Fishing & Aquaculture ==
Menemsha Pond supports commercial oyster farming. The towns also seed bay scallops, quahogs, and oysters in the pond. In addition, the Wampanoag Tribe of Gay Head runs a hatchery on the southwest side of the pond. In the past, the hatchery conducted flounder spawning programs. Currently, there are no spawning programs; however, the tribe monitors the adjacent herring run from the hatchery building.

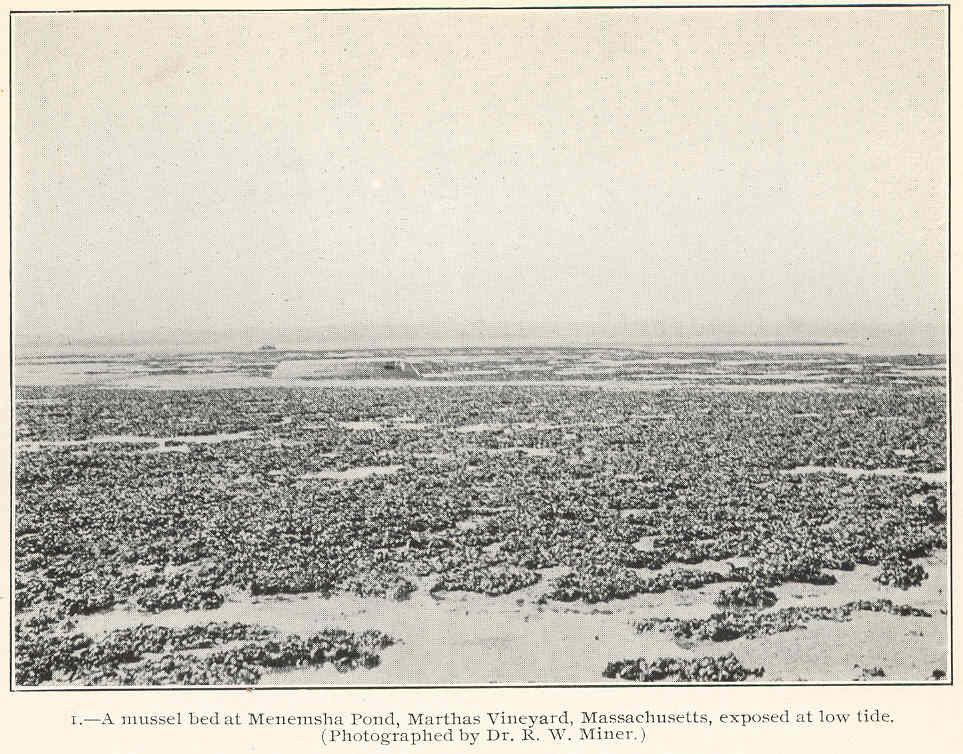
Shellfish in Menemsha Pond, 1911

Aquinnah Shellfish Constable	Chilmark Shellfish Constable
Buddy Vanderhoop	Isaiah Scheffer

Natural Resource Department of the Wampanoag Tribe of Gay Head
Bret Stearns, Director - - - - - - - - - - - 508-645-9265 ext. 141
