= Chilmark, Massachusetts =

- Town
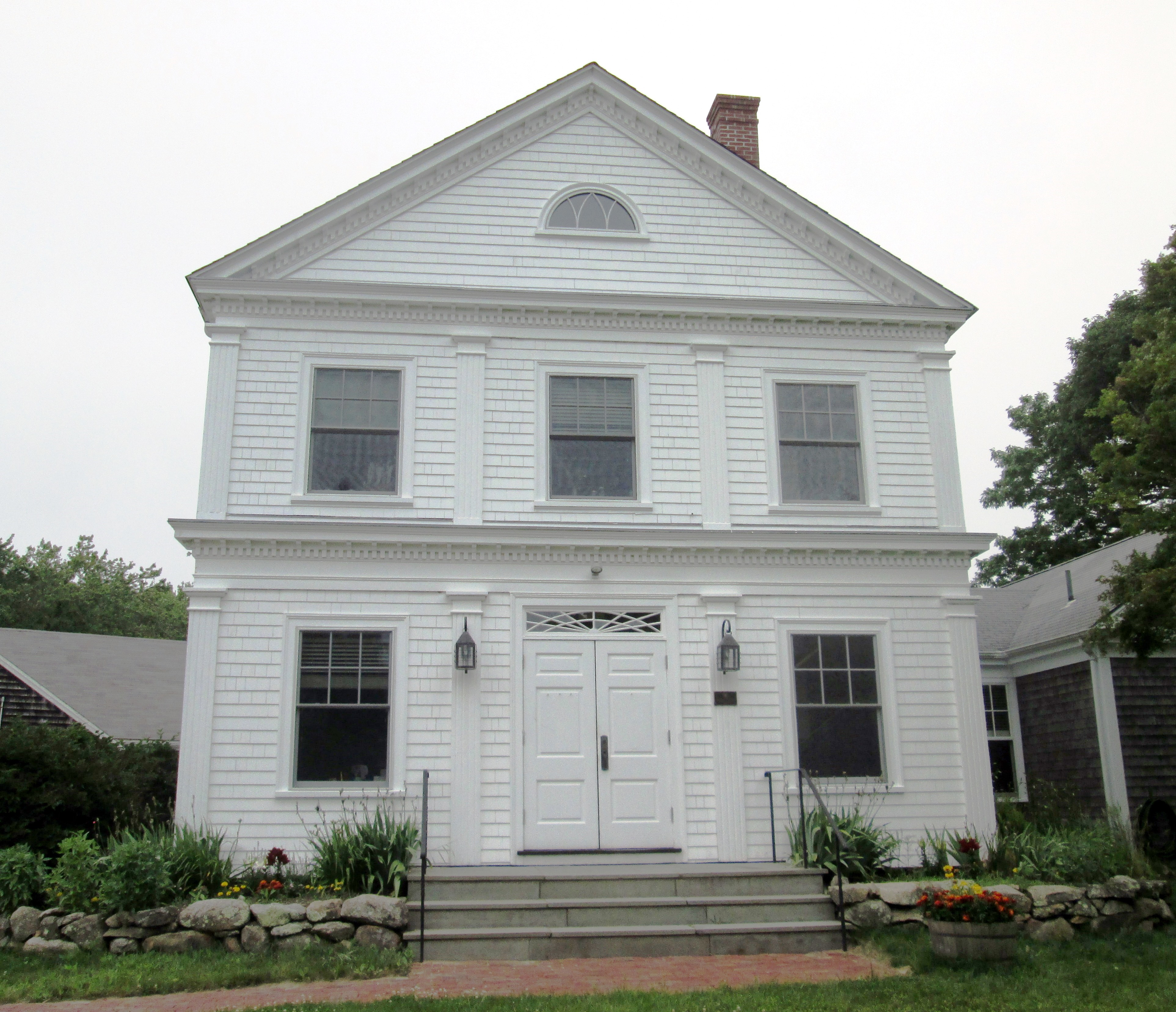
- Chilmark Town Hall

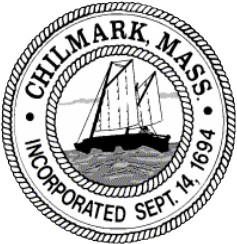
- Seal

- Location in Dukes County in Massachusetts
- Coordinates: 41°20′35″N 70°44′43″W
- Country: United States
- State: Massachusetts
- County: Dukes
- Settled: 1660
- Incorporated: September 14, 1694

Government
  - Type: Open town meeting
  - Town Administrator: Timothy Carroll

Area
  - Total: 100.4 sq mi (260.1 km^{2})
  - Land: 19.0 sq mi (49.3 km^{2})
  - Water: 81.4 sq mi (210.8 km^{2})
- Elevation: 92 ft (28 m)

Population (2020)
  - Total: 1,212
  - Density: 64/sq mi (24.6/km^{2})
- Time zone: UTC-5 (Eastern)
  - Summer (DST): UTC-4 (Eastern)
- ZIP code: 02535
- Area code: 508/774
- FIPS code: 25-13800
- GNIS feature ID: 0618288
- Website: www.chilmarkma.gov

Chilmark is a town on Martha's Vineyard in Massachusetts. The population was 1,212 at the 2020 census. The fishing village of Menemsha is located on the western side of the town along its border with the town of Aquinnah. Chilmark had the highest median home sale price of any town or city in Massachusetts in 2013.

== History ==
Governor Thomas Mayhew, the Elder (March 31, 1593 – March 25, 1682), established the first English settlement of Martha's Vineyard, Nantucket and adjacent islands in 1642. The town was officially incorporated on September 14, 1694, the first town to separate from the two original towns of Tisbury and Edgartown. The new town was named for Chilmark, the ancestral home of the family of Governor Thomas Mayhew of Tisbury, in the English county of Wiltshire. In 1714, Chilmark was made a township including the island of Nomans Land.

The town was once known for its unusually high percentage of deaf citizens. In 1854, Chilmark had a deaf population of one in every 25 people, while the national average was one deaf person in 5,728. (See Martha's Vineyard Sign Language.) Today the town is mostly residential, with a small working harbor in Menemsha along the Vineyard Sound side of the town.

In August 2009, 2010 and 2011, President Barack Obama and his family vacationed in Chilmark, renting the Blue Heron Farm.

== Geography ==
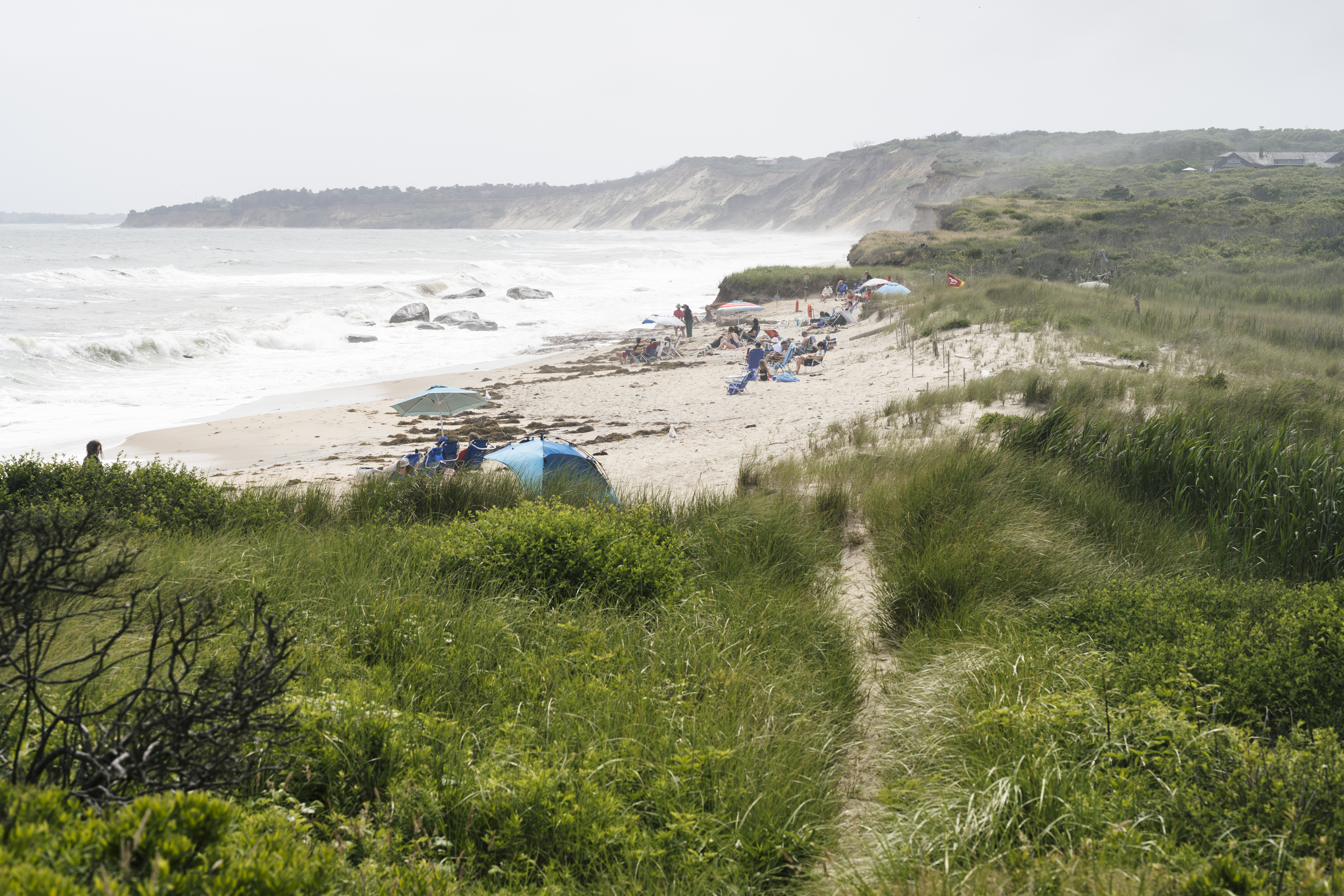
Lucy Vincent Beach on the south shore of the island.

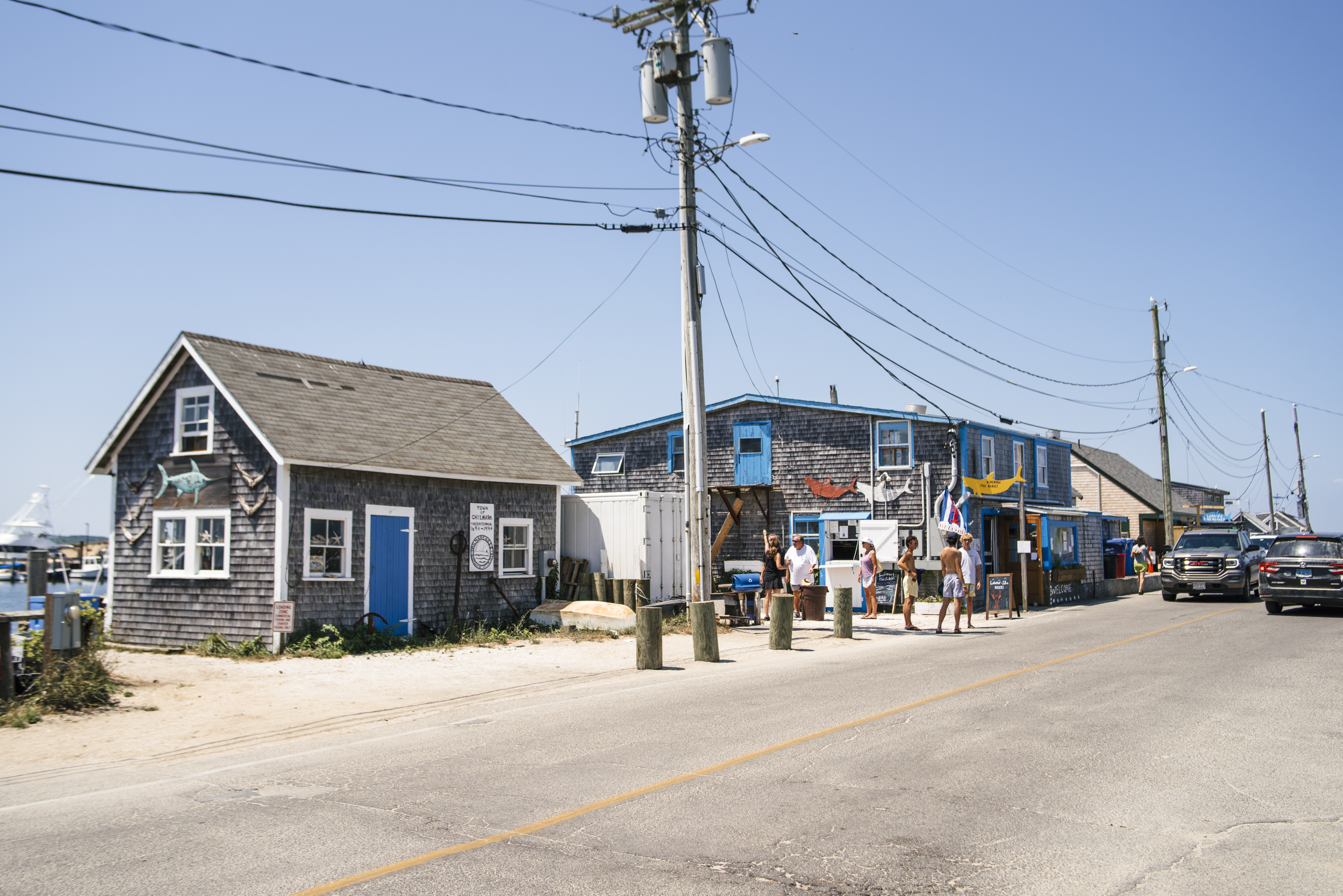
The fishing village of Menemsha.

According to the United States Census Bureau, the town has a land area of 19.0 square miles (49.3 km^{2}). Chilmark ranks 192nd of the 351 communities in the Commonwealth in terms of land area. Chilmark is bordered by Vineyard Sound and Aquinnah to the west, West Tisbury to the east, and the Atlantic Ocean to the south.

The town includes the island of Nomans Land, which lies southwest of Martha's Vineyard. Because of Nomans Land, the town is officially the second most southerly point in Massachusetts (the south shore of Nantucket is approximately a kilometer south of the southernmost point on Nomans Land). Chilmark has a series of small ponds along the Atlantic side of the town, and it shares Tisbury Great Pond to the east and Menemsha Pond and Squibnocket Pond to the southwest, along the Aquinnah town line. It is between these two ponds, which are 1,100 feet (340 m) apart at their closest point, that the only road to Aquinnah passes. Long Beach, privately owned, runs along the southern side of Squibnocket Pond and technically connects the towns. At one point in the late 17th and early 18th century, Squibnocket Pond was open to the sea. However, the barrier beach with its sand dunes eventually closed this opening permanently. Occasionally in winter storms, waves will wash across low points in the beach, but the beach itself has not been breached in a hundred years, unlike other barrier beaches on Martha's Vineyard.

Chilmark has the highest point on Martha's Vineyard, at the 311-foot (95 m) summit of Peaked Hill.

The town has several sanctuaries and preserves, the largest of which being the Menemsha Hills Reservation just northeast of the village which shares that name. The town also has six beaches; one is at Menemsha, another on the inner shore of Menemsha Bay, and the others are all along the Atlantic coast. (Note that several of these beaches are restricted to landowners only, and those designated as public require a beach pass.) There is also a boat launch in Menemsha, as well as a Coast Guard station, in Menemsha Creek (Harbor).The Coast Guard Station burned to the ground in July 2010 but was rebuilt and recommissioned in April 2015.

The town has no direct access to the mainland via ferry or by air; Martha's Vineyard Airport is in neighboring West Tisbury, and the Steamship Authority ferries to Woods Hole are in Vineyard Haven, which is 12 miles (19 km) northeast of the town center, and in Oak Bluffs, 16 miles (26 km) away.

== Demographics ==
Historical population
Year	Pop.	±%
1790	771	—
1850	747	−3.1%
1860	654	−12.4%
1870	476	−27.2%
1880	494	+3.8%
1890	353	−28.5%
1900	324	−8.2%
1910	282	−13.0%
1920	240	−14.9%
1930	252	+5.0%
1940	226	−10.3%
1950	183	−19.0%
1960	238	+30.1%
1970	340	+42.9%
1980	489	+43.8%
1990	650	+32.9%
2000	843	+29.7%
2010	866	+2.7%
2020	1,212	+40.0%
2023	1,232	+1.7%
Source: United States census records and Population Estimates Program data.

=== 2020 census ===
Chilmark town, Massachusetts – Racial and ethnic composition Note: the US Census treats Hispanic/Latino as an ethnic category. This table excludes Latinos from the racial categories and assigns them to a separate category. Hispanics/Latinos may be of any race.
Race / Ethnicity (NH = Non-Hispanic)	Pop 2000	Pop 2010	Pop 2020	% 2000	% 2010	% 2020
White alone (NH)	818	830	1,111	97.03%	95.84%	91.67%
Black or African American alone (NH)	3	15	12	0.36%	1.73%	0.99%
Native American or Alaska Native alone (NH)	1	2	3	0.12%	0.23%	0.25%
Asian alone (NH)	3	2	8	0.36%	0.23%	0.66%
Native Hawaiian or Pacific Islander alone (NH)	0	0	0	0.00%	0.00%	0.00%
Other race alone (NH)	6	1	12	0.71%	0.12%	0.99%
Mixed race or Multiracial (NH)	5	9	46	0.59%	1.04%	3.80%
Hispanic or Latino (any race)	7	7	20	0.83%	0.81%	1.65%
Total	843	866	1,212	100.00%	100.00%	100.00%

As of the census of 2000, there were 843 people, 382 households, and 237 families residing in the town. The population density was 44.0 inhabitants per square mile (17.0/km^{2}). There were 1,409 housing units at an average density of 73.6 per square mile (28.4/km^{2}). The racial makeup of the town was 97.75% White, 0.36% African American, 0.12% Native American, 0.36% Asian, 0.71% from other races, and 0.71% from two or more races. Hispanic or Latino of any race were 0.83% of the population.

There were 382 households, out of which 25.7% had children under the age of 18 living with them, 52.4% were married couples living together, 6.8% had a female householder with no husband present, and 37.7% were non-families. Of all households 29.6% were made up of individuals, and 9.2% had someone living alone who was 65 years of age or older. The average household size was 2.21 and the average family size was 2.71.

In the town, the age distribution of the population shows 20.8% under the age of 18, 4.0% from 18 to 24, 23.7% from 25 to 44, 32.7% from 45 to 64, and 18.7% who were 65 years of age or older. The median age was 46 years. For every 100 females, there were 96.0 males. For every 100 females age 18 and over, there were 90.9 males.

The median income for a household in the town was $41,917, and the median income for a family was $63,750. Males had a median income of $35,469 versus $33,281 for females. The per capita income for the town was $30,029. About 5.7% of families and 7.6% of the population were below the poverty line, including 9.6% of those under age 18 and 4.3% of those age 65 or over.

Statistically, Chilmark ranks 324th in terms of population, and 311th by population density. It is the second smallest population on Martha's Vineyard (ahead of Aquinnah), but is the least densely populated town on the island.

== Government ==
On the national level, Chilmark is a part of Massachusetts's 9th congressional district, and is currently represented by Bill Keating. The state's senior member of the United States Senate is Elizabeth Warren. The state's junior Senator is Ed Markey.

On the state level, Chilmark is represented in the Massachusetts House of Representatives as a part of the Barnstable, Dukes and Nantucket district, which includes all of Martha's Vineyard and Nantucket, as well as a portion of Falmouth. The town is represented in the Massachusetts Senate as a portion of the Cape and Islands district, which includes all of Martha's Vineyard, Nantucket and most of Barnstable County (with the exception of Bourne, Sandwich, Falmouth and Mashpee). All of Dukes County is patrolled by the Fifth (Oak Bluffs) Barracks of Troop D of the Massachusetts State Police.

Chilmark is governed on the local level by the open town meeting form of government, and is led by a board of selectmen. All of the town's facilities are centered at a location known as Beetlebung Corner. The Town Hall, Tri-Town Ambulance, and the Fire Department share a building in the northern quadrant of the crossroads, the police station is located next to the Chilmark Tavern, and the post office and the town's Free Public Library occupy the southern. The current library opened in 2003, having outgrown the previous library just to the east of the current location at the corner.

== Education ==
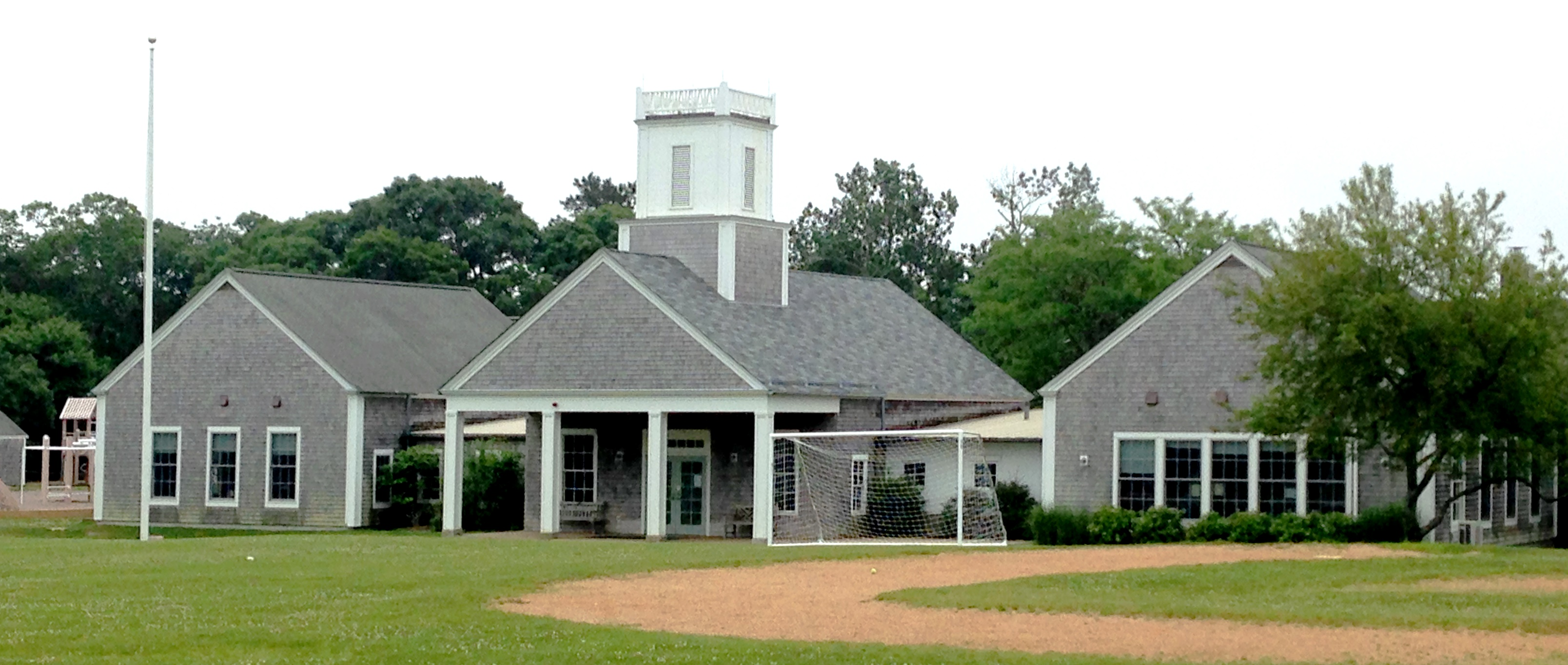
The Chilmark School (2019)

Chilmark is part of the Martha's Vineyard Regional School District along with Aquinnah, Edgartown, Oak Bluffs, Tisbury, and West Tisbury. Students in Chilmark attend Aquinnah-Chilmark Regional Elementary School along with Aquinnah, from grades K–8. High School students then attend Martha's Vineyard Regional High School. The MVRHS's teams are nicknamed the Vineyarders, and their colors are violet and white. The school has a longstanding rivalry with Nantucket High School, with both competing for the Island Cup on an annual basis.

== In popular culture ==
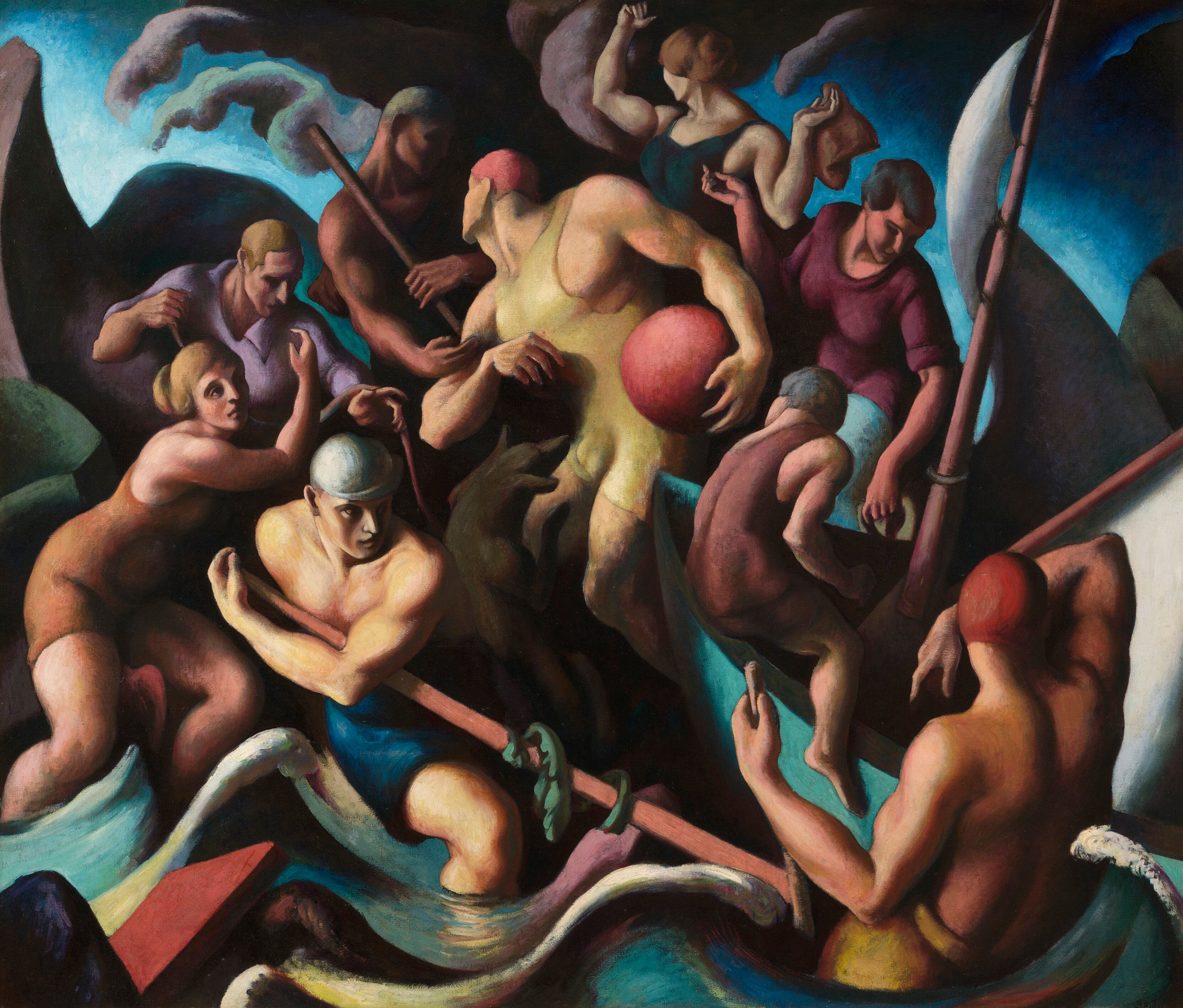
People of Chilmark (Figure Composition), 1920, by Thomas Hart Benton, in the Hirshhorn Museum collection in Washington, D.C.

- On the television show The X-Files, Fox Mulder was raised in Chilmark. It was in Chilmark that his younger sister Samantha's alien abduction happened on November 27, 1973.
- Chilmark is the setting of the wedding in the movie Jumping the Broom.
- At the Hirshhorn Museum in Washington, D.C., there is a 1920 painting by artist Thomas Hart Benton called People of Chilmark. Benton first visited Chilmark in the summer of 1919. People of Chilmark was the artist's first masterpiece and, at 5½' × 6½', the largest painting he had executed to date.
- Chilmark and Menemsha, the fishing village located on the western side of the town, are also the locations of the fictional town of "Amity Island" in the 1975 Steven Spielberg movie Jaws.
- Chilmark and Chilmark Field is mentioned in the memoir Memorial Days by Geraldine Brooks about her late husband, Pulitzer Prize winner Tony Horwitz.

== See also ==
- Chilmark, Wiltshire, an English village with the same name
