= Kettle Cove (Massachusetts) =

Bay in Dukes County, Massachusetts, US

- Location of Kettle Cove within Massachusetts Kettle Cove (the United States)
- Coordinates: 41°28′45″N 70°46′33″W
- Part of: Buzzards Bay

Kettle Cove is a bay in Dukes County, Massachusetts. It is located on Naushon Island 0.8 miles (1.3 km) west of Tarpaulin Cove and northeast of Robinson's Hole in the Town of Gosnold.
