= Buzzards Bay =

Bay in Massachusetts, USA

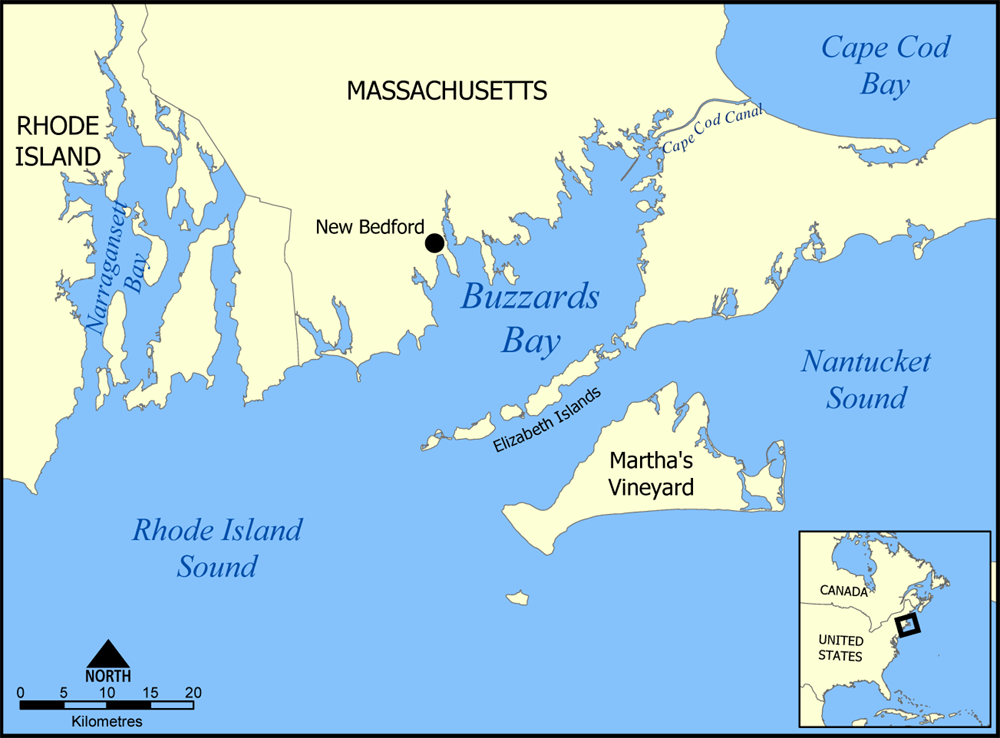
- Map of Buzzards Bay

- Location within Massachusetts
- Location: Massachusetts
- Coordinates: 41°36′N 70°45′W
- Etymology: Named after osprey that were mistakenly called "buzzards"
- Part of: Atlantic Ocean
- Max. length: 28 mi (45 km)
- Max. width: 8 mi (13 km)
- Surface area: 250 sq mi (650 km^{2})
- Average depth: 36 ft (11 m)
- Settlements: New Bedford, Massachusetts

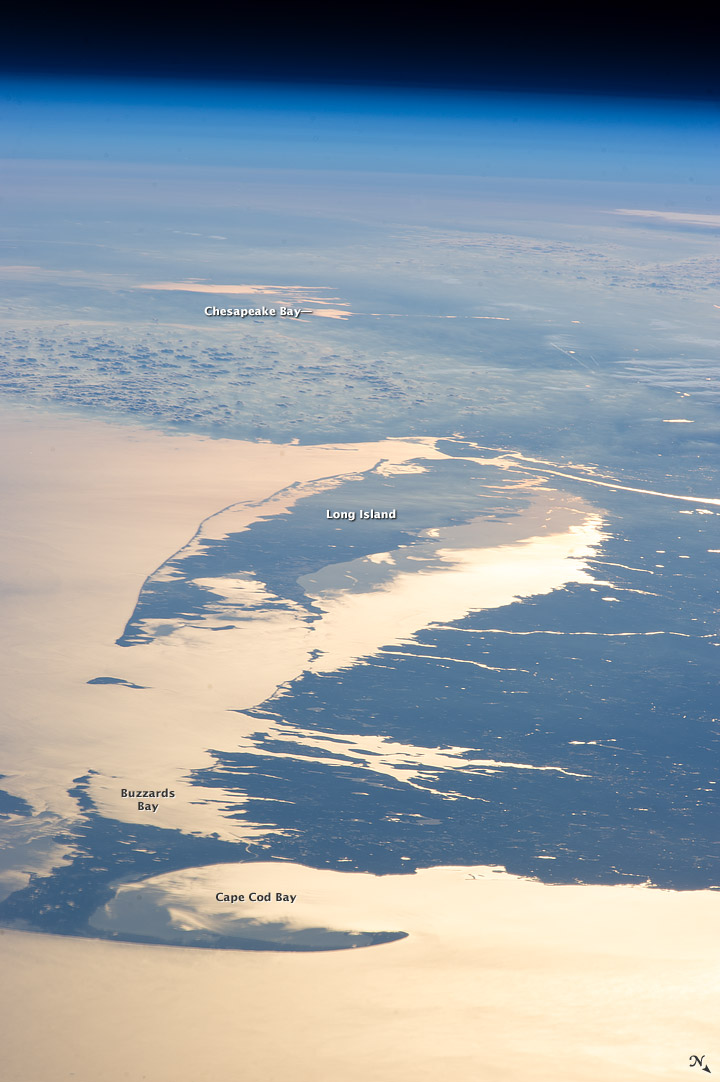
Buzzards Bay and surrounding area from orbit (looking southwest)

Buzzards Bay is a bay of the Atlantic Ocean adjacent to the U.S. state of Massachusetts. It is approximately 28 miles (45 kilometers) long by 8 miles (12 kilometers) wide. It is a popular destination for fishing, boating, and tourism. Buzzards Bay is often considered the finest sailing location on the East Coast and is frequently compared in terms of sailing conditions to San Francisco Bay. Since 1914, Buzzards Bay has been connected to Cape Cod Bay by the Cape Cod Canal. In 1988, under the Clean Water Act, the Environmental Protection Agency and the Commonwealth of Massachusetts designated Buzzards Bay to the National Estuary Program, as "an estuary of national significance" that is threatened by pollution, land development, or overuse.

== Names ==
The Algonquian-speaking Wampanoag called the body of water Poughkeeste 'bay with coves,' potentially the same as pocasset meaning 'where the stream widens.'

The term Buzzards Bay comes from a misidentification of the osprey native to the bay as buzzards.

== Geography ==
It is surrounded by the Elizabeth Islands on the south, by Cape Cod on the east, and the southern coasts of Bristol and Plymouth counties in Massachusetts to the northwest. To the southwest, the bay is connected to Rhode Island Sound. The city of New Bedford, Massachusetts is a historically significant port on Buzzards Bay; the Port of New Bedford the world's most successful whaling port during the early- and mid-19th century, and has been the nation's most productive fishing port for the last several years.

== Geology ==
Buzzards Bay was created during the latter portion of the Pleistocene epoch through the interplay of glacial and oceanic processes. Beginning fifty thousand to seventy thousand years ago, the edges of the continental ice sheet covering much of North America began to fluctuate, leaving moraines to mark the former extent of the receded ice. One such moraine forms Cape Cod, which is most of the eastern shoreline of Buzzards Bay.

In addition to the moraines, the melting ice sheet produced extensive outwash plains composed of mixed sediments and ice that bordered the bay to the northwest and west. Melting ice blocks in the outwash deposits formed distinctive circular features called kettle lakes. Numerous examples of kettle lakes can be found to the northwest of the Cape Cod Canal. Finally, waters released from the melting ice sheet raised sea level by sixty to one-hundred-twenty meters (198–396 feet) and drowned preexisting outwash channels. Toward the end of the last ice age, fifteen thousand years ago until about six thousand years ago, Buzzards Bay was still dry land. During the past six thousand years, sea level has risen an average of one foot per century, and until about four thousand years ago, the landward boundary of Buzzards Bay extended only to about the current thirty-foot bathymetric contour, forming a coastline two-thirds of the way up the current bay, between West Falmouth and Mattapoisett.

The bay's current configuration, a well-mixed central bay and fringing shallow drowned-river valleys, with their shallow depth, tidal action, and surface waves, promotes mixing of the estuarine waters to create a productive aquatic ecosystem. Like many estuaries, however, increasing development and land-use changes by the surrounding communities are accompanied by nutrient runoff leading to eutrophication (an increase in nutrient levels leading to oxygen depletion) in the smaller embayments. Decreases in eelgrass, scallops, and herring have also been noted, but direct cause-and-effect relationships are not clear. Coordinated management efforts in Buzzards Bay have helped to decrease shellfish closures, conserve habitat for sea birds, and preserve open space.

== History ==
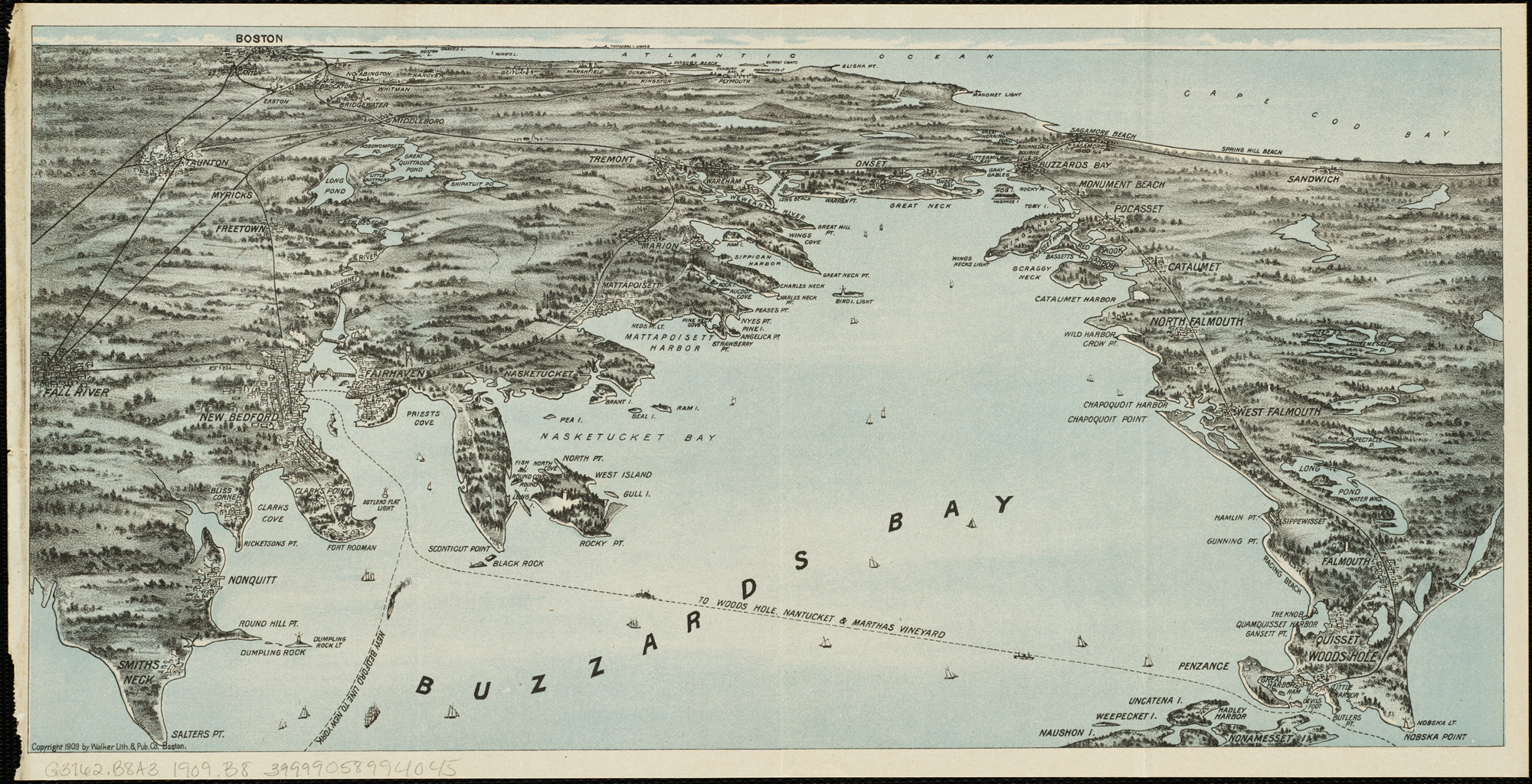
Birds eye view map, 1909

Buzzards Bay was first named Gosnold's Hope by Captain Bartholomew Gosnold. The modern name was presumably given by colonists who saw a large bird that they called a buzzard near its shores. The bird was actually an osprey. After a downturn caused by DDT, today increasing numbers of osprey breed along the shores of the bay thanks to restoration efforts led by the Buzzards Bay Coalition and longtime Westport residents Gil and Josephine Fernandez.

The first naval engagement of the American Revolution, the Battle off Fairhaven, occurred in Buzzards Bay when patriots retrieved two vessels that were captured by the British sloop of war Falcon. On 14 May 1775, American Captain Daniel Egery and Capt. Nathaniel Pope of Fairhaven in the sloop Success (40 tons, 30 men) retrieved two vessels captured by the British crew of Captain John Linzee (Lindsey), Royal Navy commander of HMS Falcon (14 guns, 110 men). Crew member Noah Stoddard and the others took the first naval prisoners of the war, 13 British crew; two were wounded and one died.

The bay was the location, in 1936, of one of only five documented fatal shark attacks in the commonwealth's history.

In 1987, researchers from the Woods Hole Oceanographic Institution experimented with a new growth structure allowing Blue mussels to grow above the Benthic Turbidity Zone leading to a new commercial scale mariculture technique.

In 1991, towns located on Buzzards Bay suffered the worst effects from the storm surge of Hurricane Bob.

The Buzzards Bay disaster happened on April 27, 2003. An oil spill of 98,000 gallons of oil leaked from a barge, destroying much of the shellfish business and killing many birds.

Ra Ra Riot's John Pike's body was found in Buzzard's Bay. He had disappeared from a party in Fairhaven, Massachusetts in June 2007, and was found several weeks later in the bay.

On January 7, 2018, due to the 2017–18 North American cold wave, part of the bay froze over.

== Islands ==
- Amrita Island
- Bassetts Island
- Bird Island
- Elizabeth Islands
  - Bachelor Island
  - Baret Island
  - Cuttyhunk Island
  - Nashawena Island
  - Naushon Island
  - Nonamesset Island
  - Pasque Island
  - Penikese Island
  - Uncatena Island
  - Veckatimest Island
  - Weepecket Islands
- Gull Island
- Monohansett Island
- Onset Island
- West Island
- Wickets Island

== See also ==
- List of islands of Massachusetts for a more-or-less complete listing of the islets, rocks, and ledges within the bay.
