= Bull Island (Dukes County, Massachusetts) =

Island in Dukes County, Massachusetts, United States

- Location within Massachusetts Location within the United States

Geography
- Coordinates: 41°30′45″N 70°42′13″W
- Archipelago: Elizabeth Islands
- Total islands: 1
- Highest elevation: 7 ft (2.1 m)

Administration
- United States
- State: Massachusetts
- County: Dukes County

Bull Island is one of the Elizabeth Islands between Nonamesset Island and Uncatena Island, it separates Hadley Harbor from Inner Harbor. Bull Island is located in Dukes County, Massachusetts in the Town of Gosnold.
