= Tarpaulin Cove Light =

Lighthouse in Massachusetts, U.S.

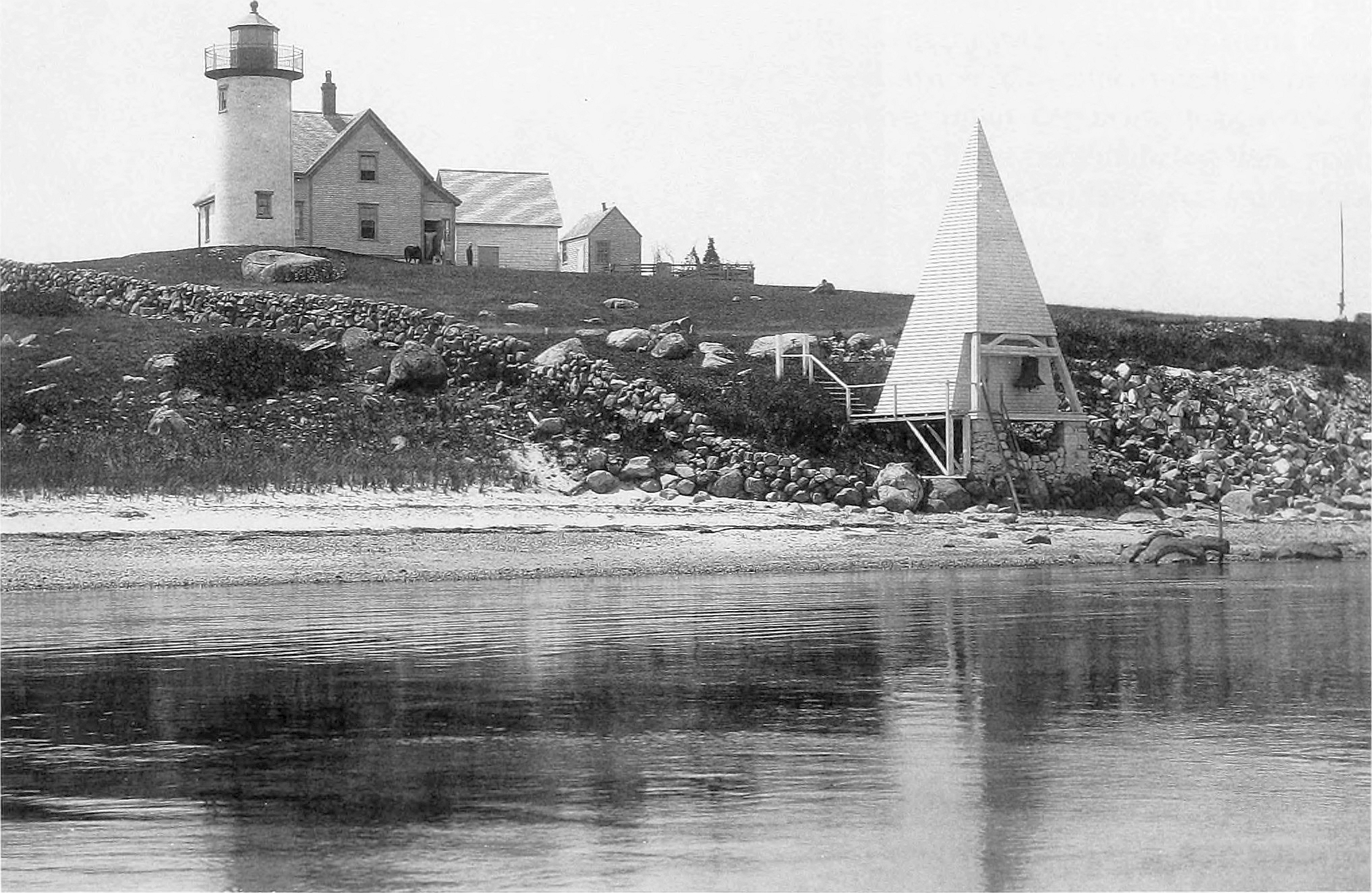
- 1896 view, including the lightkeeper's house and fog station
- Location: Naushon Island Gosnold, Massachusetts
- Coordinates: 41°28′7.74″N 70°45′26.991″W

Tower
- Constructed: 1818
- Foundation: Concrete
- Construction: Brick
- Automated: 1941
- Height: 28 feet (8.5 m)
- Shape: Tower with small white building attached to west side.
- Markings: White with black lantern
- Heritage: National Register of Historic Places listed place
- Fog signal: Bell 1891-1938

Light
- First lit: 1891
- Focal height: 78 feet (24 m)
- Lens: 5th order Fresnel lens (1856), 4th order Fresnel lens (1891), 12 inches (300 mm) (current)
- Range: 9 nautical miles (17 km; 10 mi)
- Characteristic: Flashing white, 6 sec
- Tarpaulin Cove Light
- U.S. National Register of Historic Places
- MPS: Lighthouses of Massachusetts TR
- NRHP reference No.: 87001505
- Added to NRHP: June 15, 1987

The Tarpaulin Cove Light is a historic lighthouse on Naushon Island, one of the Elizabeth Islands of southern Massachusetts. It is located in the town of Gosnold, Massachusetts. Built on the site of a light station first established privately in the 18th century, the current tower dates from 1891. A keeper's house built at the same time has not survived. The light is 78 feet (24 m) above Mean High Water, and its white light is visible for 9 nautical miles (17 km; 10 mi).

== History ==
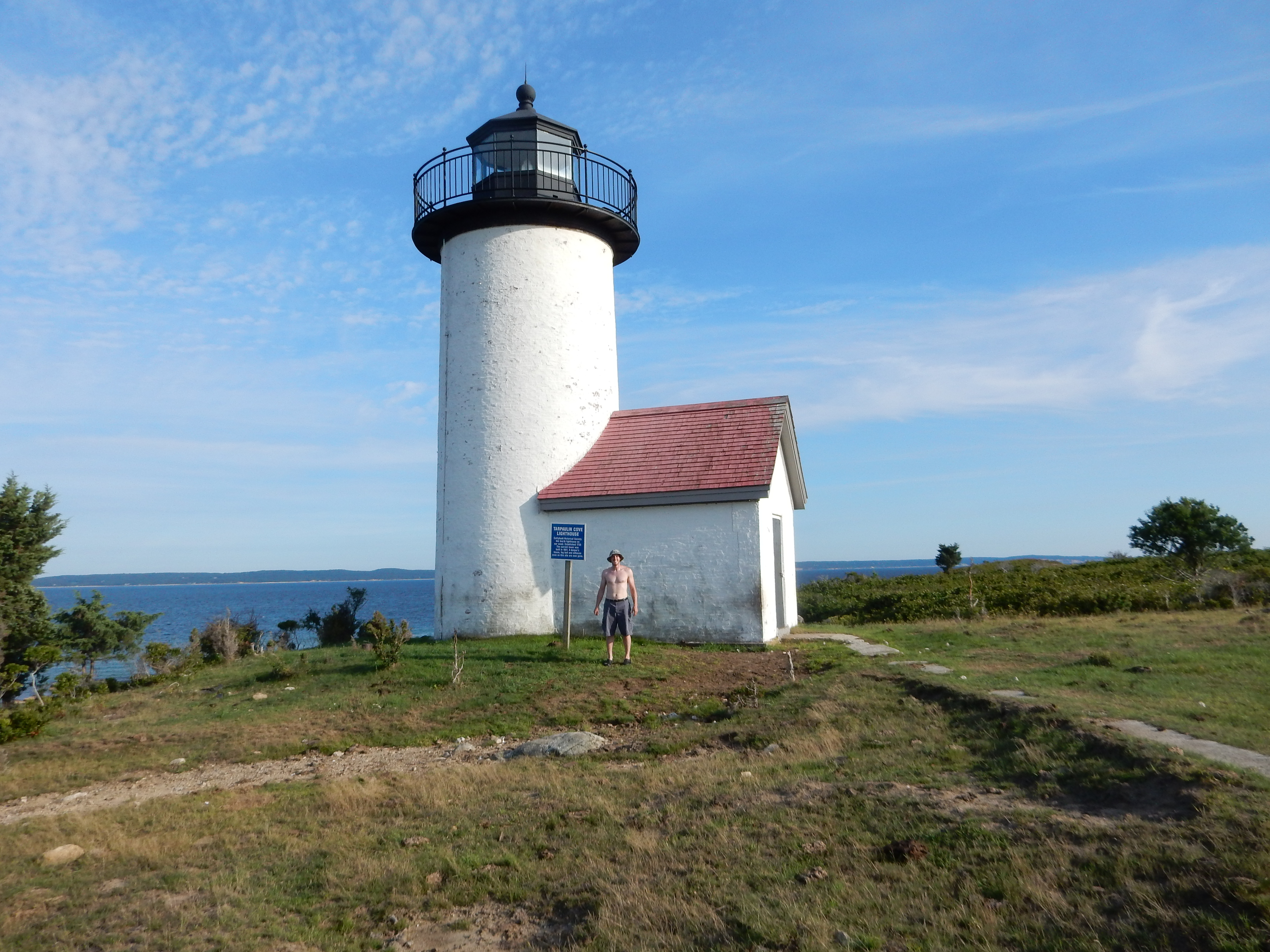
The lighthouse in 2015

Naushon Island is one of the Elizabeth Islands, a chain of islands that separate Buzzards Bay from Vineyard Sound off the south shore of Massachusetts. The islands have been occupied by English colonists since the 17th century. Tarpaulin Cove is on the south-central coast of the island, a point where the coastline curves from a generally westward direction to the south.

In 1759, Zaccheus Lumbert, a local tavern owner, established a light on the western shore of the cove, for the "public good of the Whalemen and Coasters". This light was maintained until 1807, when the government decided to establish a lightstation there. However, funding problems meant that a new light was not constructed until 1817, when a rubble tower was built on the site, and the light was formally manned.

The rubble tower was replaced in 1856 by a brick tower built on a concrete foundation. The height of this tower varies among sources, some saying it was 38 feet (12 m) high, while others claim it was only 27 feet (8.2 m). The cost of this tower's construction was $10,000. In 1890 a lightkeeper's house was constructed at a cost of $3,000; it was demolished in 1962, and only remnants of its foundation can be discerned. The tower itself was replaced in 1891 by a new brick tower 28 feet (8.5 m) high, with a cast iron lantern house, and a fog bell was also added to the facility. The fog station was destroyed by the 1938 New England Hurricane, and was not replaced. The light was automated in 1941, and In 1967 a fourth-order Fresnel lens was installed. The station continues to be an aid to navigation; the facilities are managed by the Cuttyhunk Historical Society. The lightstation was listed on the National Register of Historic Places in 1987.

== See also ==
- National Register of Historic Places listings in Dukes County, Massachusetts
