= Mount Sod =

Mountain in Massachusetts

- Location within Massachusetts Location within the United States

Highest point
- Elevation: 23 ft (7.0 m)
- Coordinates: 41°30′22″N 70°41′18″W

Geography
- Location: Martha's Vineyard, Massachusetts
- Topo map: USGS Woods Hole

Mount Sod is a mountain in Dukes County, Massachusetts. It is east of Monsod Bay on Nonamesset Island.
