= Naushon Island =

Island in the United States of America

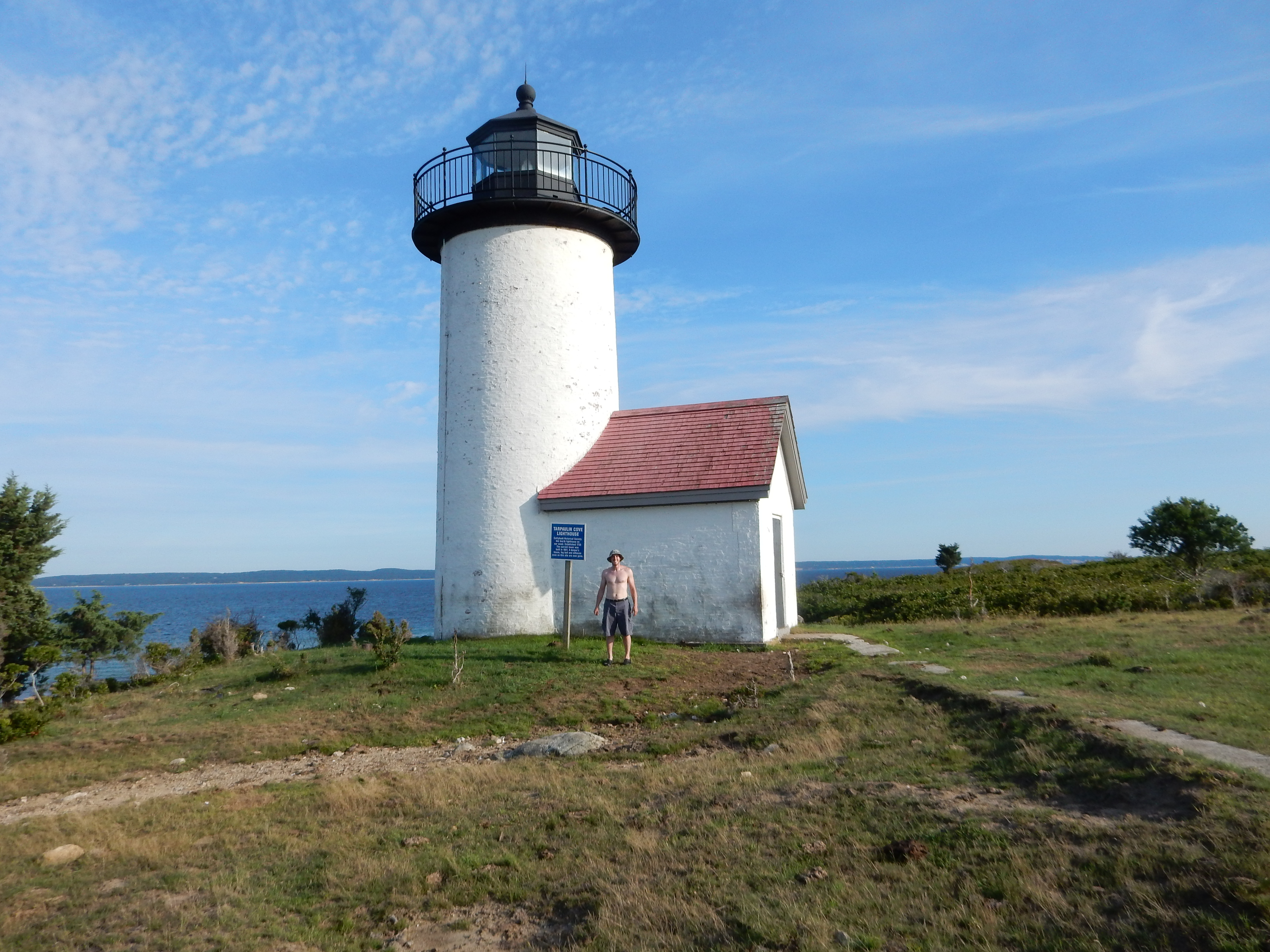
- Tarpaulin Cove light house on Naushon Island

- Location of Naushon Island within Massachusetts Naushon Island (the United States)

Geography
- Location: Elizabeth Islands
- Coordinates: 41.4964979°N 70.7072523°W
- Total islands: 1
- Area: 7.4 sq mi (19 km^{2})

Administration
- United States
- State: Massachusetts
- County: Dukes County
- Town: Gosnold

Demographics
- Population: 30 (2000)

Additional information
- Postal code: 02713
- Area code: 508 / 774

Naushon Island is the largest of the Elizabeth Islands in southeastern Massachusetts. It is part of the town of Gosnold, Massachusetts, and is owned by the Forbes family. As of the 2000 census, the island had a permanent population of 30 people.

The island is seven miles (11 km) long and 7.4 square miles in land area (19.18 km^{2}). It is separated from Cape Cod by a narrow strait and the smaller islands of Uncatena and Nonamesset, and is located four statute miles (6 km) northwest of Martha's Vineyard.

== History ==
=== Early ownership ===
Along with the rest of the Elizabeth Islands, Naushon Island was under British jurisdiction following its discovery in 1602 by Bartholomew Gosnold. At this time, Naushon was named "Cataymucke" by the Native Americans inhabiting the island. In 1654, Thomas Mayhew, and his son, John Mayhew, deprived the Native Americans’ of their own land by claiming to buy out their shares of the island, that knew of no shareholders. During the Mayhew's ownership of the island, the name switched from Cataymucke to Elizabeth's Island, to Tarpaulin Cove Island. This family owned the island until 1682, when Matthew Mayhew sold the island to Wait Winthrop. While he never lived on the island, during Winthrop's ownership, the island was renamed Winthrop's Island. In 1730, upon John Winthrop's death, the island was sold to James Bowdoin III.

=== Bowdoin family ownership ===
James Bowdoin III (1752–1811), son of Massachusetts' governor James Bowdoin II (1726–1790), was appointed by President Thomas Jefferson to serve as the U.S. plenipotentiary to Spain. James III owned a beautiful estate at "Nashaun Island," according to Thomas Bridgman who in 1856 published The Pilgrims of Massachusetts and Their Descendants. Bridgman also notes that Bowdoin was "among the very earliest as well as largest importers of the pure Merino stock and took great pains in improving his own flocks and inculcating the importance of doing so upon others". This interest may have led to the wool sample found among Thomas Jefferson's papers. Jefferson's note reads "Specimen of Mr. Bowdoin's wool, from American sheep raised on his Island of "Nanshaw". The note has been digitized and is available for viewing in the Library of Congress American Memories Collection [1], indexed as "Hackley and Bowdoin, no date, wool samples".

Naushon remained in the Bowdoin family for 113 years, during which time the imported sheep population on the island raised from several hundred during the Winthrop ownership to approximately 2,000. This population greatly decreased during the American Revolution when 100 British soldiers landed on the island. Naushon then became an overlooking point of the U.S. militia, which served to push the inhabitants into poverty by the end of the revolution.

Years after the end of the revolution, the Bowdoin family returned to the island after having built a house on it in 1809. This house was known as The Mansion House.

=== Forbes family ownership ===
Naushon Island has been a Forbes family retreat for more than a century and a half, since its purchase by John Murray Forbes. Forbes was a businessman who began his career in his family's opium and tea trading business in China, and made much of his fortune by investing in the early development of railroads. Naushon Island was purchased by Forbes and a business associate, William W. Swain, in 1842, and Forbes purchased Swain's share soon after to become the sole owner. Upon his death in 1898, Forbes left Naushon in a trust administered by his 5 surviving children and it is now owned by Naushon Island Trust, Inc. Pasque Island and Nashawena Island, the next two islands in the Elizabeth Island chain, were purchased at different times by J. M. Forbes' descendants and remain privately owned. There are approximately 35 houses on Naushon, most near the east end.

== Topography ==
Naushon and the smaller islands that surround it, Uncatena, Nonamesset, Monohansett, Bull, Cedar, Bachelor, Veckatimest, Weepecket, and some smaller ones, are private property and closed to the public. Despite largely being private property, there are several public areas: Kettle Cove, West Beach, and Tarpaulin Cove, and Weepeckit Island, which is off the north shore of Naushon, in Buzzards Bay.

Opening to the east northeast, Hadley Harbor, on the east end of Naushon, is relatively deep and is well protected from storms. At the mouth of Hadley Harbor, Bull Island is open to picnickers. Other bays include Inner Harbor, Lackeys Bay, Monsod Bay, and Northwest Gutter.

On Naushon, there are no paved roads. Instead, there are many miles of trails through the mostly beech woods. Notably, a lighthouse sits above Tarpaulin Cove.

== Gallery ==
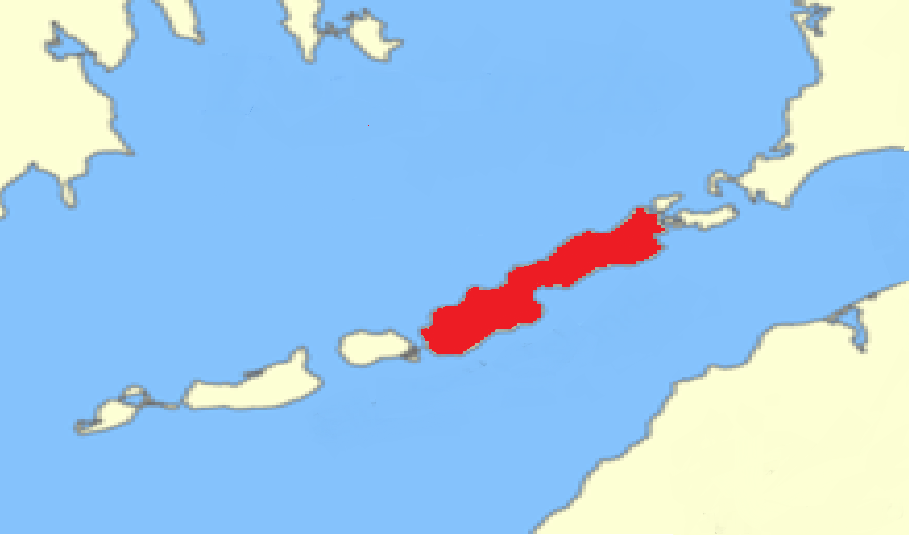
The location of Naushon Island within the Elizabeth Islands.

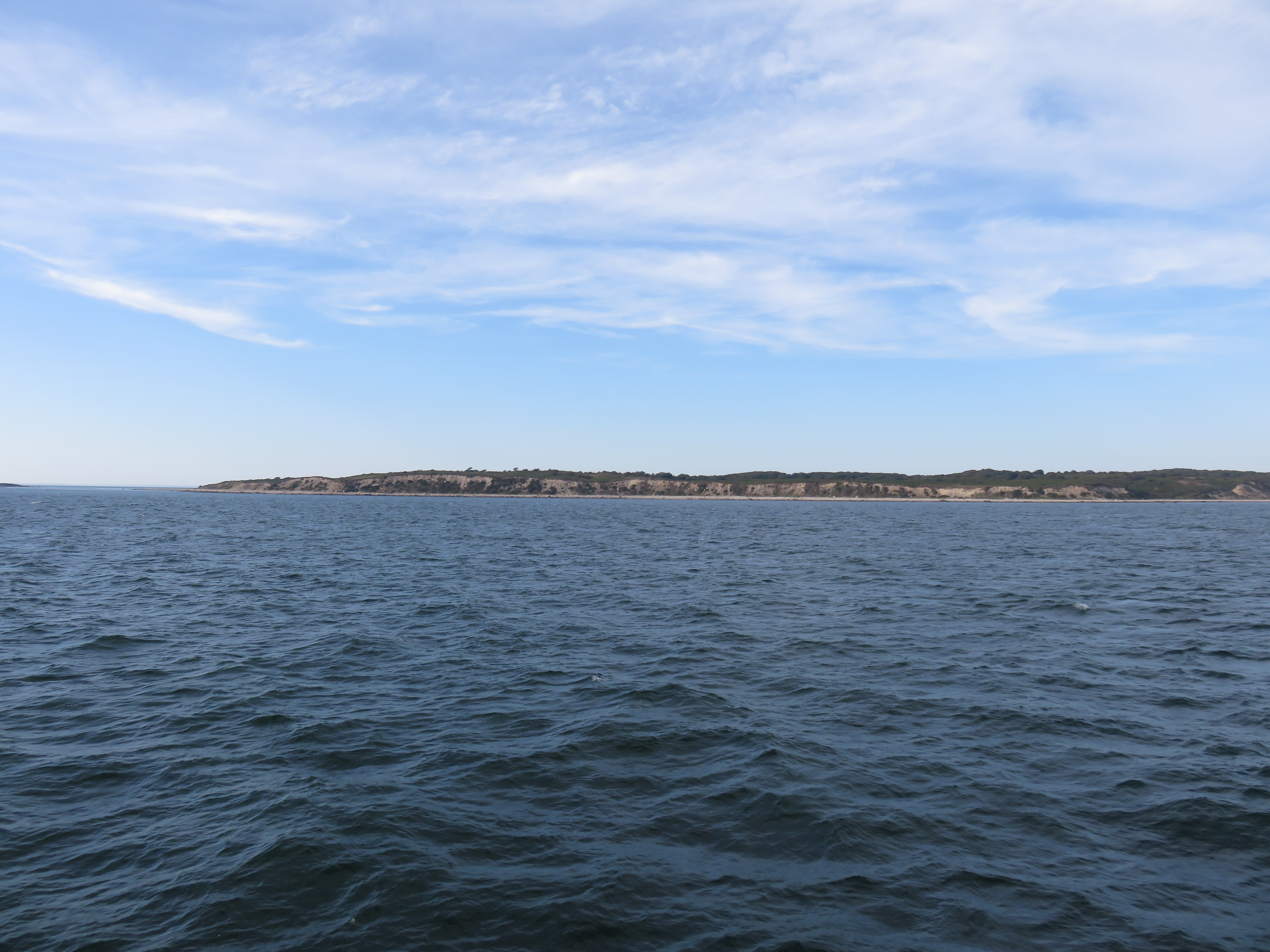
Southwestern end of Naushon Island in 2015
