= Gull Island (Massachusetts) =

Island in Dukes County, Massachusetts, United States

Coordinates: 41°26′45″N 70°54′23″W

Gull Island is a small island located just off the southeast coast of Penikese Island. It is part of the Elizabeth Islands and is entirely part of the town of Gosnold in Dukes County, Massachusetts. At one point it contained the Gull Island Bomb Area, a United States Navy bombing range. It is currently uninhabited.

== See also ==
- Gosnold, Massachusetts
- List of military installations in Massachusetts
