= Cedar Island (Dukes County, Massachusetts) =

Island in Dukes County, Massachusetts, United States

- Location within Massachusetts Location within the United States

Geography
- Coordinates: 41°30′18″N 70°41′52″W
- Archipelago: Elizabeth Islands
- Total islands: 1

Administration
- United States
- State: Massachusetts
- County: Dukes County

Cedar Island is one of the Elizabeth Islands between Monohansett Island and Nonamesset Island. It is located in Dukes County, Massachusetts, 2.3 miles (3.7 km) southwest of Woods Hole in the Town of Gosnold. The island has been known as Cedar Island due to the profusion of small cedars that grow on it. On 1911 C&GS Charts it is named "East Buck Island".
