= Monohansett Island =

Island in Dukes County, Massachusetts, United States

- Location within Massachusetts Location within the United States

Geography
- Location: Off northeast end of Naushon Island
- Coordinates: 41°30′14″N 70°42′11″W
- Archipelago: Elizabeth Islands
- Total islands: 1
- Highest elevation: 7 ft (2.1 m)

Administration
- United States
- State: Massachusetts
- County: Dukes County
- Town: Gosnold

Additional information
- Postal code: 02713
- Area code: 508 / 774

Monohansett Island is one of the Elizabeth Islands between Cedar Island and Naushon Island. It is located in Dukes County, Massachusetts, just east of Naushon Island and 2 miles (3.2 km) southwest of Woods Hole in the Town of Gosnold. The name is of Indian origin that goes back to the close of the seventeenth century.
