= Robert Swain Gifford =

American landscape painter (1840–1905)

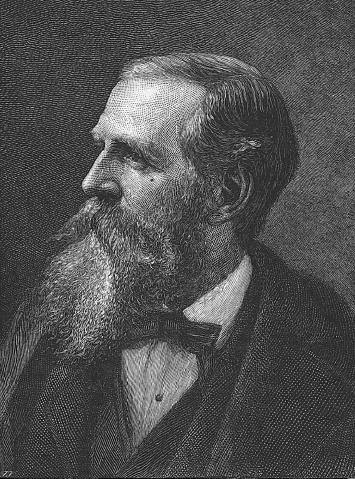
- Portrait of Robert Swain Gifford published in The American Art Review, August 1880
- Born: 23 December 1840; Nonamesset Island, US
- Died: 15 January 1905 (aged 64)
- Known for: Painter
- Movement: Barbizon school

Robert Swain Gifford (December 23, 1840 – January 15, 1905) was an American landscape painter. He was influenced by the Barbizon school and became a member of the Society of American Artists.

== Early life and education ==
Gifford was born on Nonamesset Island, in the Elizabeth Islands, When he was 2 he moved with his family to the New Bedford area, and he attended public schools in New Bedford. When Gifford was a teen, the Dutch painter Albertus Van Beest arrived in New Bedford, and the two collaborated on ship paintings.

== Career ==
Gifford opened a studio in Boston in 1864. Two years later he moved to New York City. In 1867 he was named an Associate of the National Academy of Design and in 1878 he became a full member. He travelled and painted in Oregon and California, then left for Europe, where he visited Great Britain, France, Italy and Spain. Before returning to the U.S. he travelled to Morocco and Egypt. He was joined by fellow artists such as Louis Comfort Tiffany, and painted some subjects from those regions. Much of his work focuses on the landscapes of New England. He, along with Victorian contemporaries from the White Mountain and Hudson River Schools, painted the majestic cliffs of Grand Manan in the Bay of Fundy. His painting from the island, Pettes Cove, is illustrative of his marine work. In 1867, he was elected into the National Academy of Design as an Associate member and became a full member in 1878.

In 1876 he was a medal winner at the Philadelphia Centennial Exhibition and at the International Exposition in Paris in 1889. In 1899, he was an artist on the Harriman Alaska Expedition. Gifford died at his home in New York City in 1905.

Some of his works hang in the most prominent galleries in the US, including the Fine Arts Museums of San Francisco, the Metropolitan Museum of Art, New York, and the Smithsonian American Art Museum, Washington DC. He was a member of the Society of American Artists.

== Gallery ==
=== Oil paintings ===
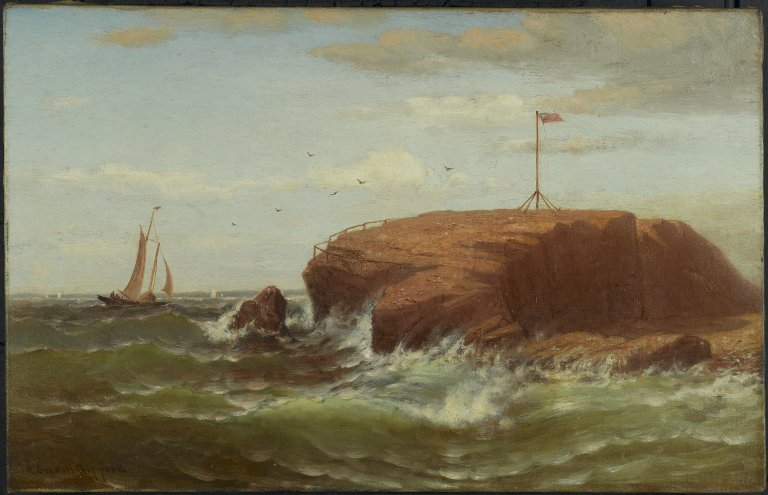
Seconnet Rock, New Bedford, Massachusetts (circa 1865) oil on canvas, 36 cm × 56.3 cm (14.2 in × 22.2 in), Brooklyn Museum, New York City

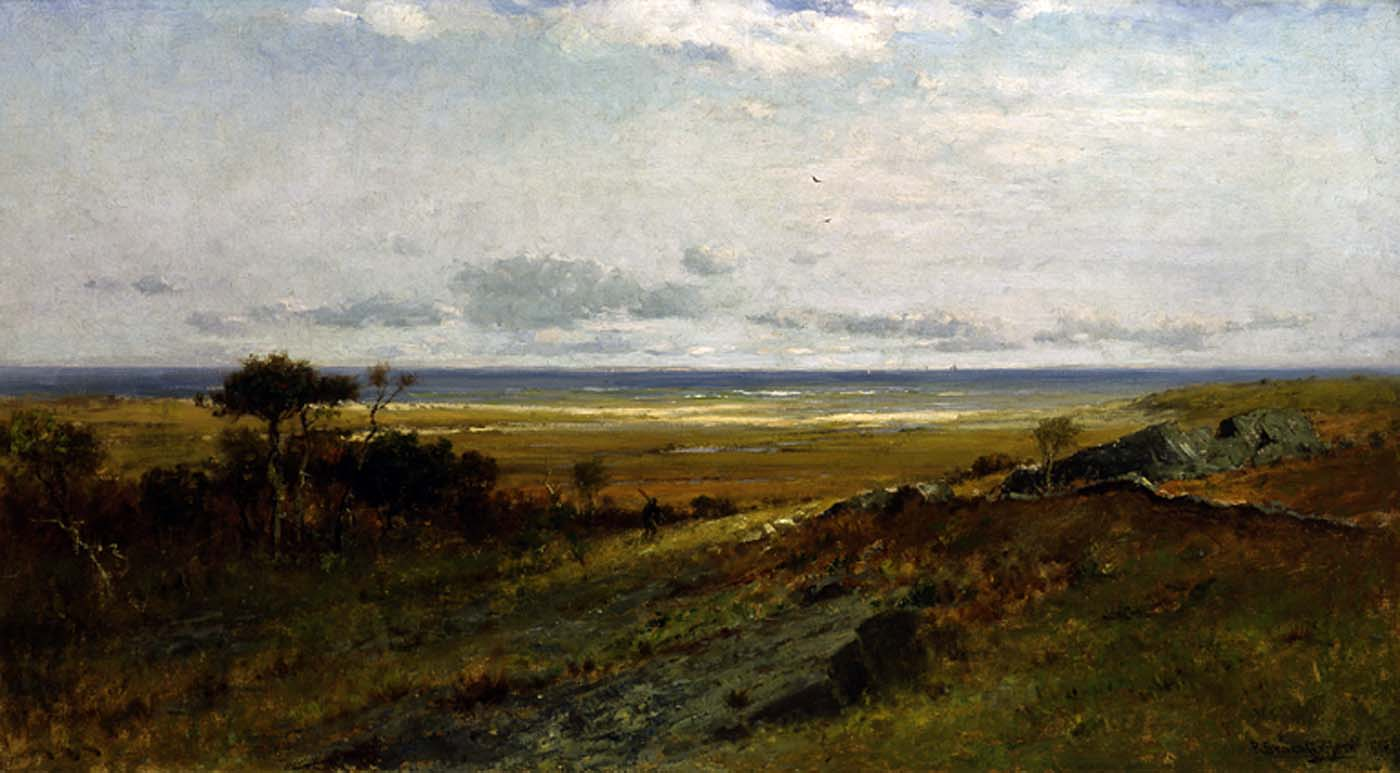
Near the Ocean (1879) oil on canvas, 57.1 cm × 102.8 cm (22.5 in × 40.5 in), Smithsonian American Art Museum, Washington D.C.

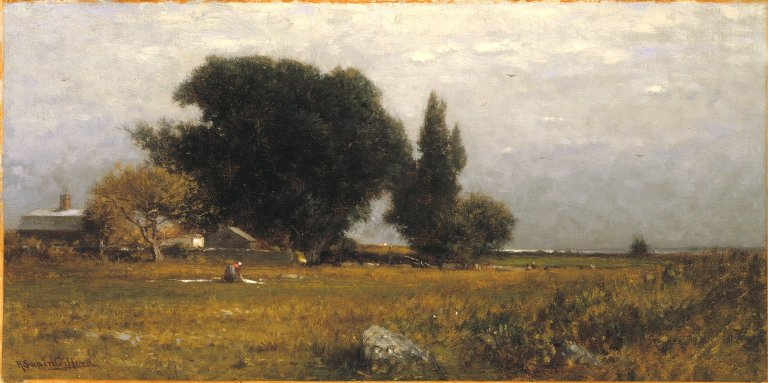
Trees and Meadow (circa 1885) oil on canvas, 30.3 cm × 60.6 cm (11.9 in × 23.9 in), Brooklyn Museum, New York City

=== Prints ===
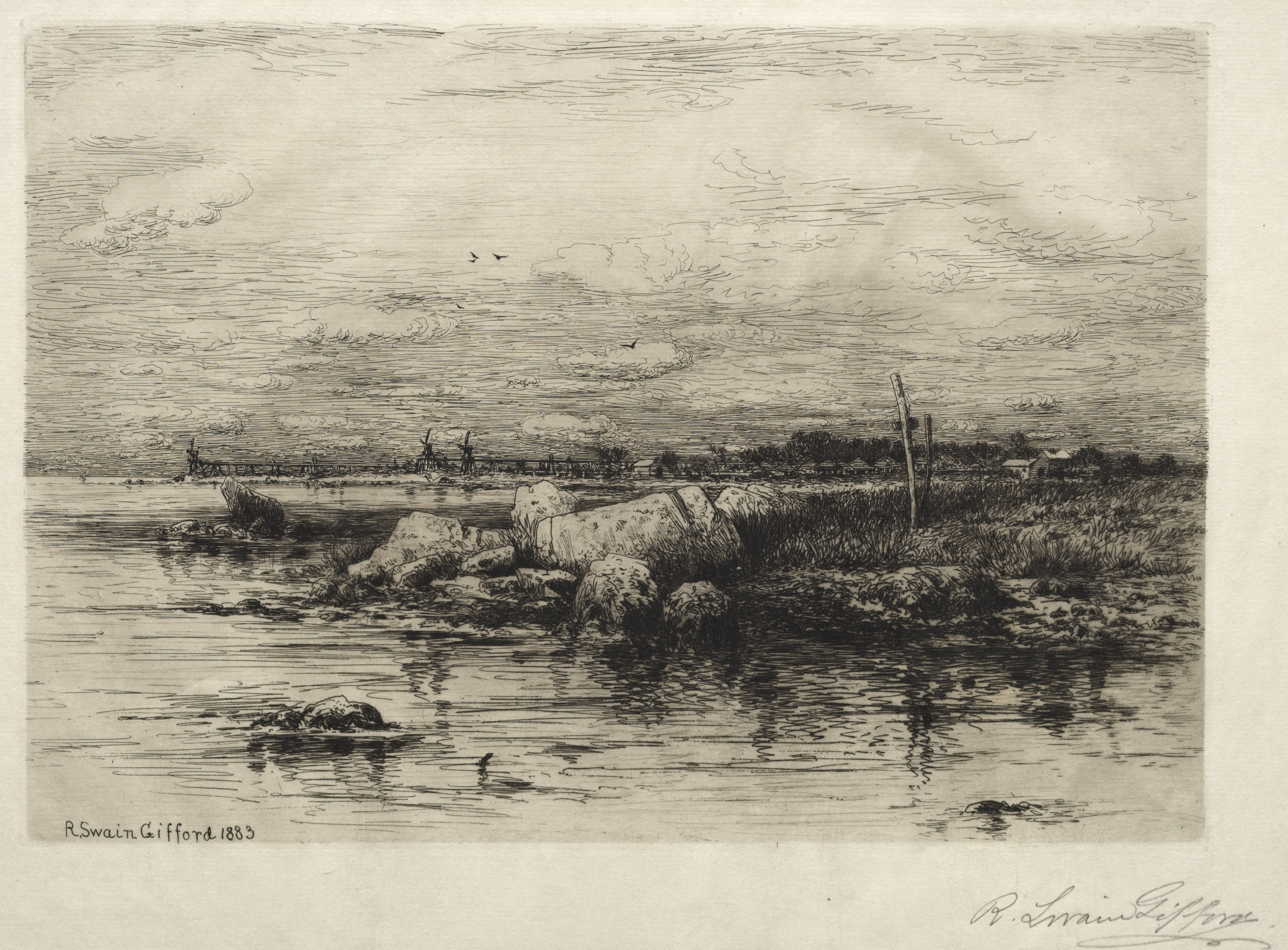
Mouth of the Apponaganasett River (1883) etching, plate size 18.9 x 28.8 cm (7 7/16 x 11 5/16 in.), Cleveland Museum of Art, Cleveland, Ohio

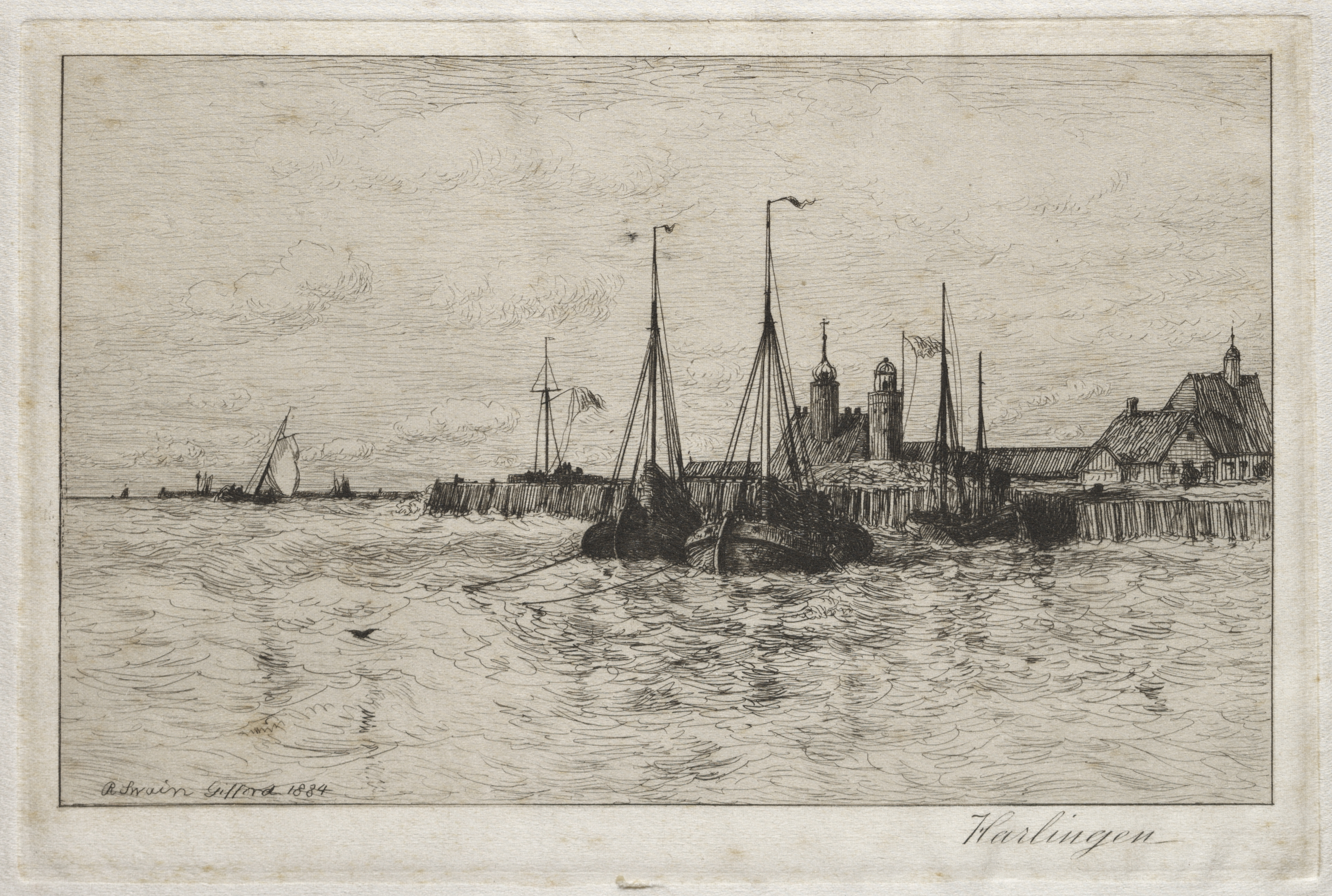
Harlingen (1884) etching, size unknown, Cleveland Museum of Art, Cleveland, Ohio

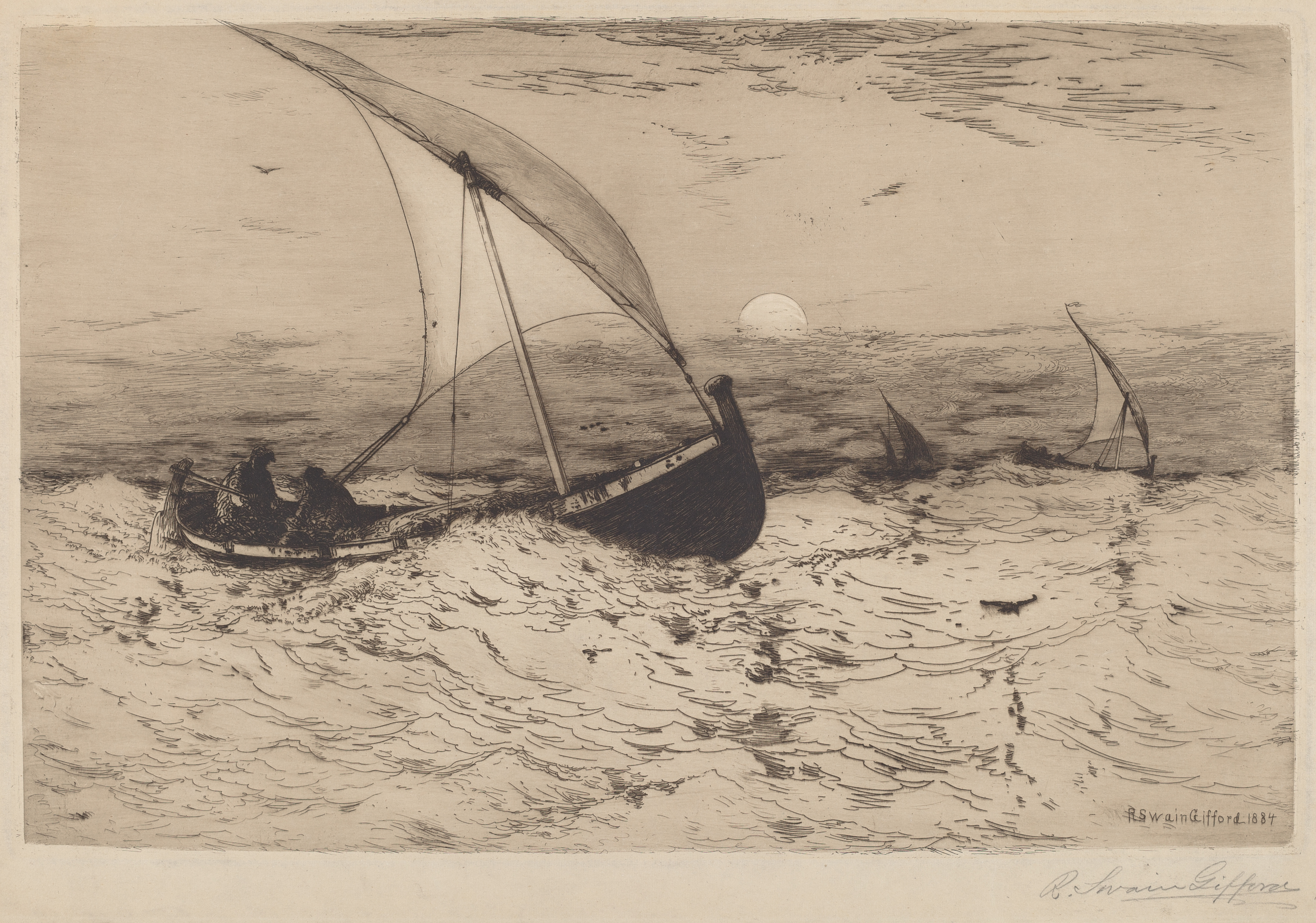
Neapolitan Fishing Boats Returning Home (1884) etching and drypoint, plate size 27.6 cm × 43 cm (10.9 in × 16.9 in), National Gallery of Art, Washington, D.C.

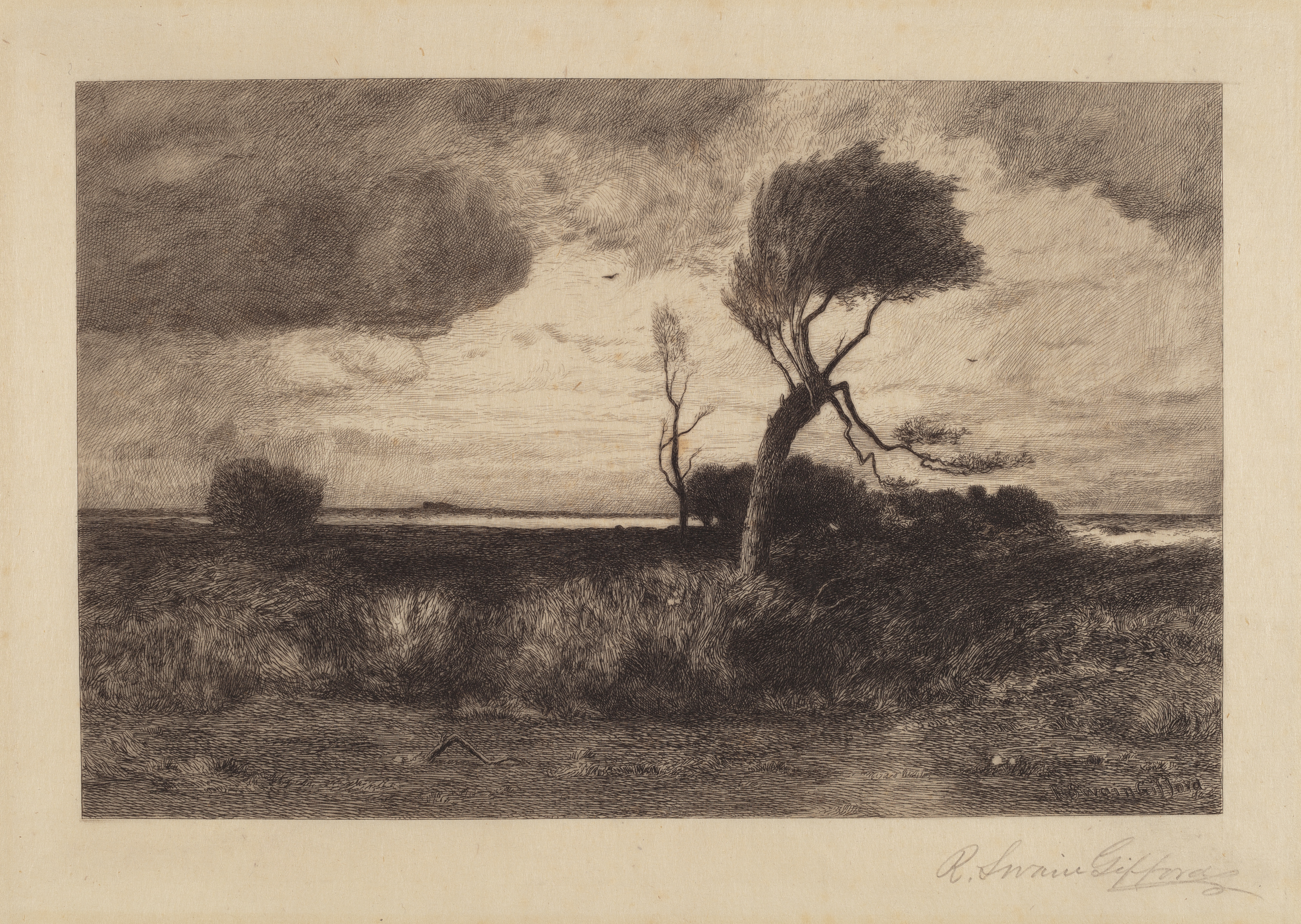
Near the Coast, large plate (1886) etching, plate: 17.4 × 27.1 cm (6 7/8 × 10 11/16 in.), National Gallery of Art, Washington, D.C.
