= Tarpaulin Cove =

Body of water in Massachusetts

- Location of Tarpaulin Cove within Massachusetts Tarpaulin Cove (the United States)
- Coordinates: 41.4751090°N 70.7550304°W
- Part of: Vineyard Sound

Tarpaulin Cove is a bay in Dukes County, Massachusetts. It is located on Naushon Island 0.8 miles (1.3 km) east of Kettle Cove and northeast of Robinson's Hole in the Town of Gosnold.
