= Veckatimest Island =

Island off Cape Cod, Massachusetts, USA

- Location within Massachusetts Location within the United States

Geography
- Location: Off the northeast end of Naushon Island
- Coordinates: 41°30′27″N 70°41′58″W
- Archipelago: Elizabeth Islands
- Total islands: 1
- Area: .026 sq mi (0.067 km^{2})
- Highest elevation: 20 ft (6 m)

Administration
- United States
- State: Massachusetts
- County: Dukes County

Demographics
- Population: 0 (2000)

Additional information
- Postal code: 02713
- Area code: 508 / 774

Veckatimest Island is one of the Elizabeth Islands, part of the town of Gosnold in Dukes County, Massachusetts, United States. It used to be known as "East Buck." The island has a land area of 0.0675 square kilometres (0.0261 sq mi; 16.7 acres) and was uninhabited as of the 2000 census.

The island received further recognition after Brooklyn band Grizzly Bear named their third studio album after it. The band's founding member, Ed Droste, is connected to the Forbes family, who own Naushon Island, through his mother Diana Forbes.

== History ==
Veckatimest Island, formerly known as "East Buck" to some, was claimed as one of the many Elizabeth Islands by the colonist and explorer, Bartholomew Gosnold, in 1602. Prior to Gosnold's arrival, the islands were used by the local indigenous population, specifically the Wampanoag peoples.

According to a history of the area collected by Amelia Forbes Emerson, notable structures built on the island include Veckatimest House, built by Dorothea Hughes Simmons in 1932, and Veckatimest Barn, of an uncertain origin, but remodeled and made habitable in 1947.
