= West Island (Massachusetts) =

Island in Massachusetts, United States

Coordinates: 41°35′47.7″N 70°49′57.5″W

West Island is an island in Fairhaven, Massachusetts, United States, on Buzzards Bay. Approximately two-thirds of the island is reserved for the wildlife. Water and sewage restrictions have limited its growth. Fairhaven is located in southeastern Bristol County, near the city of New Bedford.
