= Weepecket Islands =

Islands in Massachusetts, United States

- Location within Massachusetts Location within the United States

Geography
- Location: North of Naushon Island
- Coordinates: 41°31′00″N 70°44′08″W
- Archipelago: Elizabeth Islands
- Total islands: 3
- Highest elevation: 2 ft (0.6 m)

Administration
- United States
- State: Massachusetts
- County: Dukes County
- Town: Gosnold

Additional information
- Postal code: 02713
- Area code: 508 / 774

The Weepecket Islands are a group of three islands which are part of the Elizabeth Islands of Dukes County, Massachusetts, United States. They are located off the north shore of Naushon Island, the largest of the Elizabeth Islands. Together the three Weepeckets have a land area of 0.051 km^{2} (0.020 mi^{2}; 13 acres). The islands were used as a United States Navy practice target range (the Weepecket Island Bomb Area) for bombs, rockets, and machine guns from 1941 to 1957.

Today, the islands are uninhabited. and are a popular breeding ground for double-crested cormorants.

== See also ==
- List of military installations in Massachusetts
