= Pasque Island =

Island in Dukes County, Massachusetts, United States

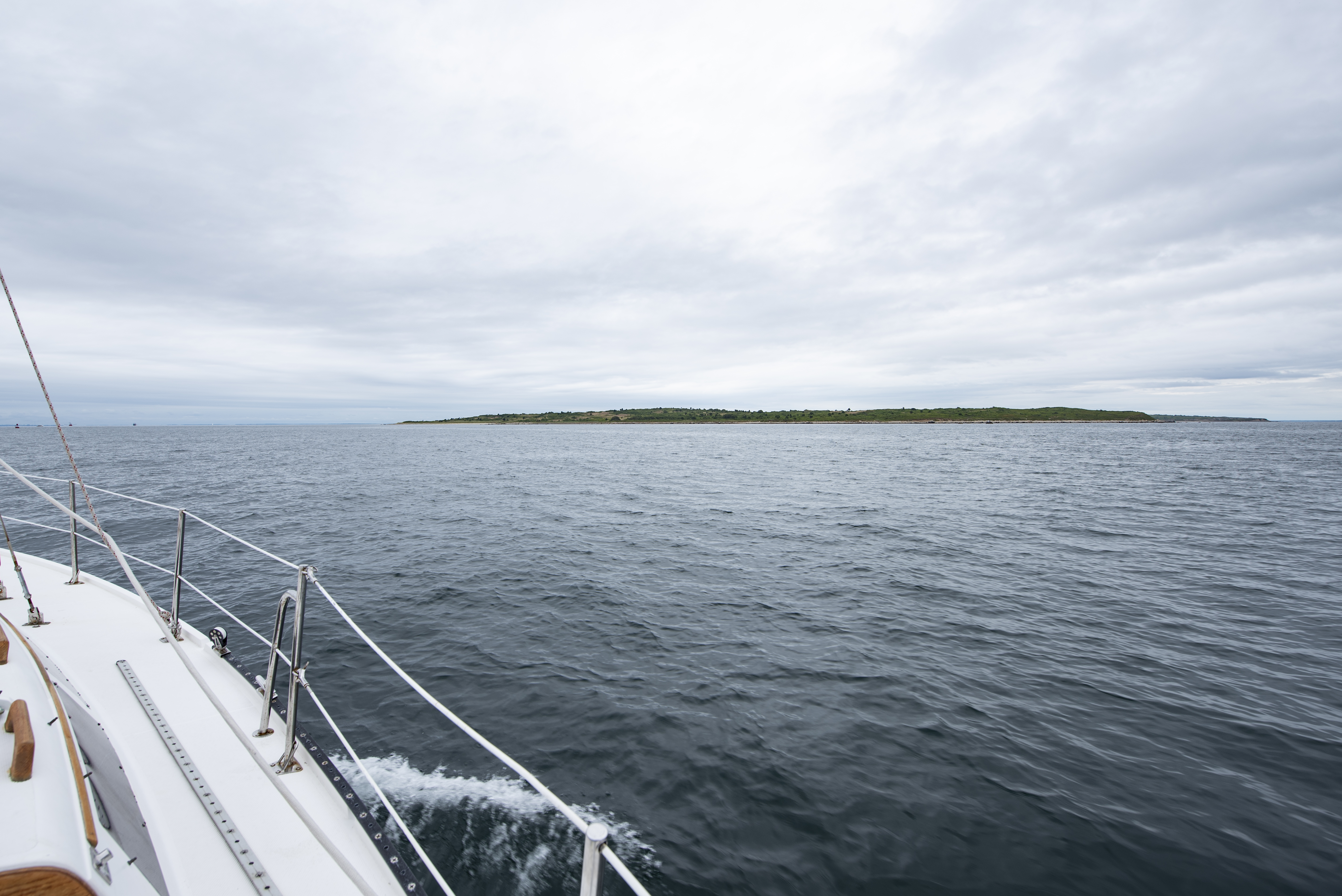
- Pasque Island from Quicks Hole

- Location within Massachusetts Location within the United States

Geography
- Location: Between Naushon Island and Nashawena Island
- Coordinates: 41°27′02″N 70°49′36″W
- Archipelago: Elizabeth Islands
- Total islands: 1
- Area: 1.333 sq mi (3.45 km^{2})
- Highest elevation: 52 ft (15.8 m)

Administration
- United States
- State: Massachusetts
- County: Dukes County
- Town: Gosnold

Demographics
- Population: 0 (2000)

Additional information
- Postal code: 02713
- Area code: 508 / 774

Pasque Island is one of the Elizabeth Islands of Dukes County, Massachusetts, United States. It lies between Nashawena Island to the west and Naushon Island to the east. The island has a land area of 3.45 km^{2} (1.333 sq mi or 853 acres) and had a population of 2 persons as of the 2000 census. The island is part of the town of Gosnold, Massachusetts. It is owned by the Forbes family.
