= Elizabeth Islands =

Island group in Massachusetts, USA

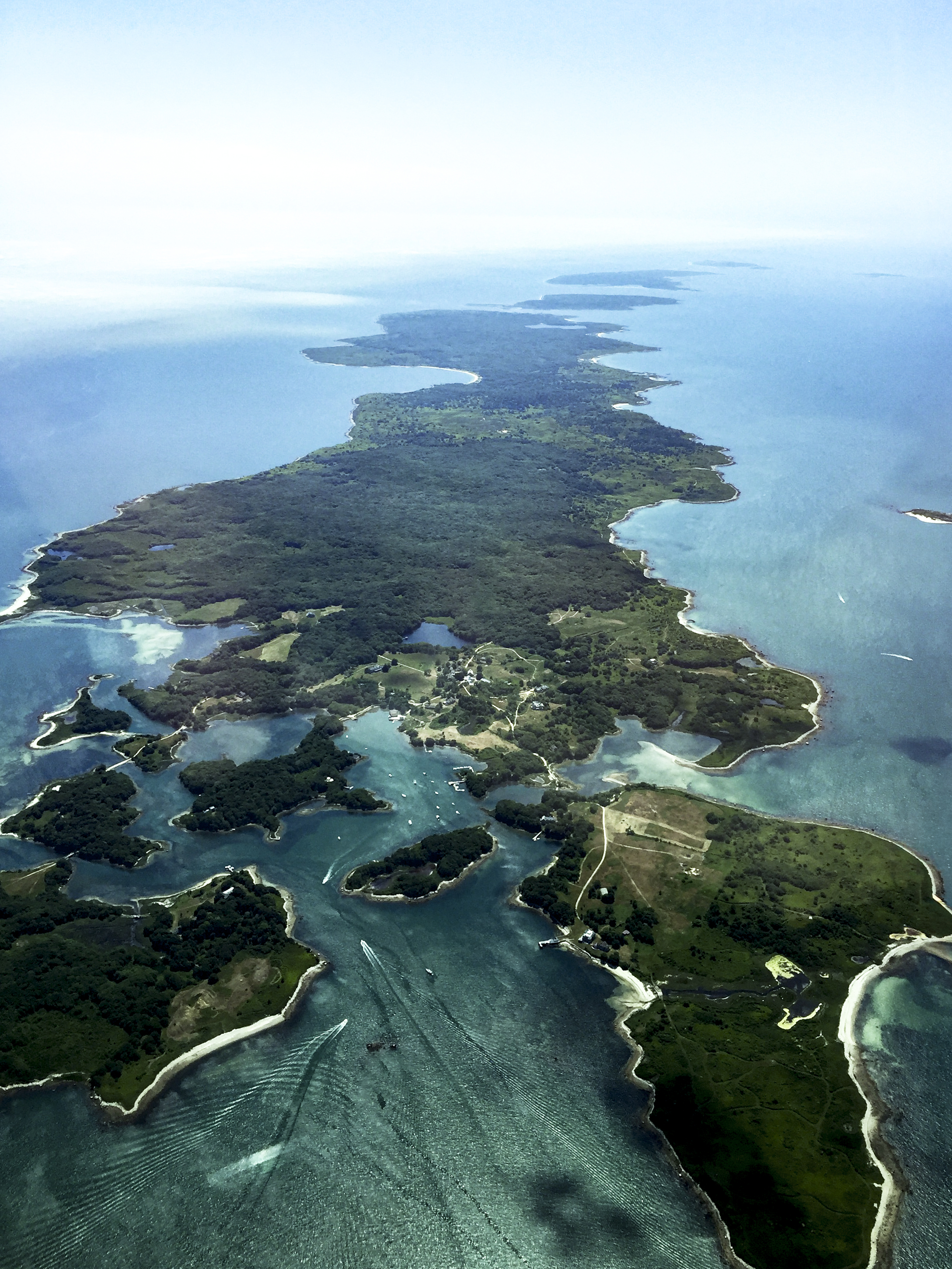
- Elizabeth Islands looking southwest with Uncatena and Nonamesset Islands in foreground

- Location within Massachusetts Location within the United States

Geography
- Location: Between Buzzards Bay and Vineyard Sound
- Coordinates: 41°28′30″N 70°46′0″W
- Archipelago: Elizabeth Islands
- Total islands: 18
- Major islands: Cuttyhunk, Gull, Monohansett Island, Nashawena, Naushon, Nonamesset Island, Pasque, Penikese, Uncatena, Veckatimest Island, Weepecket Islands, and six others
- Area: 13.2 sq mi (34 km^{2})
- Highest elevation: 26 m (85 ft)

Administration
- United States
- State: Massachusetts
- County: Dukes
- Town: Gosnold
- Largest settlement: Village of Cuttyhunk (pop. 52)

Demographics
- Population: 70 (2020)

Additional information
- Postal code: 02713
- Area code: 508 / 774
- Official website: https://www.townofgosnold.org

The Elizabeth Islands is an archipelago extending southwest from Cape Cod. They include over 20 small islands located at the outer edge of Buzzards Bay, north of Martha's Vineyard from which they are separated by Vineyard Sound. The Elizabeth Islands constitute the town of Gosnold in Dukes County, Massachusetts, based on the outermost island of Cuttyhunk, where most of the year-round population resides. All islands except for Cuttyhunk and Penikese are privately owned by the Forbes family.

== History ==
The islands were formed by different gravels and soils entombed inside of glaciers. The glacial movement deposited much material as they melted, thus many small islands were formed.

The islands were long known to and utilized by the Wampanoag and other indigenous peoples before European colonization. They utilized the islands for hunting and fishing. The Indigenous name, Pocutohhunkunnoh, meaning Lands End, was the inspiration for the name Cuttyhunk Island.

Europeans first learned of the islands in 1602 when the English explorer Bartholomew Gosnold sighted them on his way to Virginia. For three weeks, they built shelter and rested on the islands. However, it was not until 1641, subsequent to the successful establishment of the first English North American colonies, that colonizers formally laid claim to and settled the islands in the name of the English Crown as part of the country's nascent imperial expansion. At this time they renamed the islands after Elizabeth I, who had been Queen of England when the islands had first been discovered by Europeans. They named Cuttyhunk Elizabeth's Isle. King James the First gave the islands to the Council of New England because he did not care to have them. In 1641, Thomas Mayhew the Elder, of Watertown, Massachusetts, bought the islands—along with Nantucket and Martha's Vineyard—from William Alexander, the Earl of Stirling. James Bowdoin and his family owned the islands for over 100 years beginning in the 1700s. Finally the islands were bought by the Forbes family in the 1800s.

Before the creation of the Province of Massachusetts Bay in 1691, the islands were part of the extinct Dukes County, New York. The first known European inhabitant was Francis Usselton, who had been banished at the time for making secret trades with the local Indians without consent from the governor.

Since the mid-1800s, the Forbes family, in the form of a family trust, own much of the island's property.

== Geography and demographics ==
The total land area of the islands is 34.2 km² (13.2 mi²). The 2020 census recorded a permanent population of 70 people in the town of Gosnold, making it the least populous town in Massachusetts.

=== Named islands ===
All of the Elizabeth Islands, except Cuttyhunk and Penikese, are privately owned by the Forbes family. However, the Forbes family have other beaches open for public access including: Weepecket, Kettle Cove, West End Beach, Quicks Hole and Tarpaulin Cove.

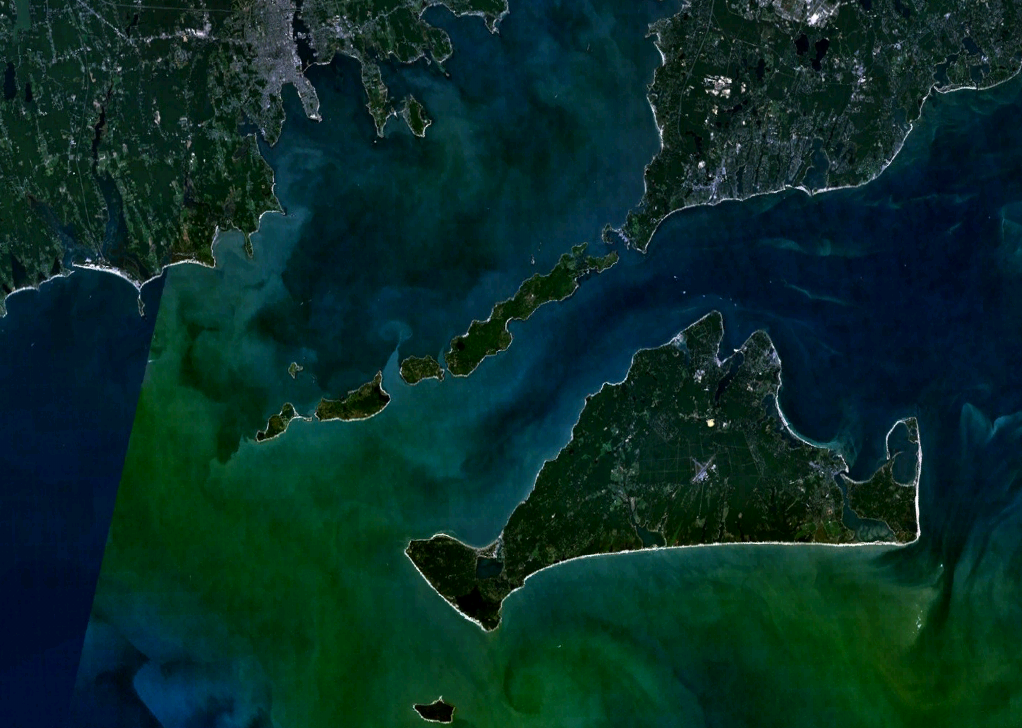
Satellite image of Elizabeth Islands and Martha's Vineyard

Stretching south-west from land's end at Falmouth, Massachusetts, the islands are:

- Pine Island, a rocky islet off Nonamesset Island.
- Nonamesset Island, the closest large island to the mainland. On the northern end of the island, boats can anchor in Hadley Harbor even though the island is off limits to the public. Boats will often also anchor on the outer harbor due to crowds.
- Bull Island, off Uncatena Island.
- Goats Neck, connected to Naushon Island by a land bridge.
- Veckatimest, a small island. The band Grizzly Bear named one of their albums off the island.
- Buck Island, between Naushon Island and Veckatimest Island.
- Cedar Island, a small island in Lackeys Bay.
- Uncatena Island, uninhabited as of the 2000 Census. The island is owned by the Forbes Family and is private. In the early 20th century a sidewheeler steamer ferry used the island's name in theirs, Sidewheeler Uncatena. The ferry took people between New Bedford, Martha's Vineyard, and Nantucket and was the last of its kind.
- Monohansett Island, south of Buck Island in Lackeys Bay.
- Bachelor Island, an ephemeral sandbar off Naushon Island in Lackeys Bay.
- Naushon Island, 5.5 miles (8.9 km) long and the largest. Composed of the main island along with the smaller Nonamesset, Monohansett, Bull, Cedar, and Bachelor islands. Owned by the Forbes' Naushon Island Trust, and while it is not generally open to the public, the Forbes family has set aside Tarpaulin Cove to the south and Kettle Cove to the north as well as Bull Island and Hadley Harbor to the northeast for public enjoyment including picknicking.
- Weepecket Islands, three small, publicly accessible islands north of central Naushon owned by the Forbes family. These islands offer very few places to land, are nearly obscured by water, and are home to numerous shore birds, seals and other animals.
- Pasque Island, 1.5 miles (2.4 km) long, owned by a subset of the Forbes family, and covered in poison ivy. A shallow tidal creek cuts part way through the island.
- Nashawena Island, 3 miles (4.8 km) long, owned by another subset of the Forbes family, it has grazing livestock.
- Baret Island, located off the north shore of Nashawena Island.
- Rock Island, located off the north shore of Nashawena Island.
- Gull Island, a small uninhabited island.
- Penikese Island, located about 0.5 miles (0.80 km) north of Nashawena and Cuttyhunk. Penikese is owned by the Commonwealth of Massachusetts and has a colorful history. It was the site of a groundbreaking 19th-century research facility that was the precursor to the famed Marine Biological Laboratory (MBL) in Woods Hole, was the site of the state's only leper colony in the early 20th century, and is currently a bird sanctuary and site of the Penikese Island School, an experiential environmental education center.
- Cuttyhunk Island, farthest west in the chain, and home to most of Gosnold's municipal population. Like Penikese, Cuttyhunk is not owned by the Forbes family, and therefore much of the island is publicly accessible.
- Slates Island, located in Cuttyhunk Pond.
- Gosnold Island, located in Westend Pond on Cuttyhunk Island.

=== Named channels ===
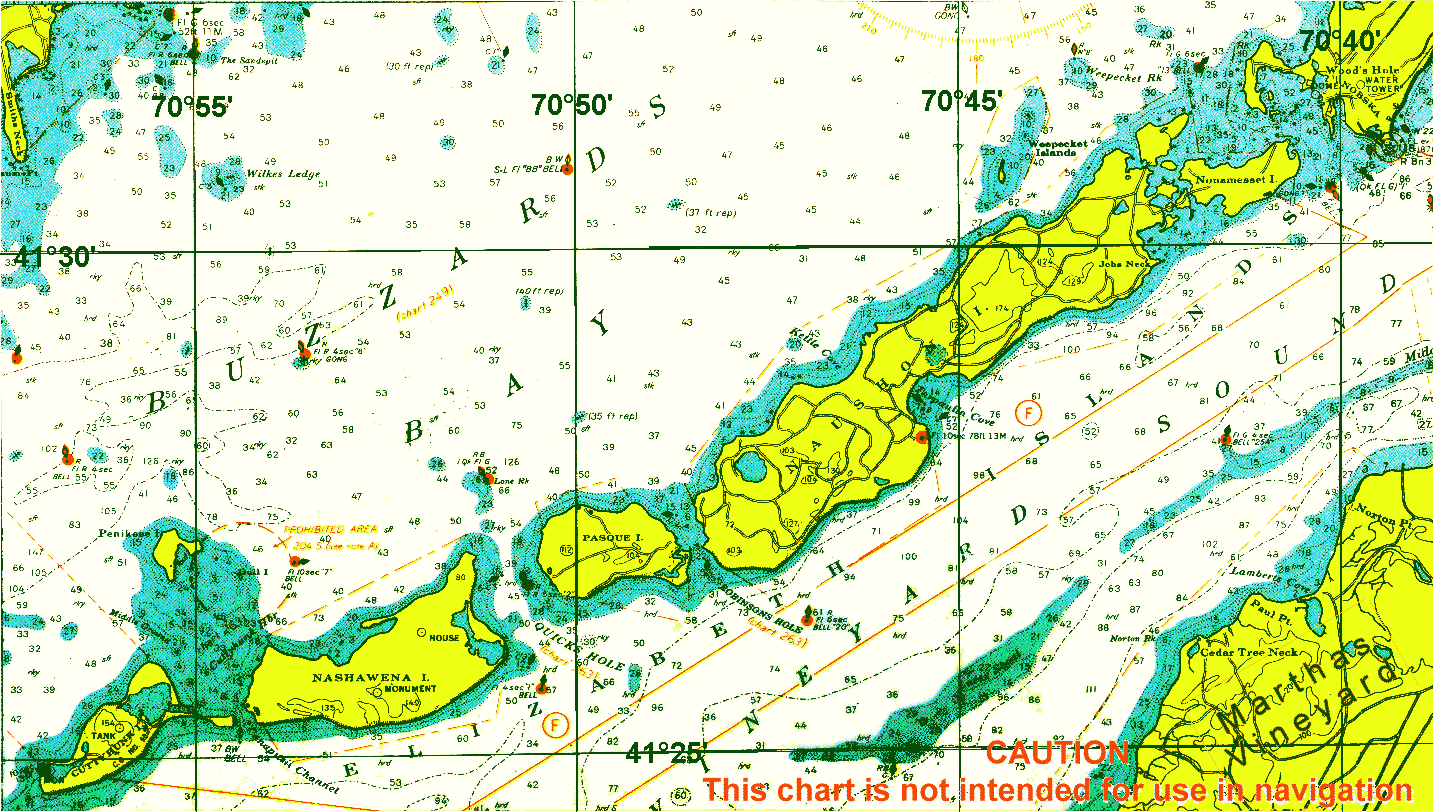
Nautical chart, Elizabeth Islands with Buzzards Bay and Vineyard Sound

Channels with strong tidal currents, known locally as holes, separate the islands from each other and the mainland. Currents of up to 6 knots (11 km/h) are driven by the different sizes and filling rates of Vineyard Sound to the southeast and Buzzards Bay to the northwest. At high tide, water flows from Buzzards Bay to the Vineyard Sound. Near mid-tide the water stops and reverses, filling the Bay at low tide.

Listed from northeast to southwest, the named channels are:

- Woods Hole separating the mainland from Nonamesset Island
- Robinson's Hole between Naushon Island and Pasque Island
- Quick's Hole between Pasque Island and Nashawena Island
- Canapitsit Channel between Nashawena Island and Cuttyhunk Island.

=== Named harbors and coves ===
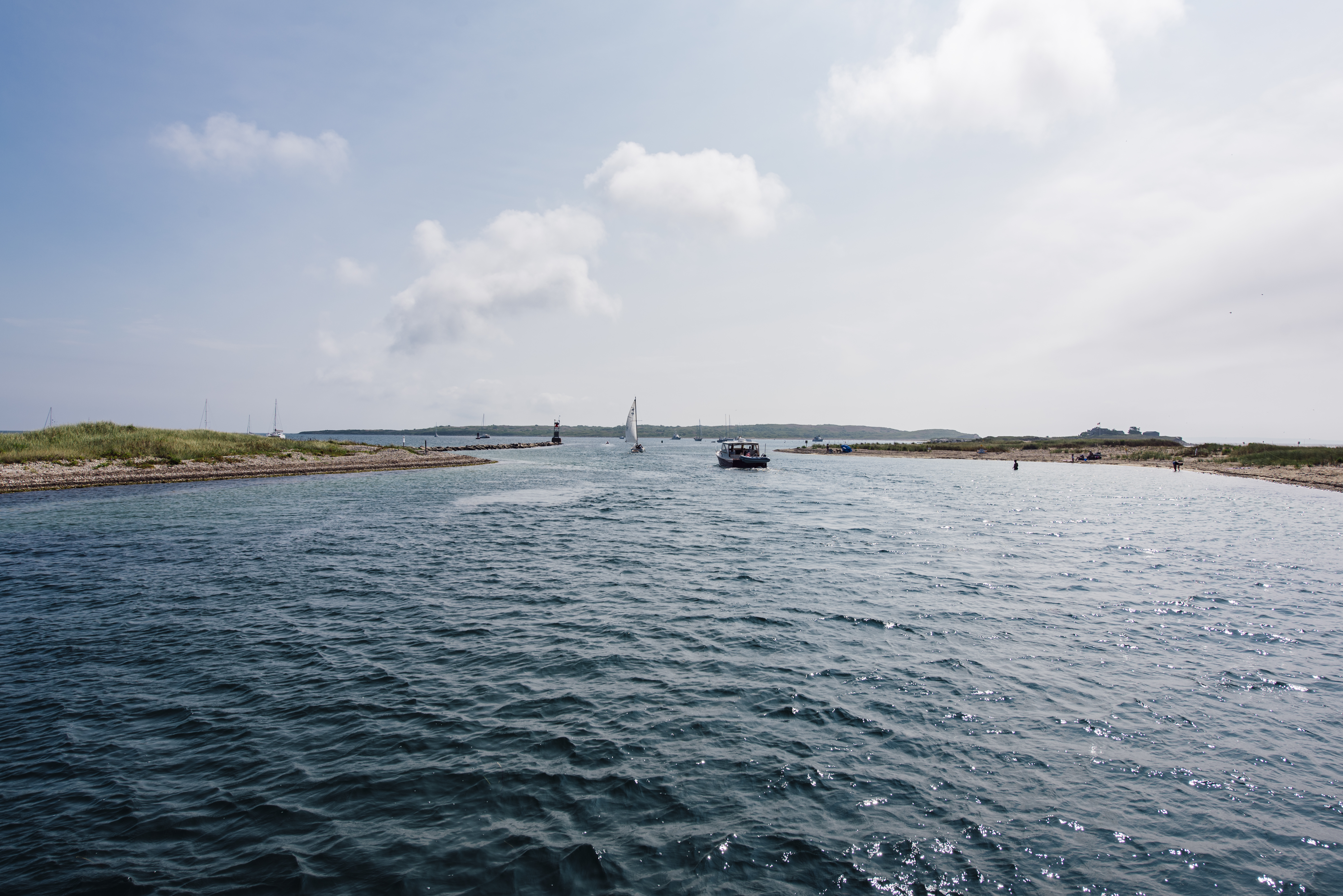
Entering Cuttyhunk Harbor

- Cuttyhunk Harbor is sheltered on its east by Nashawena Island on its west by Cuttyhunk Island and on its north by Penikese Island.
- Tarpaulin Cove is on the south shore of Naushon Island. The cove includes a public beach protected by the Naushon Island Trust.
- Hadley Harbor is located near Woods Hole and is made up of surrounding islands owned by the Naushon Trust. The only place visitors are allowed to land is Bull Island.

== Wildlife ==
There are many bluefish and striped bass found in the waters near all the islands. The stripers are drawn in by the rocky coastline of the islands. The abundance of different fish also brings in many different kinds of birds that can easily find pods of topwater fish.

- Stripers, or striped bass are popular gamefish in America. They are drawn to the underdeveloped coastlines and low levels of disturbance.
- Bluefish, which are fish that live along the east coast, are also found near the islands.
- Cattle are found on the islands of Nashawena and Naushon.
- Harbor Seals, Grey Seals, and Harp Seals are all found on the islands and in the waters between the islands. The seals can be seen on the sandbar called Gull Island at low tide.
- Deer are found on many of the islands because they swim over from the mainland. They are also known to swim to Martha's Vineyard when food is scarce.

== Recreation ==
=== Sightseeing ===
There are many different sights to see across the islands. Some of the most popular include Nashawena Island’s Highland Cattle, Tarpaulin Cove Lighthouse, Gay Head Cliffs, the Naval Lookout Point on Cuttyhunk, and a plethora of wildlife.

=== Bird watching ===
There are many birds found on Cuttyhunk who are the first birds migrating north in the spring and the last going south in the winter. This is because it is the last or first landmass in the bay. There are wildlife habitats located on Penikese Island that people visit to observe the birds.

=== Activities ===
On many of the public beaches and islands, it is popular to stop for a few hours and set up a picnic. People are also found snorkeling and swimming in the oceans around many of the islands.
