= Uncatena Island =

Island in Dukes County, Massachusetts, United States

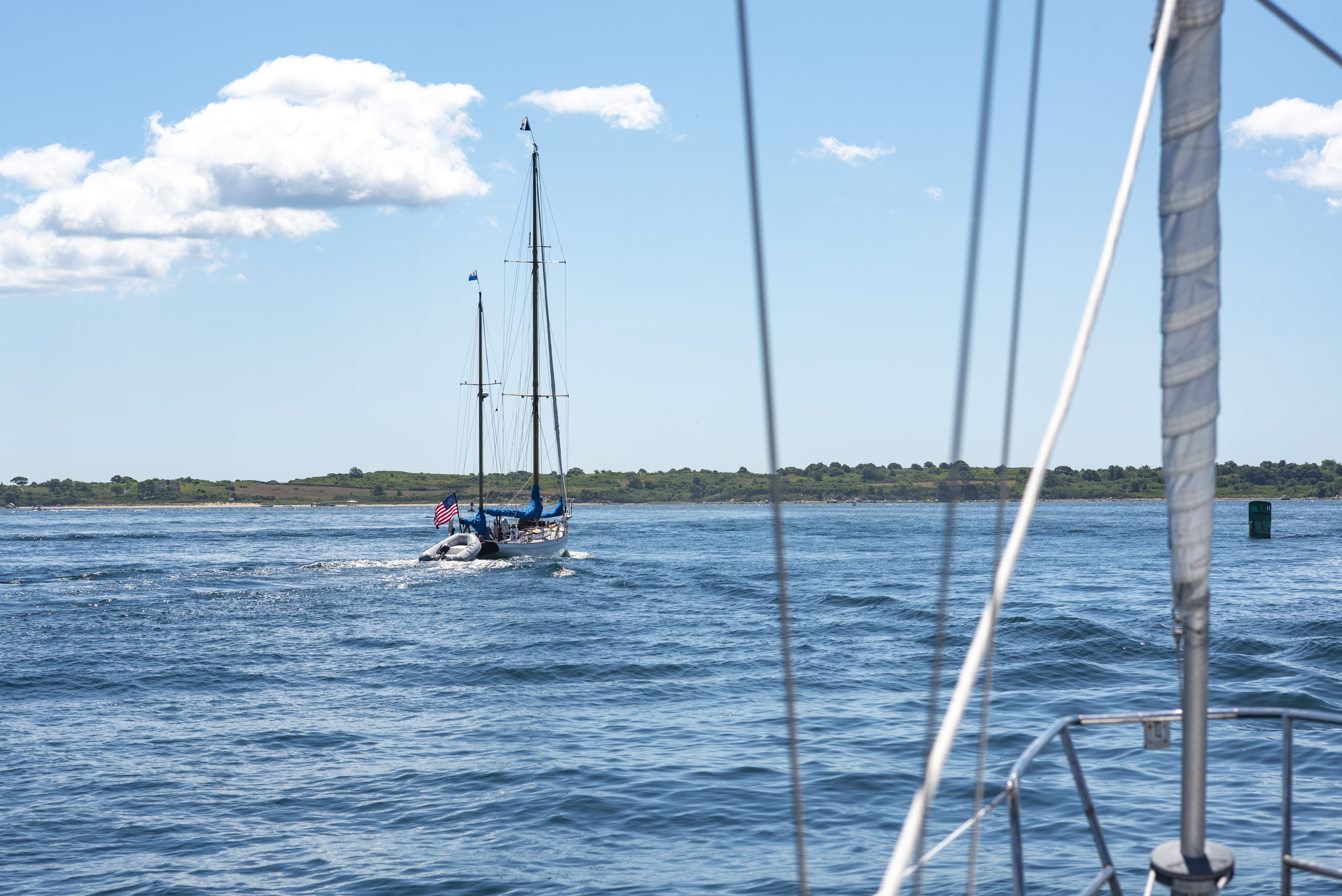
- Uncatena Island from Timmy Point Shoal

- Location within Massachusetts Location within the United States

Geography
- Location: Between Woods Hole and Naushon Island
- Coordinates: 41°31′04″N 70°42′20″W
- Archipelago: Elizabeth Islands
- Total islands: 1
- Area: .19 sq mi (0.49 km^{2})

Administration
- United States
- State: Massachusetts
- County: Dukes County
- Town: Gosnold

Demographics
- Population: 0 (2000)

Additional information
- Postal code: 02713
- Area code: 508 / 774

Uncatena Island is one of the Elizabeth Islands of Dukes County, Massachusetts, United States. It is the most northerly of the Elizabeth Islands and lies just off the northernmost point of Naushon Island. Uncatena has a land area of 0.492 km^{2} (0.19 sq mi, or 121.6 acres), and was uninhabited as of the 2000 census. It is part of the Town of Gosnold.
