= Nonamesset Island =

Island in Dukes County, Massachusetts, US

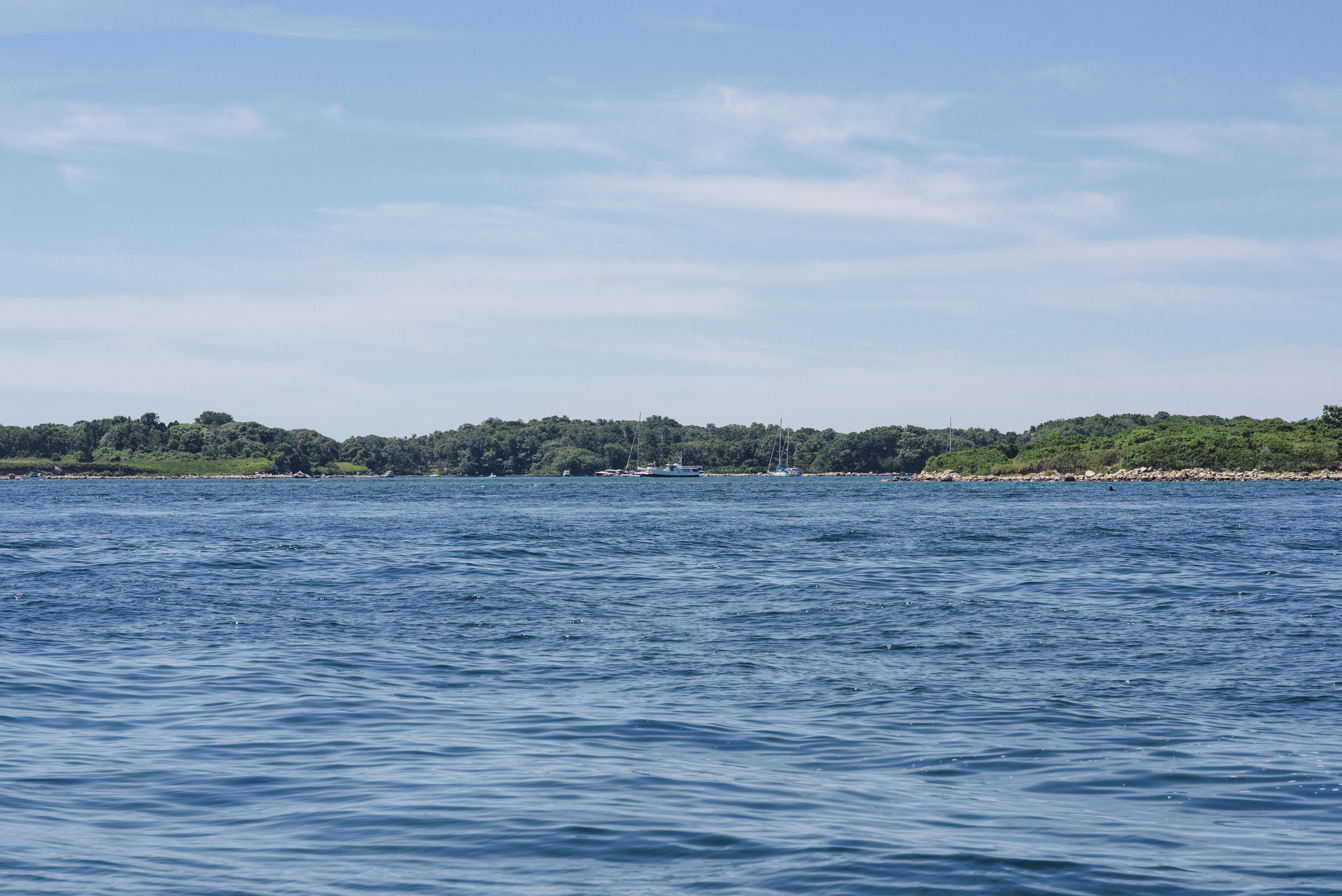
- Nonamesset Island with Hadley Harbor in foreground

- Location within Massachusetts Location within the United States

Geography
- Location: Between Woods Hole and Naushon Island
- Coordinates: 41°30′30″N 70°41′13″W
- Archipelago: Elizabeth Islands
- Total islands: 1
- Area: .54 sq mi (1.4 km^{2})
- Highest elevation: 52 ft (15.8 m)

Administration
- United States
- State: Massachusetts
- County: Dukes County
- Town: Gosnold

Demographics
- Population: 0 (2000)

Additional information
- Postal code: 02713
- Area code: 508 / 774

Nonamesset Island is the most easterly of the Elizabeth Islands of Dukes County, Massachusetts, United States. The island has a land area of 1.398 km^{2} (0.540 sq mi) or 345.5 acres) and was uninhabited as of the 2000 census. The island is part of the town of Gosnold, Massachusetts.

Painter Robert Swain Gifford was born on the island in 1840.
