= Dukes County, Massachusetts =

County in Massachusetts, United States

- County
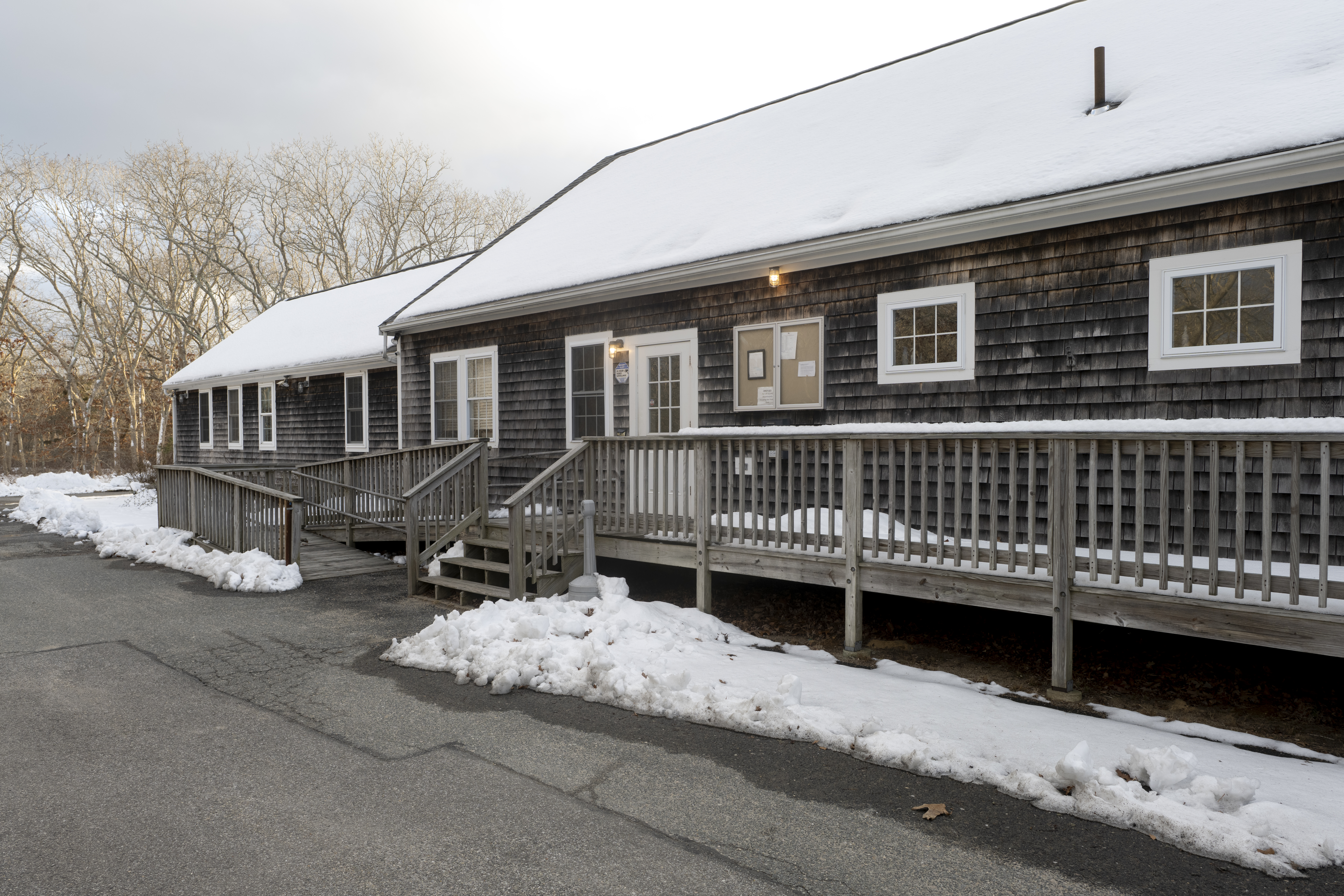
- County Administration Building at the Martha's Vineyard Airport

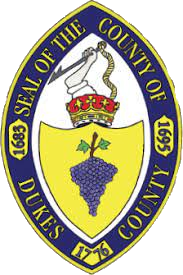
- Seal

- Location within the U.S. state of Massachusetts
- Coordinates: 41°24′53″N 70°36′46″W
- Country: United States
- State: Massachusetts
- Founded: 1695
- Named for: James, Duke of York
- Seat: Edgartown
- Largest town: Oak Bluffs

Area
  - Total: 491 sq mi (1,270 km^{2})
  - Land: 103 sq mi (270 km^{2})
  - Water: 388 sq mi (1,000 km^{2}) 79%

Population (2020)
  - Total: 20,600
  - Estimate (2025): 21,219 ▲
  - Density: 199.6/sq mi (77.1/km^{2})
- Time zone: UTC−5 (Eastern)
  - Summer (DST): UTC−4 (EDT)
- Congressional district: 9th
- Website: www.dukescounty.org

Dukes County is a county in the U.S. state of Massachusetts. At the 2020 census, the population was 20,600, making it the second-least populous county in Massachusetts. Its county seat is Edgartown.

Dukes County comprises the Vineyard Haven, MA Micropolitan Statistical Area. The county consists of about 40 named islands, the largest of which is Martha's Vineyard. It also includes Chappaquiddick Island (sometimes peninsula of the Vineyard), the Elizabeth Islands, including Cuttyhunk, and Nomans Land.

== History ==
An early seal of the Dukes County government, c. 1722, representing a crude portrayal of grapevines

The original inhabitants of the islands were Wampanoag, who had several villages. Political jurisdiction over the lands were granted by the English monarchy in overlapping claims to two different British nobles, from which Massachusetts Bay Company settler Thomas Mayhew purchased them in 1641. Mayhew established a colony in his new domain, carefully purchasing land ownership rights from the native inhabitants, and maintaining native governments to continue unimpeded. In 1665, Mayhew's lands were included in a grant to James, Duke of York (later King James II). In 1671, a settlement was arranged, allowing Mayhew to continue to rule while placing his territory under the jurisdiction of the Province of New York.

Dukes County was thus established as Dukes County, New York, on November 1, 1683, and included all of Mayhew's lands – Martha's Vineyard, Nantucket, and the Elizabeth Islands. The county was transferred to Massachusetts on October 7, 1691, and at the same time Nantucket Island was split into the separate Nantucket County, Massachusetts. The 1695 incorporation statute created a county "by the name of Dukes County," as opposed to the standard form "the county of Dukes" which is the reason for the redundancy in the formal name, "County of Dukes County".

== Geography ==
According to the U.S. Census Bureau, the county has a total area of 491 square miles (1,270 km^{2}), of which 103 square miles (270 km^{2}) is land and 388 square miles (1,000 km^{2}) (79%) is water. It is the third-smallest county by land area in Massachusetts.

=== Nearby counties ===
- Barnstable County – northeast
- Plymouth County – north
- Bristol County – northwest
- Nantucket County – east

=== National protected area ===
- Nomans Land Island National Wildlife Refuge

=== Named islands ===
Island Name	Land Area	Shoreline	Town	Location and Notes	Coordinates
Martha's Vineyard	95.5 mi^{2} (247 km^{2})	125.2 mi (201.5 km)		Area and shoreline includes Chappaquiddick	41°23′48.84″N 70°37′27.87″W
Naushon Island	7.38 mi^{2} (19.1 km^{2})	19.71 mi (31.72 km)	Gosnold		41°28′57.38″N 70°45′35.46″W
Chappaquiddick Island	5.61 mi^{2} (14.5 km^{2})	31.5 mi (50.7 km)	Edgartown	Periodic peninsula of Martha’s Vineyard	41°22′31.87″N 70°28′37.03″W
Nashawena Island	2.77 mi^{2} (7.2 km^{2})	9.58 mi (15.42 km)	Gosnold	Elizabeth Islands	41°25′48.41″N 70°52′30.74″W
Pasque Island	1.31 mi^{2} (3.4 km^{2})	6.02 mi (9.69 km)	Gosnold		41°27′3.46″N 70°49′34″W
Nomans Land	0.94 mi^{2} (2.4 km^{2})	4.46 mi (7.18 km)	Chilmark	Managed by United States Fish and Wildlife Service	41°15′21.14″N 70°48′51.98″W
Cuttyhunk Island	0.84 mi^{2} (2.2 km^{2})	10.47 mi (16.85 km)	Gosnold		41°25′14.35″N 70°55′59.62″W
Nonamesset Island	0.54 mi^{2} (1.4 km^{2})	4.62 mi (7.44 km)	Gosnold		41°30′36.08″N 70°41′14.98″W
Uncatena Island	0.19 mi^{2} (0.49 km^{2})	2.20 mi (3.54 km)	Gosnold		41°31′2.81″N 70°42′23.73″W
Penikese Island	0.13 mi^{2} (0.34 km^{2})	2.26 mi (3.64 km)	Gosnold		41°27′1.38″N 70°55′21.15″W
Goats Neck	23.30 acres (9.43 ha)	1.42 mi (2.29 km)	Gosnold	Connected to Naushon Island by land bridge	41°30′33.19″N 70°42′14″W
Veckatimest Island	15.27 acres (6.18 ha)	0.76 mi (1.22 km)	Gosnold		41°30′26.94″N 70°42′0.25″W
Great Island	9.02 acres (3.65 ha)	0.75 mi (1.21 km)	Chilmark	Squibnocket Pond; connected in the 1970s	41°18′55.73″N 70°46′13.93″W
Monohansett Island	8.08 acres (3.27 ha)	0.73 mi (1.17 km)	Gosnold		41°30′15.03″N 70°42′10.37″W
Weepecket Islands	7.8 acres (3.2 ha)	0.63 mi (1.01 km)	Gosnold	Three islands and one rock	41°30′43.6″N 70°44′23.54″W
Bull Island	7.63 acres (3.09 ha)	0.71 mi (1.14 km)	Gosnold		41°30′47.54″N 70°42′12.68″W
Buck Island	4.67 acres (1.89 ha)	0.4 mi (0.64 km)	Gosnold		41°30′22.2″N 70°42′11.45″W
Mayhew Island	4.64 acres (1.88 ha)	0.46 mi (0.74 km)	Chilmark	Nashaquitsa Pond	41°19′39.59″N 70°45′45.11″W
Beach Grass Island	3.69 acres (1.49 ha)	0.3 mi (0.48 km)	Chilmark	Squibnocket Pond	41°18′57.39″N 70°46′25.13″W
Wood Island	2.26 acres (0.91 ha)	0.25 mi (0.40 km)	Tisbury	Rhoda’s Pond	41°27′47.84″N 70°38′11.32″W
Edy’s Island	2.15 acres (0.87 ha)	0.28 mi (0.45 km)	Chilmark	Menemsha Pond	41°20′53.46″N 70°45′52.34″W
Sarson Island	1.78 acres (0.72 ha)	0.41 mi (0.66 km)	Oak Bluffs	Sengekontacket Pond	41°24′54.86″N 70°33′10.1″W
Bachelor Island	1.73 acres (0.70 ha)	0.52 mi (0.84 km)	Gosnold	Ephemeral sandbar off Naushon Island	41°30′2.16″N 70°42′27.28″W
Gull Island	1.56 acres (0.63 ha)	0.7 mi (1.1 km)	Gosnold		41°26′44.96″N 70°54′23.25″W
Allen’s Island	1.26 acres (0.51 ha)	0.19 mi (0.31 km)	Chilmark	Lower Chilmark Pond	41°21′0.37″N 70°41′43.75″W
Gravel Island	1.25 acres (0.51 ha)	0.2 mi (0.32 km)	Oak Bluffs	Sengekontacket Pond	41°25′39.9″N 70°33′48.78″W
Wood Island	1.09 acres (0.44 ha)	0.19 mi (0.31 km)	Oak Bluffs	Farm Pond	41°26′54.54″N 70°33′19.77″W
Baret Island	1.05 acres (0.42 ha)	0.22 mi (0.35 km)	Gosnold	Rocky islet off Nashawena Island	41°26′5.82″N 70°53′7.38″W
Gull Island	0.95 acres (0.38 ha)	0.21 mi (0.34 km)	Chilmark	Squibnocket Pond; connected in the 1980s	41°18′51.3″N 70°46′24.49″W
Gosnold Island	0.84 acres (0.34 ha)	0.15 mi (0.24 km)	Gosnold	West End Pond, Cuttyhunk	41°24′51.1″N 70°56′52.44″W
Cedar Island	0.81 acres (0.33 ha)	0.17 mi (0.27 km)	Gosnold		41°30′16.39″N 70°41′53.51″W
Haystack Island	0.77 acres (0.31 ha)	0.18 mi (0.29 km)	Edgartown	Sengekontacket Pond	41°24′25.78″N 70°32′47.91″W
Skiff’s Island	0.7 acres (0.28 ha)	0.14 mi (0.23 km)	Edgartown	Ephemeral sandbar off Wasque	41°20′16.43″N 70°26′58.77″W
Slates Island	0.56 acres (0.23 ha)	0.13 mi (0.21 km)	Gosnold	Cuttyhunk Pond	41°25′26.52″N 70°55′47.57″W
Ferry Boat Island	0.46 acres (0.19 ha)	0.15 mi (0.24 km)	Tisbury	Lagoon Pond; connected in 2019	41°27′5.31″N 70°35′53.2″W
Rock Island	0.27 acres (0.11 ha)	0.08 mi (0.13 km)	Gosnold	Rocky islet off Nashawena Island	41°26′1.59″N 70°53′12.71″W
Brush Island	0.25 acres (0.10 ha)	0.1 mi (0.16 km)	Oak Bluffs	Sengekontacket Pond	41°25′46.72″N 70°33′57.08″W
Pine Island	0.23 acres (0.093 ha)	0.17 mi (0.27 km)	Gosnold	Rocky islet off Nonamesset Island	41°31′1.38″N 70°40′51.36″W
Strawberry Island	0.2 acres (0.081 ha)	0.1 mi (0.16 km)	Chilmark	Squibnocket Pond	41°19′17.11″N 70°46′54.17″W
Viking Ring	0.04 acres (0.016 ha)	0.05 mi (0.080 km)	Chilmark	Rocky islet in Round Pond	41°18′28.62″N 70°46′48.02″W

=== Climate ===
The climate of Dukes County is now humid subtropical (Cfa.)

Climate data for Martha's Vineyard (Edgartown, Massachusetts) 1991–2020 normals, extremes 1946–present
Month	Jan	Feb	Mar	Apr	May	Jun	Jul	Aug	Sep	Oct	Nov	Dec	Year
Record high °F (°C)	65 (18)	64 (18)	75 (24)	90 (32)	91 (33)	95 (35)	95 (35)	99 (37)	92 (33)	88 (31)	74 (23)	67 (19)	99 (37)
Mean maximum °F (°C)	55.1 (12.8)	54.9 (12.7)	60.6 (15.9)	70.2 (21.2)	80.5 (26.9)	86.1 (30.1)	89.7 (32.1)	87.6 (30.9)	83.6 (28.7)	75.7 (24.3)	67.1 (19.5)	59.1 (15.1)	91.0 (32.8)
Mean daily maximum °F (°C)	40.1 (4.5)	41.5 (5.3)	46.4 (8.0)	55.4 (13.0)	64.9 (18.3)	73.8 (23.2)	80.4 (26.9)	79.9 (26.6)	74.0 (23.3)	64.0 (17.8)	54.4 (12.4)	45.5 (7.5)	60.0 (15.6)
Daily mean °F (°C)	32.9 (0.5)	34.1 (1.2)	39.0 (3.9)	47.5 (8.6)	56.7 (13.7)	65.7 (18.7)	72.3 (22.4)	71.9 (22.2)	66.2 (19.0)	56.1 (13.4)	47.0 (8.3)	38.4 (3.6)	52.3 (11.3)
Mean daily minimum °F (°C)	25.6 (−3.6)	26.8 (−2.9)	31.7 (−0.2)	39.5 (4.2)	48.6 (9.2)	57.6 (14.2)	64.2 (17.9)	63.9 (17.7)	58.4 (14.7)	48.2 (9.0)	39.7 (4.3)	31.3 (−0.4)	44.6 (7.0)
Mean minimum °F (°C)	6.8 (−14.0)	10.1 (−12.2)	16.3 (−8.7)	27.5 (−2.5)	35.1 (1.7)	45.8 (7.7)	53.7 (12.1)	53.0 (11.7)	44.0 (6.7)	32.8 (0.4)	22.7 (−5.2)	15.1 (−9.4)	5.1 (−14.9)
Record low °F (°C)	−6 (−21)	−9 (−23)	−7 (−22)	12 (−11)	28 (−2)	37 (3)	45 (7)	41 (5)	32 (0)	22 (−6)	14 (−10)	−5 (−21)	−9 (−23)
Average precipitation inches (mm)	4.10 (104)	3.57 (91)	4.80 (122)	4.18 (106)	3.74 (95)	3.39 (86)	2.64 (67)	3.72 (94)	3.89 (99)	4.63 (118)	4.21 (107)	4.84 (123)	47.71 (1,212)
Average snowfall inches (cm)	8.8 (22)	8.1 (21)	4.7 (12)	0.3 (0.76)	0.0 (0.0)	0.0 (0.0)	0.0 (0.0)	0.0 (0.0)	0.0 (0.0)	0.0 (0.0)	0.0 (0.0)	3.4 (8.6)	25.3 (64)
Average precipitation days (≥ 0.01 in)	11.9	9.8	11.4	11.9	12.0	10.2	7.8	8.9	9.3	11.2	11.4	12.1	127.9
Average snowy days (≥ 0.1 in)	3.5	3.3	2.0	0.2	0.0	0.0	0.0	0.0	0.0	0.0	0.1	1.4	10.5
Source: NOAA

== Demographics ==
Historical population
Census	Pop.	Note	%±
1790	3,255		—
1800	3,118		−4.2%
1810	3,290		5.5%
1820	3,292		0.1%
1830	3,517		6.8%
1840	3,958		12.5%
1850	4,540		14.7%
1860	4,403		−3.0%
1870	3,787		−14.0%
1880	4,300		13.5%
1890	4,369		1.6%
1900	4,561		4.4%
1910	4,504		−1.2%
1920	4,372		−2.9%
1930	4,953		13.3%
1940	5,669		14.5%
1950	5,633		−0.6%
1960	5,829		3.5%
1970	6,117		4.9%
1980	8,942		46.2%
1990	11,639		30.2%
2000	14,987		28.8%
2010	16,535		10.3%
2020	20,600		24.6%
2025 (est.)	21,219	▲	3.0%
U.S. Decennial Census; 1790–1960 1900–1990; 1990–2000 2010 2020

=== 2020 census ===
As of the 2020 census, the county had a population of 20,600. Of the residents, 16.1% were under the age of 18 and 27.0% were 65 years of age or older; the median age was 49.3 years. For every 100 females there were 95.7 males, and for every 100 females age 18 and over there were 93.9 males. 68.3% of residents lived in urban areas and 31.7% lived in rural areas.

The racial makeup of the county was 78.8% White, 3.9% Black or African American, 1.0% American Indian and Alaska Native, 0.9% Asian, 0.04% Native Hawaiian and Pacific Islander, 3.4% from some other race, and 9.4% from two or more races. Hispanic or Latino residents of any race comprised 2.6% of the population.

There were 8,932 households in the county, of which 24.1% had children under the age of 18 living with them and 28.3% had a female householder with no spouse or partner present. About 31.5% of all households were made up of individuals and 17.1% had someone living alone who was 65 years of age or older.

There were 17,530 housing units, of which 49.0% were vacant. Among occupied housing units, 71.2% were owner-occupied and 28.8% were renter-occupied. The homeowner vacancy rate was 1.0% and the rental vacancy rate was 9.5%.

=== Racial and ethnic composition ===
Dukes County, Massachusetts – Racial and ethnic composition Note: the US Census treats Hispanic/Latino as an ethnic category. This table excludes Latinos from the racial categories and assigns them to a separate category. Hispanics/Latinos may be of any race.
Race / Ethnicity (NH = Non-Hispanic)	Pop 1980	Pop 1990	Pop 2000	Pop 2010	Pop 2020	% 1980	% 1990	% 2000	% 2010	% 2020
White alone (NH)	8,339	10,896	13,489	14,275	16,230	93.26%	93.62%	90.00%	86.33%	78.79%
Black or African American alone (NH)	293	323	346	477	795	3.28%	2.78%	2.31%	2.88%	3.86%
Native American or Alaska Native alone (NH)	154	238	253	175	202	1.72%	2.04%	1.69%	1.06%	0.98%
Asian alone (NH)	16	39	66	123	184	0.18%	0.34%	0.44%	0.74%	0.89%
Native Hawaiian or Pacific Islander alone (NH)	x	x	10	4	9	x	x	0.07%	0.02%	0.04%
Other race alone (NH)	62	22	203	571	701	0.69%	0.19%	1.35%	3.45%	3.40%
Mixed race or Multiracial (NH)	x	x	465	526	1,945	x	x	3.10%	3.18%	9.44%
Hispanic or Latino (any race)	78	121	155	384	534	0.87%	1.04%	1.03%	2.32%	2.59%
Total	8,942	11,639	14,987	16,535	20,600	100.00%	100.00%	100.00%	100.00%	100.00%

=== 2010 census ===
At the 2010 census, there were 16,535 people, 7,368 households, and 4,221 families living in the county. The population density was 160.2 inhabitants per square mile (61.9/km^{2}). There were 17,188 housing units at an average density of 166.5 per square mile (64.3/km^{2}). The racial makeup of the county was 87.6% white, 3.1% black or African American, 1.1% American Indian, 0.8% Asian, 0.1% Pacific islander, 3.9% from other races, and 3.4% from two or more races. Those of Hispanic or Latino origin made up 2.3% of the population.

The largest ancestry groups were:

- 18.5% Irish
- 17.1% English
- 11.7% Portuguese
- 10.0% American
- 9.2% German
- 7.6% Italian
- 5.5% French
- 2.9% West Indian
- 2.9% Scottish
- 2.5% Dutch
- 2.3% Scotch-Irish
- 2.1% Swedish
- 2.1% Polish
- 1.9% French Canadian
- 1.4% Russian
- 1.1% Arab
- 1.0% Sub-Saharan African

Of the 7,368 households, 25.9% had children under the age of 18 living with them, 44.1% were married couples living together, 8.9% had a female householder with no husband present, 42.7% were non-families, and 33.4% of households were made up of individuals. The average household size was 2.22 and the average family size was 2.81. The median age was 45.3 years.

The median household income was $62,407 and the median family income was $77,231. Males had a median income of $43,850 versus $41,994 for females. The per capita income for the county was $33,390. About 5.5% of families and 8.6% of the population were below the poverty line, including 4.3% of those under age 18 and 7.2% of those age 65 or over.

=== 2000 census ===
At the 2000 census there were 14,987 people, 6,421 households, and 3,788 families living in the county. The population density was 144 inhabitants per square mile (56/km^{2}). There were 14,836 housing units at an average density of 143 per square mile (55/km^{2}). The racial makeup of the county was 90.69% White, 2.40% Black or African American, 1.71% Native American, 0.46% Asian, 0.07% Pacific Islander, 1.48% from other races, and 3.19% from two or more races. 1.03% of the population were Hispanic or Latino of any race. 20.4% were of English, 13.3% Irish, 8.6% Portuguese, 6.4% Italian and 5.7% American ancestry, 93.1% spoke English, 3.7% Portuguese and 1.7% Spanish as their first language and 0.285% speak Irish at home. Of the 6,421 households 28.40% had children under the age of 18 living with them, 45.40% were married couples living together, 9.80% had a female householder with no husband present, and 41.00% were non-families. 32.00% of households were one person and 11.10% were one person aged 65 or older. The average household size was 2.30 and the average family size was 2.91.

The age distribution was 22.70% under the age of 18, 5.50% from 18 to 24, 29.60% from 25 to 44, 27.80% from 45 to 64, and 14.40% 65 or older. The median age was 41 years. For every 100 females, there were 95.60 males. For every 100 females age 18 and over, there were 92.10 males.

The median household income was $45,559 and the median family income was $55,018. Males had a median income of $38,945 versus $30,346 for females. The per capita income for the county was $26,472. About 5.00% of families and 7.30% of the population were below the poverty line, including 10.40% of those under age 18 and 5.30% of those age 65 or over.

=== Real estate ===
As of the fourth quarter 2021, the median value of homes in Dukes County was $883,820, an increase of 22.3% from the prior year.

=== Demographic breakdown by town ===
==== Income ====
The ranking of unincorporated communities that are included on the list are reflective if the census designated locations and villages were included as cities or towns. Data is from the 2007–2011 American Community Survey 5-Year Estimates.

Rank	Town		Per capita income	Median household income	Median family income	Population	Number of households
1	Chilmark	Town	$45,210	$59,583	$79,688	801	302
2	Edgartown	Town	$38,083	$74,214	$82,583	4,034	1,466
3	West Tisbury	Town	$36,592	$75,759	$87,566	2,506	926
	Massachusetts	State	$35,051	$65,981	$83,371	6,512,227	2,522,409
	Dukes County	County	$33,228	$69,760	$82,659	16,353	5,568
	Vineyard Haven	CDP	$30,298	$77,935	$92,112	2,465	652
4	Gosnold	Town	$29,511	$52,813	$61,250	183	63
5	Tisbury	Town	$29,384	$54,762	$60,521	3,914	1,290
6	Oak Bluffs	Town	$29,117	$78,890	$84,846	4,449	1,429
	United States	Country	$27,915	$52,762	$64,293	306,603,772	114,761,359
7	Aquinnah	Town	$25,512	$82,500	$106,250	466	92

=== Religion ===
Year	1980		1990		2000		2010	
Religion	Congregations	Adherents	Congregations	Adherents	Congregations	Adherents	Congregations	Adherents
Catholic Church	3	2,000	3	5,000	3	9,951	3	12,896
Episcopal Church	2	871	3	562	3	608	3	473
United Methodist	6	620	6	587	5	524	2	176
American Baptist	3	279	3	403	3	461	4	456
Regular Baptist	0	n/a	1	62	1	83	1	90
United Church of Christ	1	110	1	166	1	217	1	165
Unitarian-Universalist	1	83	1	83	1	83	1	74
Assemblies of God	1	5	1	69	2	174	1	160
Friends (Quakers)	1	n/a	1	22	1	52	1	9
Church of Christ, Scientist	n/a	n/a	1	n/a	1	n/a	1	n/a
Congregational	n/a	n/a	1	300	1	295	1	331
Jehovah's Witnesses	n/a	n/a	n/a	n/a	n/a	n/a	1	n/a
Evangelical Christian	0	n/a	0	n/a	0	n/a	1	60
Mormon	n/a	n/a	1	27	1	49	1	84
Buddhist	0	n/a	0	n/a	0	n/a	1	72
Jewish	1	138	1	260	1	300	1	923
Ba'hai	0	0	0	0	0	5	0	4
Unaffiliated	0	n/a	0	n/a	0	n/a	0	10,562

== Politics ==
United States presidential election results for Dukes County, Massachusetts
Year	Republican		Democratic		Third party(ies)	
Year	No.	%	No.	%	No.	%
1868	436	80.15%	108	19.85%	0	0.00%
1872	556	82.74%	116	17.26%	0	0.00%
1876	399	72.81%	149	27.19%	0	0.00%
1880	576	76.60%	174	23.14%	2	0.27%
1884	568	67.70%	202	24.08%	69	8.22%
1888	570	64.19%	199	22.41%	119	13.40%
1892	588	66.52%	238	26.92%	58	6.56%
1896	691	80.54%	91	10.61%	76	8.86%
1900	617	79.10%	114	14.62%	49	6.28%
1904	602	80.16%	120	15.98%	29	3.86%
1908	589	76.79%	133	17.34%	45	5.87%
1912	269	34.75%	215	27.78%	290	37.47%
1916	464	58.96%	309	39.26%	14	1.78%
1920	1,013	86.73%	150	12.84%	5	0.43%
1924	1,182	86.91%	108	7.94%	70	5.15%
1928	1,487	75.94%	470	24.00%	1	0.05%
1932	1,330	68.80%	583	30.16%	20	1.03%
1936	1,655	63.29%	931	35.60%	29	1.11%
1940	1,643	61.54%	1,014	37.98%	13	0.49%
1944	1,372	61.41%	861	38.54%	1	0.04%
1948	1,731	69.69%	720	28.99%	33	1.33%
1952	2,432	76.05%	760	23.76%	6	0.19%
1956	2,618	82.85%	541	17.12%	1	0.03%
1960	1,998	60.80%	1,282	39.01%	6	0.18%
1964	1,015	31.58%	2,187	68.05%	12	0.37%
1968	1,576	49.31%	1,540	48.19%	80	2.50%
1972	2,312	53.32%	2,001	46.15%	23	0.53%
1976	2,365	46.06%	2,513	48.94%	257	5.00%
1980	1,809	33.52%	2,370	43.91%	1,218	22.57%
1984	2,788	45.52%	3,313	54.09%	24	0.39%
1988	2,441	34.75%	4,495	63.99%	89	1.27%
1992	1,827	23.16%	4,292	54.41%	1,769	22.43%
1996	1,739	22.58%	5,137	66.70%	826	10.72%
2000	2,315	26.14%	5,474	61.81%	1,067	12.05%
2004	2,602	26.03%	7,265	72.67%	130	1.30%
2008	2,442	23.14%	7,913	74.98%	198	1.88%
2012	2,792	25.46%	7,978	72.74%	198	1.81%
2016	2,477	21.22%	8,400	71.95%	797	6.83%
2020	2,631	20.56%	9,914	77.47%	253	1.98%
2024	2,745	22.48%	9,137	74.84%	327	2.68%

Similar to much of the state of Massachusetts, Dukes County heavily supports the Democratic Party. The last Republican Party candidate to receive over 40% of the county's vote was Ronald Reagan in 1984, and the last Republican to win the county was Richard Nixon in 1972. Before 1964, however, the county was a stronghold of the Republicans, supporting Dwight D. Eisenhower in 1956 by an especially large margin, well over 50%, and was one of the few counties where William Howard Taft finished ahead of Woodrow Wilson in 1912. (See table).

=== Voter registration ===
Voter registration and party enrollment as of February 2024
Unenrolled	9,710	58.16%
Democratic	5,762	34.51%
Republican	1,117	6.69%
Libertarian	42	0.25%
Other parties	65	0.39%
Total	16,696	100%

== Communities ==
=== Towns ===
- Aquinnah (formerly Gay Head)
- Chilmark
- Edgartown (shire town or county seat)
- Gosnold
- Oak Bluffs
- Tisbury
- West Tisbury

=== Census-designated places ===
- Edgartown
- Oak Bluffs
- Vineyard Haven

=== Other villages ===
- Cuttyhunk
- Menemsha

== Education ==
School districts include:

K-12:

- Gosnold School District

Secondary:

- Martha's Vineyard School District

Elementary:

- Edgartown School District
- Oak Bluffs School District
- Tisbury School District
- Up-Island Regional School District

== See also ==
- List of Massachusetts locations by per capita income
- Registry of Deeds (Massachusetts)
- National Register of Historic Places listings in Dukes County, Massachusetts
- USS Dukes County (LST-735)
