= Gosnold, Massachusetts =

- Town
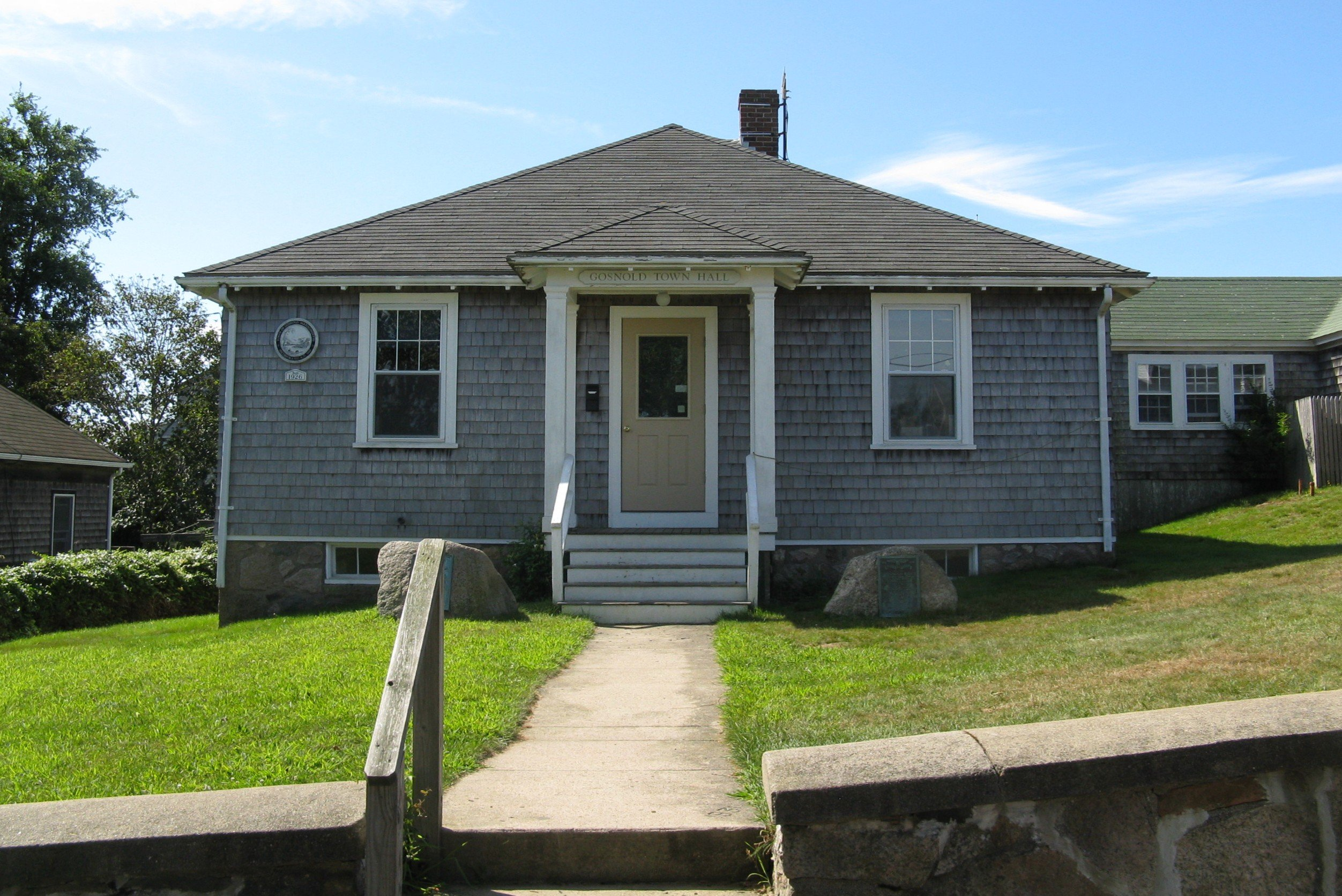
- Gosnold Town Hall in the village of Cuttyhunk

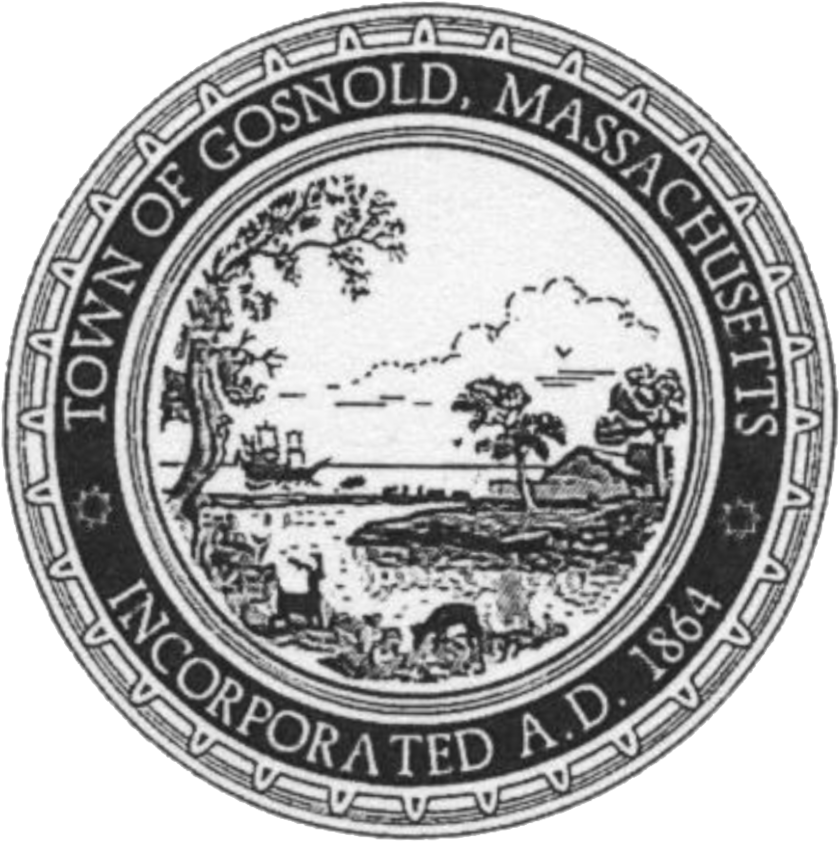
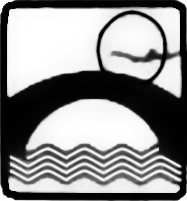
- Flag Seal Logo

- Location in Dukes County in Massachusetts
- Coordinates: 41°28′54″N 70°45′25″W
- Country: United States
- State: Massachusetts
- County: Dukes
- Settled: 1641
- Incorporated: March 17, 1864

Government
  - Type: Open town meeting
  - Town Administrator: Paul Bockelman

Area
  - Total: 140.2 sq mi (363.0 km^{2})
  - Land: 13.2 sq mi (34.2 km^{2})
  - Water: 127.0 sq mi (328.9 km^{2})
- Elevation: 85 ft (26 m)

Population (2020)
  - Total: 70
  - Density: 5.2/sq mi (2/km^{2})
- Time zone: UTC-5 (Eastern)
  - Summer (DST): UTC-4 (Eastern)
- ZIP Codes: 02713 (Cuttyhunk); 02543 (Woods Hole)
- Area code: 508 / 774
- FIPS code: 25-26325
- GNIS feature ID: 0618290
- Website: www.townofgosnold.org

Gosnold is a town in Dukes County, Massachusetts, United States. At the 2020 census, the town population was 70, making it the least populous town in Massachusetts. Gosnold encompasses the Elizabeth Islands and most residents live in the island-village of Cuttyhunk. Most of Gosnold is privately owned by the Forbes family, except for the islands of Cuttyhunk and Penikese.

== History ==
The earliest inhabitants of the Elizabeth Islands were the Wampanoag Native Americans. The tribe did not settle permanently on the Elizabeth Islands, but used them in summer for hunting, fishing, and gardening. Occasionally, arrowheads or stone tools are discovered on the islands. The islands' names come from the Wampanoag language.

Bartholomew Gosnold was among the first Europeans to become aware of the Elizabeth Islands, including Cuttyhunk, in 1602. He and his crew attempted to establish a trading post on Cuttyhunk so that they could trade with the natives, the first attempt by Europeans to do so. The trading post was abandoned after only a few weeks, and Gosnold decided to return home. Upon his return to England, the British Crown claimed jurisdiction of the island chain.

Gosnold was first settled in 1641, the year of purchase of the islands by Thomas Mayhew, Sr. The islands were claimed by the Wampanoag until 1658, when the Wampanoag sachem transferred the deed of ownership to Mayhew. Constituting Dukes County, New York since 1683, the Elizabeth Islands, Martha's Vineyard, and Nantucket, were transferred to the newly created Province of Massachusetts Bay in 1691. Gosnold was separately incorporated as a municipality in 1864; previously it was a part of the town of Chilmark.

== Geography ==
According to the United States Census Bureau, the town has a total area of 140.2 square miles (363.0 km^{2}), of which 13.2 square miles (34.2 km^{2}) is land and 127.0 square miles (328.9 km^{2}), or 90.59%, is water. Gosnold ranks 272nd out of the 351 communities in the Commonwealth in terms of land area; however, it has the longest distance between points within municipal limits of any town in the Commonwealth of Massachusetts. It consists of the Elizabeth Islands, including Nonamesset Island, Uncatena Island, Naushon Island, Pasque Island, Nashawena Island, Penikese Island, Cuttyhunk Island, and several smaller islands. The string of islands extend roughly southwest of the southwestern tip of Falmouth, with the closest island, Nonamesset, being less than one-third of a mile away at its closest point. More than half the population lives on Cuttyhunk, with the majority of the rest living on Naushon.

== Transportation ==
Transportation to the island of Cuttyhunk is served by Cuttyhunk Ferry Company from New Bedford. Service is daily in the warm months, and on Monday and Friday in the cooler months. There is also a water taxi service between New Bedford and Cuttyhunk.

Naushon Island is served by a private ferry from Woods Hole. The islands of Nonamesset and Uncatena are connected to Naushon Island via bridges that can be crossed by foot.

Penikese Island is accessible via a chartered boat for STEM-related school trips.

All other remaining islands in the town of Gosnold do not have regular / publicized boat service and require a private vessel to be reached.

== Demographics ==
Historical population
Year	Pop.	±%
1870	99	—
1880	152	+53.5%
1890	135	−11.2%
1900	164	+21.5%
1910	152	−7.3%
1920	181	+19.1%
1930	120	−33.7%
1940	136	+13.3%
1950	56	−58.8%
1960	66	+17.9%
1970	83	+25.8%
1980	63	−24.1%
1990	98	+55.6%
2000	86	−12.2%
2010	75	−12.8%
2020	70	−6.7%
2024*	62	−11.4%
* = population estimate. Source: United States Census records and Population Estimates Program data.

As of the census of 2020, there were 70 people and 26 households residing in the town. The population density was 5.3 inhabitants per square mile (2.0/km^{2}). There were 218 housing units at an average density of 16.5 per square mile (6.4/km^{2}). The racial makeup of the town was 61 (87.14%) White, 3 (4.29%) Hispanic or Latino, 3 (4.29%) African Americans, Native Americans, and 5 (7.14%) from two or more races. The census did not report any Asians, or Pacific Islanders, and reported one person as Some Other Race.

In the town, the population was made up entirely of adults, of which 36.7% were 65 years of age or older.

According to the 2010 Census, Gosnold now has the lowest population density of any town in the Commonwealth. The title was previously held by Mount Washington at the southwest corner of Massachusetts.

Gosnold was first in a 2008 ranking of all Massachusetts communities in terms of total value of real estate per resident.

== Government and politics ==
=== Government ===
On the national level, Gosnold is a part of Massachusetts's 9th congressional district, and is currently represented by Democrat Bill Keating. Massachusetts is currently represented in the United States Senate by senior Senator (Democrat) Elizabeth Warren and junior Senator (Democrat) Ed Markey.

On the state level, Gosnold is represented in the Massachusetts House of Representatives as a part of the Barnstable, Dukes and Nantucket district, which includes all of Martha's Vineyard and Nantucket, as well as a portion of Falmouth. The town is represented in the Massachusetts Senate as a portion of the Cape and Islands district, which includes all of Martha's Vineyard, Nantucket and most of Barnstable County (with the exception of Bourne, Sandwich, and Falmouth). All of Dukes County is patrolled by the Fifth (Oak Bluffs) Barracks of Troop D of the Massachusetts State Police.

Gosnold is governed on the local level by the open town meeting form of government, and is led by a board of selectmen. Due to its geographic isolation and small population, the town has at times asked for a waiver from the Commonwealth from anti-nepotism laws.

Gosnold is a dry town; alcoholic beverages may not be sold or served.

=== Political affiliation ===
Registered voters and party enrollment as of October 29, 2022
Party	Number of Voters	Percentage
Unenrolled	64	64%
Democratic	20	20%
Republican	15	15%
Total	100	100%

=== Politics ===
Presidential election results

Presidential Elections Results
Year	Democratic	Republican	Third Parties
2024	76.1% 51	22.4% 15	1.5% 1
2020	68.3% 56	26.8% 22	4.9% 4
2016	50.7% 36	38.0% 27	7.4% 5
2012	56.3% 49	41.4% 36	2.3% 2
2008	65.0% 52	32.5% 26	2.5% 2
2004	53.3% 41	44.2% 34	2.6% 2
2000	48.2% 39	40.7% 33	11.1% 9
1996	50.6% 46	23.1% 21	13.2% 12
1992	40.4% 42	28.9% 30	30.8% 32
1988	48.5% 50	50.5% 52	1.0% 1
1984	29.1% 23	70.9% 56	2.2% 0
1980	23.7% 18	46.1% 35	30.1% 23
1976	23.0% 17	68.9% 51	5.4% 4
1972	16.4% 10	77.1% 47	2.2% 0
1968	31.4% 16	66.7% 34	1.9% 1
1964	54.8% 23	45.2% 19	2.2% 0
1960	21.7% 10	78.3% 36	2.2% 0
1956	8.8% 6	91.2% 62	0.0% 0
1952	14.7% 9	85.3% 52	0.0% 0
1948	31.0% 13	69.0% 29	0.0% 0
1944	37.8% 14	62.2% 23	0.0% 0
1940	34.9% 15	65.1% 28	0.0% 0
1936	28.8% 15	71.2% 37	0.0% 0
1932	43.8% 21	56.2% 27	0.0% 0
1928	20.0% 11	80.0% 44	0.0% 0
1924	4.1% 2	95.9% 47	0.0% 0
1920	22.2% 10	77.8% 35	0.0% 0
1916	15.2% 5	84.8% 23	0.0% 0
1912	12.1% 4	51.5% 17	36.4% 12
1908	10.3% 3	86.2% 25	3.5% 1
1904	12.5% 2	81.3% 13	6.2% 1
1900	13.0% 3	82.6% 19	4.4% 1
1896	0.0% 0	100.0% 17	0.0% 0
1892	31.0% 9	65.5% 19	3.5% 1
1888	35.0% 7	65.0% 13	0.0% 0
1884	42.9% 9	57.1% 12	0.0% 0
1880	0.0% 0	100.0% 19	0.0% 0
1876	0.0% 0	100.0% 15	0.0% 0
1872	0.0% 0	100.0% 14	0.0% 0
1868	0.0% 0	100.0% 18	0.0% 0

Gubernatorial election results

Gubernatorial Elections Results
Year	Democratic	Republican	Third Parties
2022	73.6% 39	24.5% 13	1.9% 1
2018	23.2% 13	76.8% 43	0.0% 0
2014	43.5% 20	52.2% 24	2.2% 1
2010	41.2% 28	50.0% 34	8.8% 6
2006	52.5% 31	44.1% 26	3.4% 2
2002	40.0% 20	54.0% 27	6.0% 3
1998	38.5% 25	50.8% 33	4.6% 3
1994	23.9% 17	73.2% 52	2.8% 2
1990	39.3% 33	56.0% 47	3.6% 3
1986	71.2% 42	27.1% 16	0.0% 0
1982	44.3% 27	49.2% 30	6.6% 4
1978	33.3% 16	64.6% 31	2.1% 1
1974	31.9% 15	63.8% 30	2.1% 1
1970	11.1% 5	86.7% 39	0.0% 0

== Education ==
The town has one schoolhouse, Cuttyhunk Elementary School. As of 2020, the school has no students. However, the town hopes to use the school as a STEM resource center for mainland schools to visit.

Penikese Island is home to The Penikese School. It operated as a private school for troubled boys until 2011. The school then became a substance abuse treatment center for a short time before converting into an educational facility for field trips.
