= Woods Hole, Massachusetts =

- Census-designated place
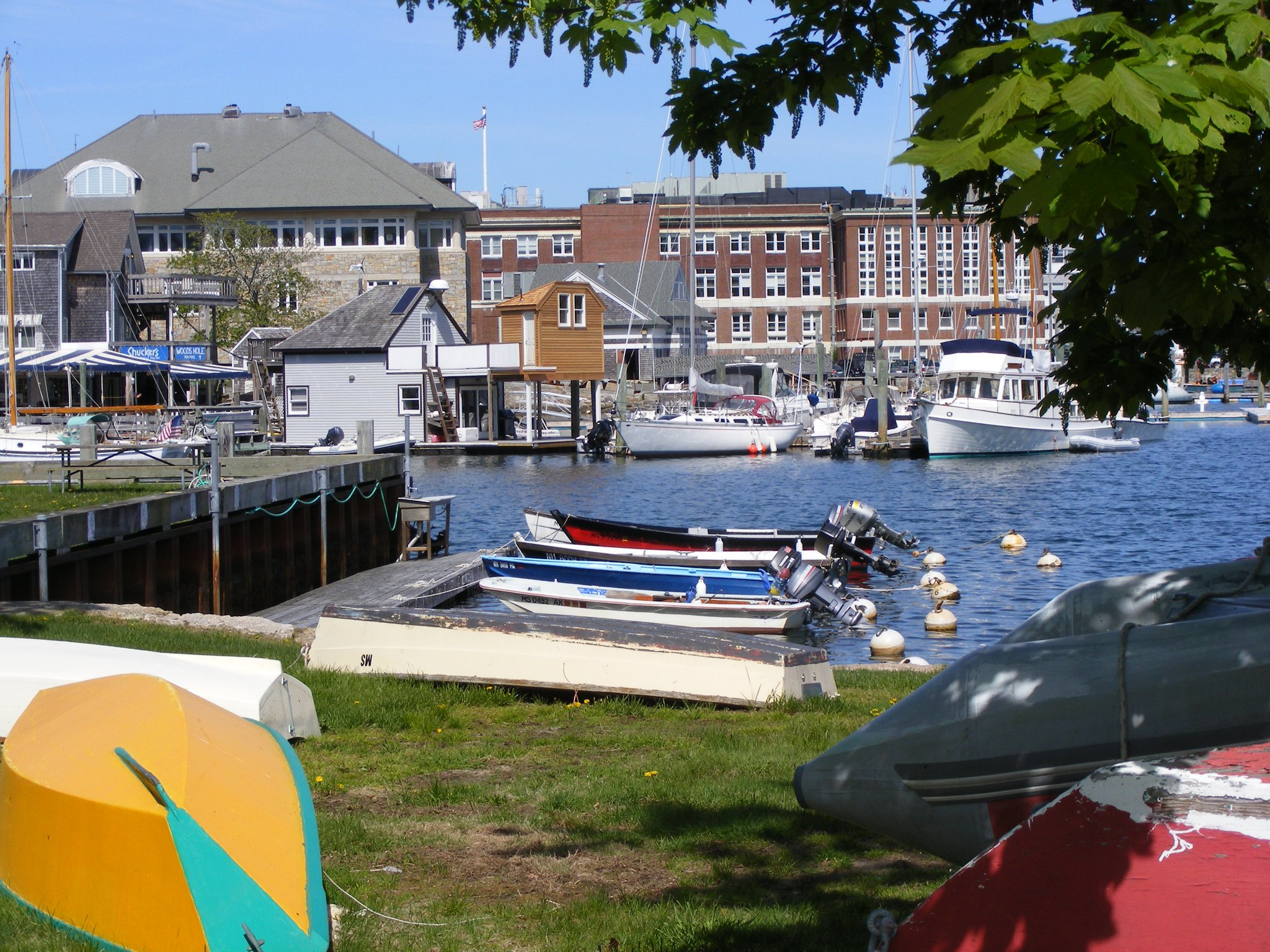

- Location in Barnstable County and the state of Massachusetts.
- Coordinates: 41°31′36″N 70°39′47″W
- Country: United States
- State: Massachusetts
- County: Barnstable
- Town: Falmouth

Area
  - Total: 3.93 sq mi (10.19 km^{2})
  - Land: 2.14 sq mi (5.53 km^{2})
  - Water: 1.80 sq mi (4.66 km^{2})
- Elevation: 20 ft (6 m)

Population (2020)
  - Total: 834
  - Density: 390.5/sq mi (150.79/km^{2})
- Time zone: UTC-5 (Eastern (EST))
  - Summer (DST): UTC-4 (EDT)
- ZIP Codes: 02543 (Woods Hole); 02540 (Falmouth)
- Area code: 508
- FIPS code: 25-81245
- GNIS feature ID: 0617060

Woods Hole is a census-designated place in the town of Falmouth in Barnstable County, Massachusetts, United States. It lies at the extreme southwestern corner of Cape Cod, near Martha's Vineyard and the Elizabeth Islands. As of the 2020 census, Woods Hole had a population of 834.

It is the site of several marine science institutions, including Woods Hole Oceanographic Institution, the Marine Biological Laboratory, the Woodwell Climate Research Center, NOAA's Northeast Fisheries Science Center (which started the Woods Hole scientific community in 1871), the Woods Hole Science Aquarium, a USGS coastal and marine geology center, and the home campus of the Sea Education Association.

Woods Hole is also the site of United States Coast Guard Sector Southeastern New England (formerly USCG Group Woods Hole), the Nobska Light lighthouse, and the terminus of the Steamship Authority ferry route between Cape Cod and the island of Martha's Vineyard.

== History ==
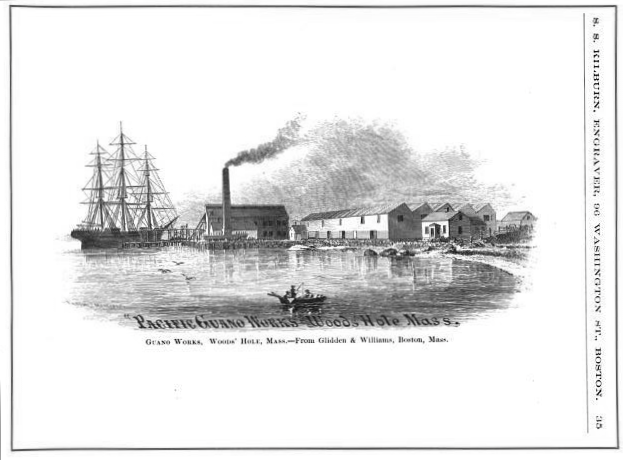
Pacific Guano Works, Woods Hole, c. 1860s; engraving by S.S. Kilburn

Historically, Woods Hole included one of the few good harbors (along with Hyannis) on the southern side of Cape Cod (i.e. Great Harbor, contained by Penzance Point). The community, originally spelled "Wood's Holl", became a center for whaling, shipping, and fishing, prior to its dominance today by tourism and marine research.

Woods Hole was first used as a fishing ground by the Wampanoag people. In 1602, Bartholomew Gosnold first set foot on Woods Hole, and European settlement began. A Wampanoag Indian deed dated 1679 details the transfer of land to early European settlers. The deed was witnessed by Shearjashub Bourne and Thomas Hinckley.

In early 1779, the Swift farm was raided by British Marines and sailors looking for food, but were scared off by a skirmish with the town militia. The British then attempted to burn down the town the next day, but were repulsed by a fort built overnight on Surf Drive Beach, which led to a five hour battle.

By the 1820s, Woods Hole had become a significant whaling station, with whale ships being first built by Elijah Swift and Ward Mayhew Parker. The village prospered from whaling, ship outfitting, oil, and whalebone processing until the industry declined in the 1860s. Many building names remain a testament to the town's whaling history, such as the Marine Biological Laboratory's Candle House.

Following the decline of whaling, Woods Hole was the home of the Pacific Guano Company (1863–1889), which produced fertilizer from guano imported from islands in the Pacific Ocean, the Caribbean, and the coast of South Carolina. After the firm went bankrupt in 1889, Long Neck – the peninsula on which their factory was located – was renamed Penzance Point and was developed with shingle-style summer homes for bankers and lawyers from New York and Boston. This marked the beginning of Woods Hole as a seasonal retreat for elite urbanites, a pattern seen in other Cape Cod communities. Notable property owners on Penzance Point at the beginning of the twentieth century included Seward Prosser of New York's Bankers Trust Company; Francis Bartow, a partner in J. P. Morgan and Company; Joseph Lee, a partner in Lee, Higginson & Co.; and Franklin A. Park, an executive of Singer Sewing Machine. Other notable businessmen established homes on Gansett Point, Nobska Point, and at Quissett Harbor, further from the village center.

Woods Hole's development as an epicenter of marine biology and oceanography accelerated in the mid-1800s. Spencer Baird, Secretary of the Smithsonian Institution, Permanent Secretary of the American Association for the Advancement of Science, and naturalist interested in fisheries arrived in Woods Hole in 1871. Upon understanding the need to understand recent declines in New England fisheries, he proposed the establishment of the U.S. Commission of Fish and Fisheries (to become the National Marine Fisheries Service) and became its first commissioner, without pay. In 1888, the Marine Biological Laboratory (MBL) was founded, attracting Nobel Prize laureates and pioneering research in biology and medicine. In 1930, the Woods Hole Oceanographic Institution (WHOI) was established, now the largest independent oceanographic research facility in the U.S., renowned for its contributions to marine science and exploration.

Tourism continued to grow in the late 1800s with rail service from Boston to Woods Hole. Woods Hole today is best known for its ocean science institutions and as an entryway to Martha's Vineyard, with tourism being a major driver of the local economy. The seasonal influx of visitors—vacationers, summer residents, and day-trippers—continues to define the rhythm of village life and supports local businesses, restaurants, and museums. The Woods Hole Yacht Club was established in 1896 and incorporated in 1897. In 1899, the Woods Hole Golf course was started. Around 1919, it was expanded to 18 holes.

In 1976, The Woods Hole Foundation was created to address evolving community needs and to maintain and improve the quality of life and the character of the community. The Foundation's grants have ranged from preservation of buildings (e.g. the Woods Hole Post Office) to operating funds for local service organizations.

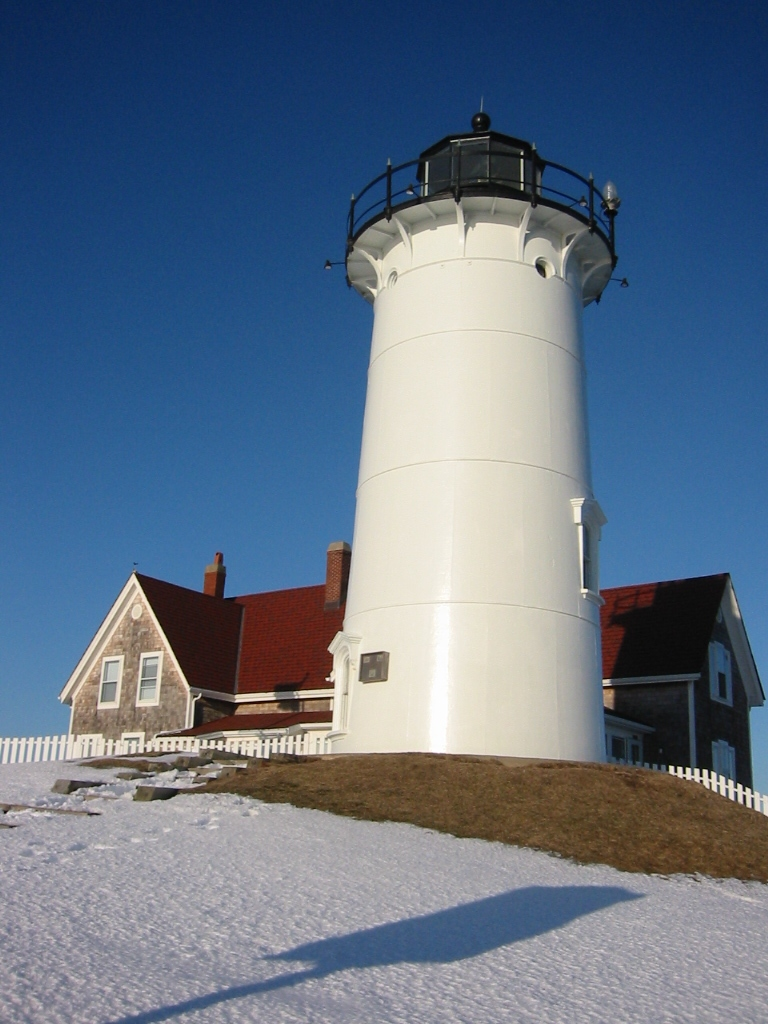
Nobska Light

== Geography ==
Woods Hole is located at the southwestern tip of the town of Falmouth (and of Cape Cod) at 41°31′36″N 70°39′47″W (41.526730, -70.663184). The term "Woods Hole" refers to a strait named Woods Hole, which separates Cape Cod from the Elizabeth Islands (specifically, Uncatena Island and Nonamesset Island) and which boats, yachts, and small ferries can use to travel between Vineyard Sound and Buzzards Bay. The strait is known for its extremely strong current, approaching four knots. It is one of four straits allowing maritime passage between Buzzards Bay and Vineyard Sound; the others are Canapitsit Channel, Quick's Hole and Robinson's Hole. Published yearly is the Eldridge Tide and Pilot Book, which has a detailed reference section showing the complex pattern of tides and currents. Ferries operated by The Woods Hole, Martha's Vineyard and Nantucket Steamship Authority run regularly between Woods Hole and Martha's Vineyard. The present Woods Hole, Martha's Vineyard and Nantucket Steamship Authority was formed from the New Bedford, Martha's Vineyard, and Nantucket Steamboat Company, which in turn was a consolidation of earlier companies dating to the early 19th century, just before the railroad arrived.

Much of Woods Hole centers around the enclosed harbor of Eel Pond. The Eel Pond Bridge, a bascule drawbridge at the mouth of the harbor, allows boats to enter and exit the harbor according to a fixed schedule posted on the side of the bridge.

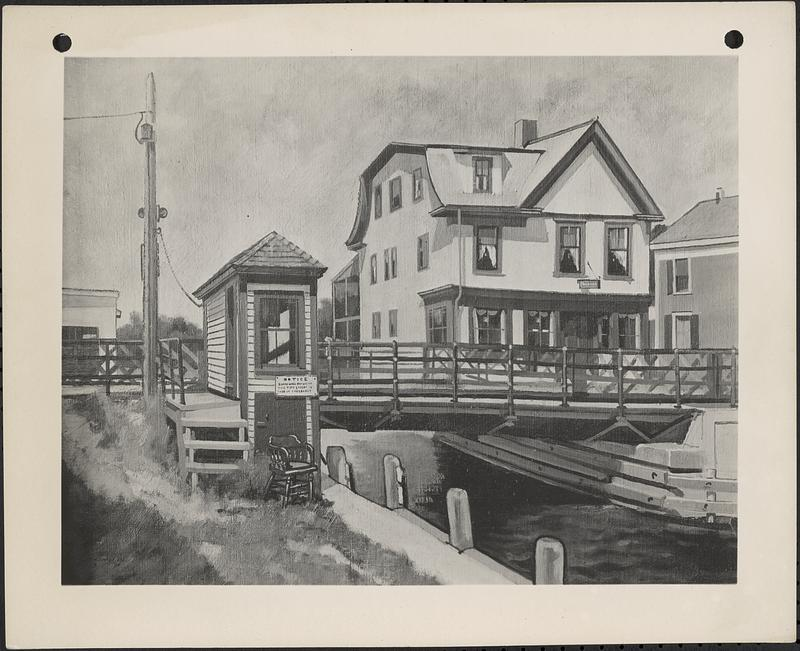

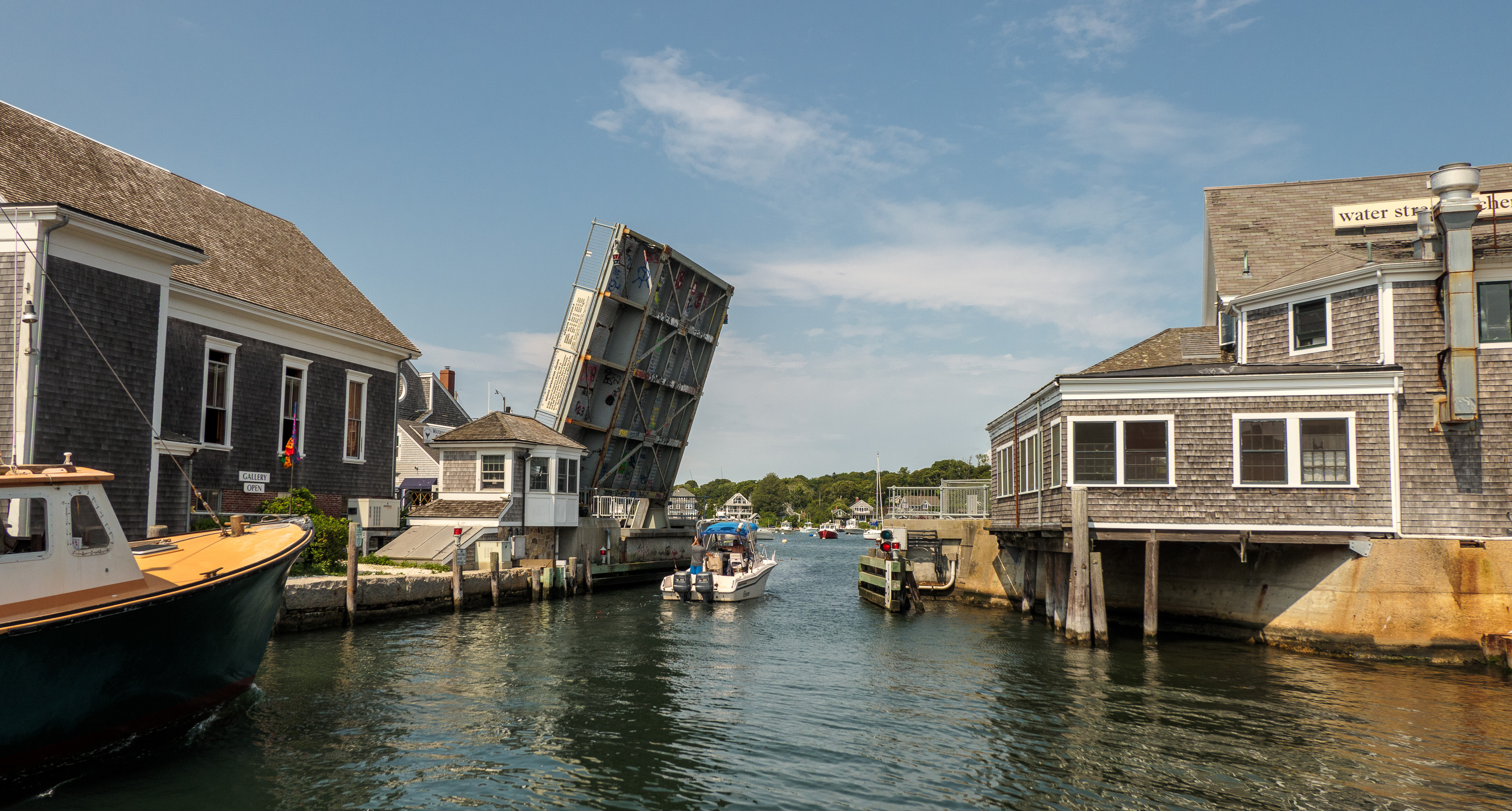

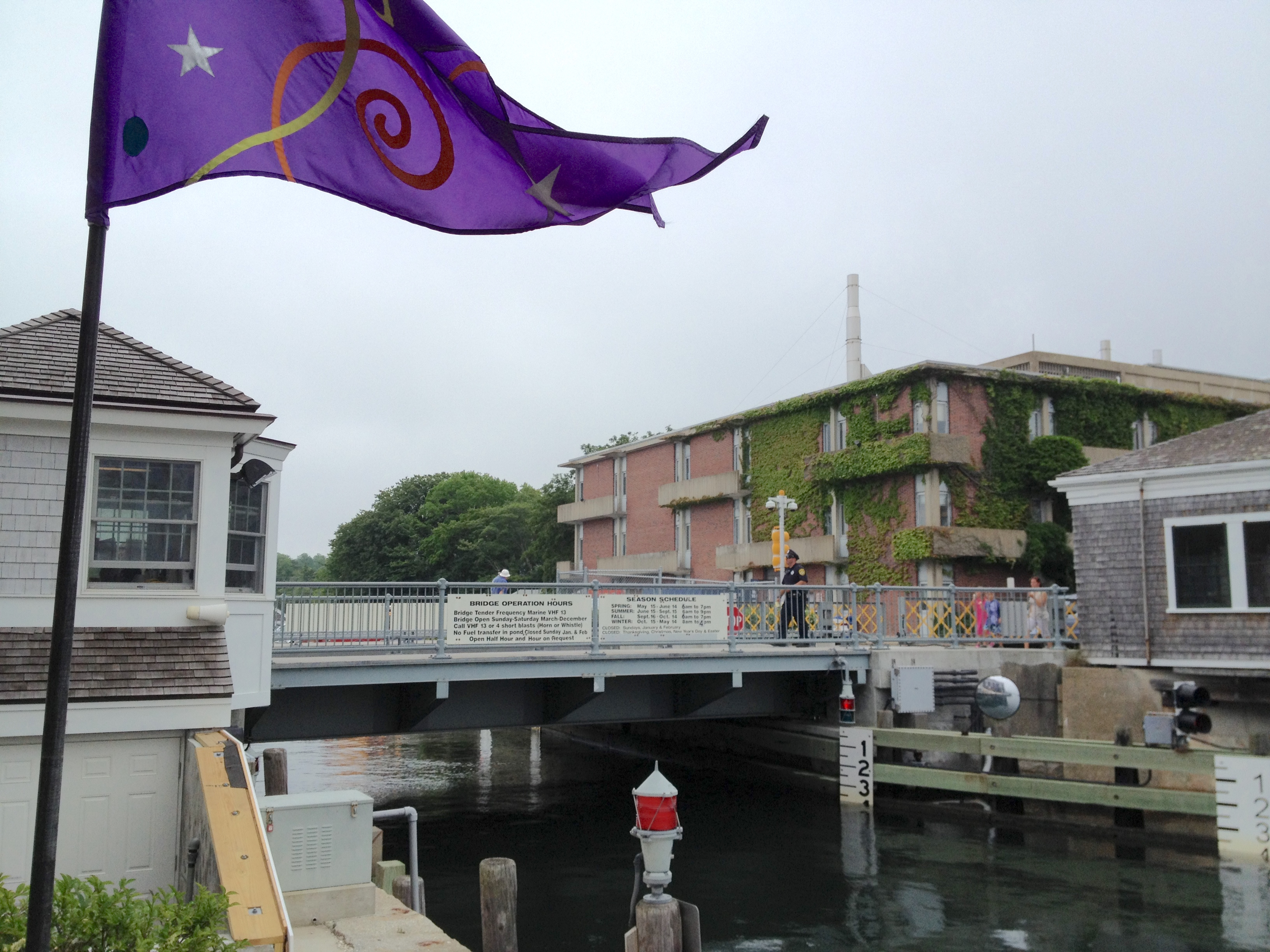

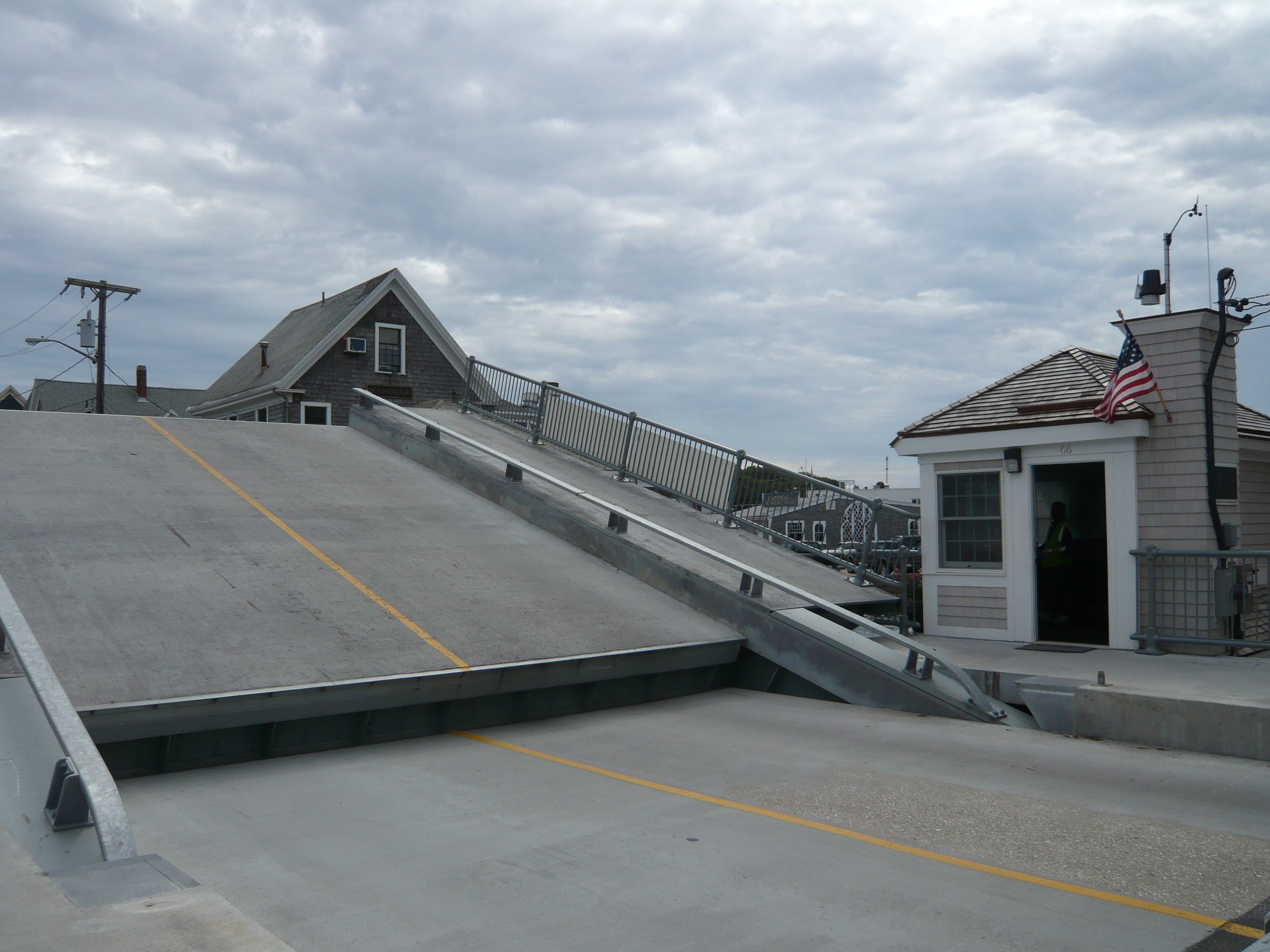

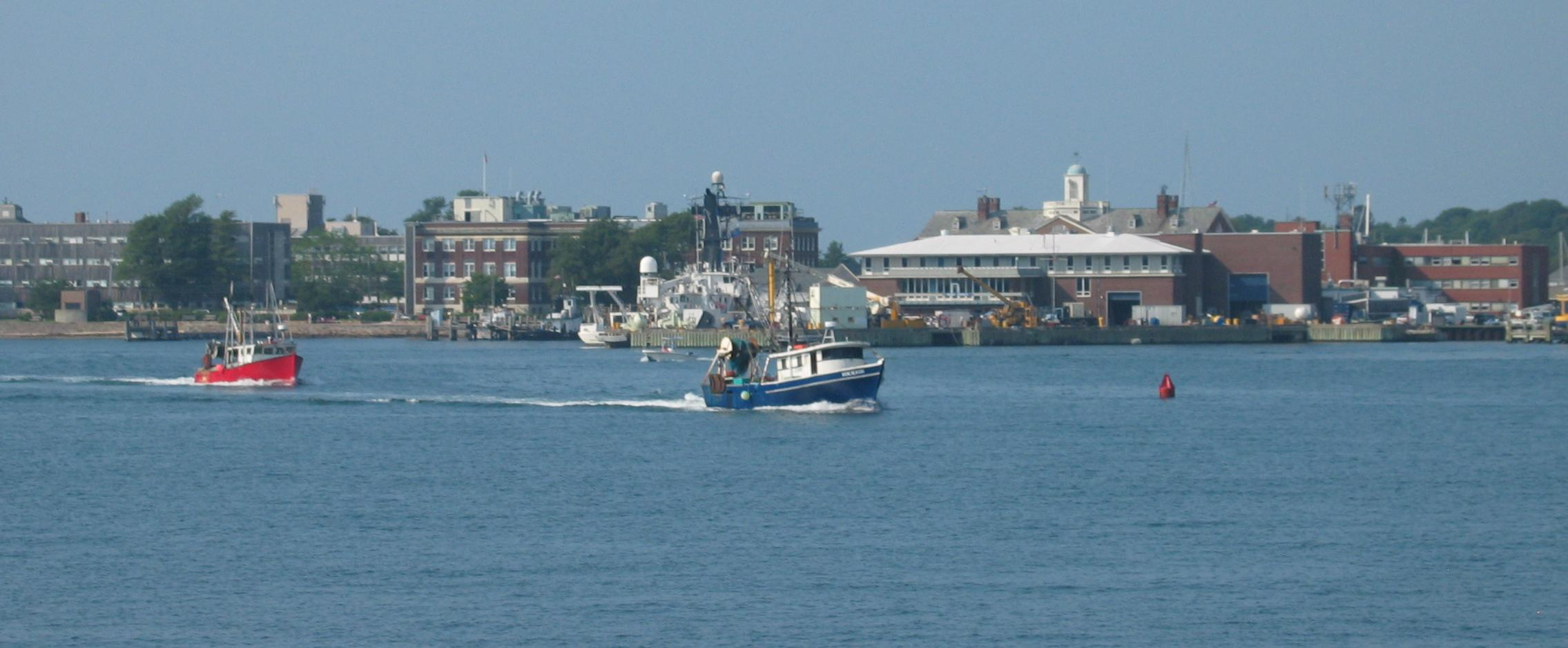
A view of downtown Woods Hole from the water, including MBL and WHOI buildings

Nobska Light, a lighthouse at Nobska Point, is operated by the United States Coast Guard, and the accompanying house is the home of the commander of the Coast Guard base at Little Harbor.

The Knob is a local landmark on the Northern side of Woods Hole, and is a rocky outcropping that overlooks Buzzards Bay and Quisset Harbor. It is a part of the privately owned Salt Pond bird sanctuaries.

According to the United States Census Bureau, the Woods Hole CDP has a total area of 3.9 square miles (10.1 km^{2}), of which 2.1 square miles (5.5 km^{2}) is land and 1.8 square miles (4.6 km^{2}) (45.24%) is water.

=== Climate ===
The climate is now humid subtropical (Cfa) according to the latest temperature numbers. In Massachusetts this climate is only found here, in the Elizabeth Islands, and on Martha's Vineyard.

Climate data for Woods Hole, Falmouth, Massachusetts (1991–2020 normals)
Month	Jan	Feb	Mar	Apr	May	Jun	Jul	Aug	Sep	Oct	Nov	Dec	Year
Mean daily maximum °F (°C)	39.1 (3.9)	40.5 (4.7)	44.7 (7.1)	54.8 (12.7)	64.0 (17.8)	72.4 (22.4)	79.2 (26.2)	79.0 (26.1)	72.8 (22.7)	62.5 (16.9)	53.3 (11.8)	44.7 (7.1)	58.9 (14.9)
Daily mean °F (°C)	32.1 (0.1)	33.0 (0.6)	37.2 (2.9)	46.9 (8.3)	56.1 (13.4)	65.0 (18.3)	71.8 (22.1)	71.8 (22.1)	66.0 (18.9)	55.8 (13.2)	46.4 (8.0)	38.2 (3.4)	51.7 (10.9)
Mean daily minimum °F (°C)	25.1 (−3.8)	25.4 (−3.7)	29.7 (−1.3)	39.1 (3.9)	48.1 (8.9)	57.6 (14.2)	64.4 (18.0)	64.5 (18.1)	59.1 (15.1)	49.1 (9.5)	39.6 (4.2)	31.6 (−0.2)	44.4 (6.9)
Source: NOAA

== Falmouth Road Race ==
The annual Falmouth Road Race brings thousands of runners to Woods Hole in August each year. The route of the 7-mile (11 km) race starts outside the front door of the Captain Kidd tavern and follows the shore of Vineyard Sound through Falmouth to Shipwrecked (historically, the British Beer Company, which closed due to COVID-19), another tavern, in Falmouth Heights.

== Education ==
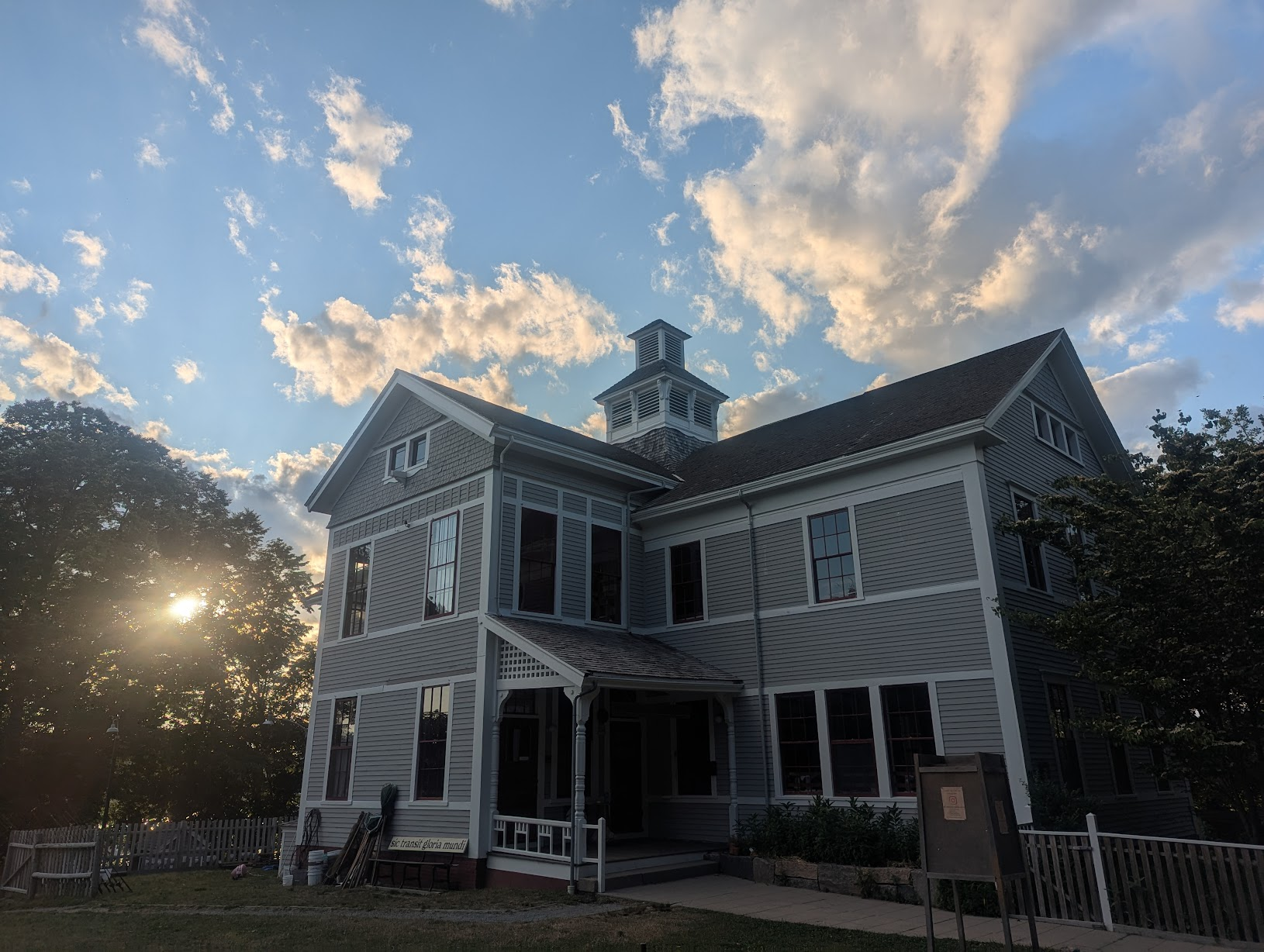
The Woods Hole School provides science classes for children.

The Woods Hole School is the home of the Children's School of Science. Founded in 1913, this institution (locally known as "CSS" and "Science School") provides science classes for students between seven and 16 years old that focus on scientific investigation by observation. Students regularly visit ecosystems around the village to study the organisms in their natural environments, such as the Sippewissett Salt Marsh. The Children's School of Science draws upon the talent brought to the village by the research institutions but also educates the children of both scientists and locals. Some mention of the Woods Hole Oceanographic Institution is made in the 1975 blockbuster film Jaws as having been the center of research for the fictional character Matt Hooper. Hooper is described as a marine biologist, focusing on the study of sharks. Coincidentally, a great white shark was spotted some years later near Woods Hole in September 2004.

Woods Hole is part of the Falmouth public school district, served by Mullen-Hall Elementary, Morse Pond Middle School, Lawrence Junior High School, and Falmouth High School. Woods Hole students also often attend Upper Cape Cod Regional Technical High School, Sturgis Charter Public School, and Falmouth Academy.

== Demographics ==
Historical population
Census	Pop.	Note	%±
2020	834		—
U.S. Decennial Census

As of the census of 2000, there were 925 people, 459 households, and 212 families residing in the CDP. The population density was 165.3/km^{2} (427.9/mi^{2}). There were 942 housing units at an average density of 168.4/km^{2} (435.8/mi^{2}). The racial makeup of the CDP was 94.70% White, 1.62% African American, 0.54% Native American, 1.84% Asian, 0.22% from other races, and 1.08% from two or more races. Hispanic or Latino of any race were 0.97% of the population.

There were 459 households, out of which 14.8% had children under the age of 18 living with them, 39.7% were married couples living together, 5.4% had a female householder with no husband present, and 53.6% were non-families. 40.5% of all households were made up of individuals, and 17.9% had someone living alone who was 65 years of age or older. The average household size was 1.94 and the average family size was 2.58.

In the CDP, the population was spread out, with 13.5% under the age of 18, 7.1% from 18 to 24, 25.7% from 25 to 44, 26.4% from 45 to 64, and 27.2% who were 65 years of age or older. The median age was 48 years. For every 100 females, there are 94.7 males. For every 100 females age 18 and over, there were 88.7 males.

The median income for a household in the CDP was $47,604, and the median income for a family was $57,969. Males had a median income of $31,964 versus $31,875 for females. The per capita income for the CDP was $30,752. None of the families and 5.3% of the population were living below the poverty line, including no under 18 and 6.4% of those over 64.

== Notable residents ==
- Irving Langmuir, the scientist, also lived in Woods Hole and died there on August 16, 1957.
- The eminent Hungarian born biochemist and Nobel prize laureate, Albert Imre Szent-Györgyi de Nagyrápolt died in Woods Hole in 1986.
- Nobel Laureate , David Baltimore, died at his home in Woods Hole on September 6th, 2025.

== See also ==
- Woods Hole Conference
- Jane's Island, a 1931 Newbery Honor novel by Marjorie Hill Allee set in Woods Hole
- Statue of Rachel Carson
