= Nobska Light =

Lighthouse near Woods Hole, Massachusetts, US

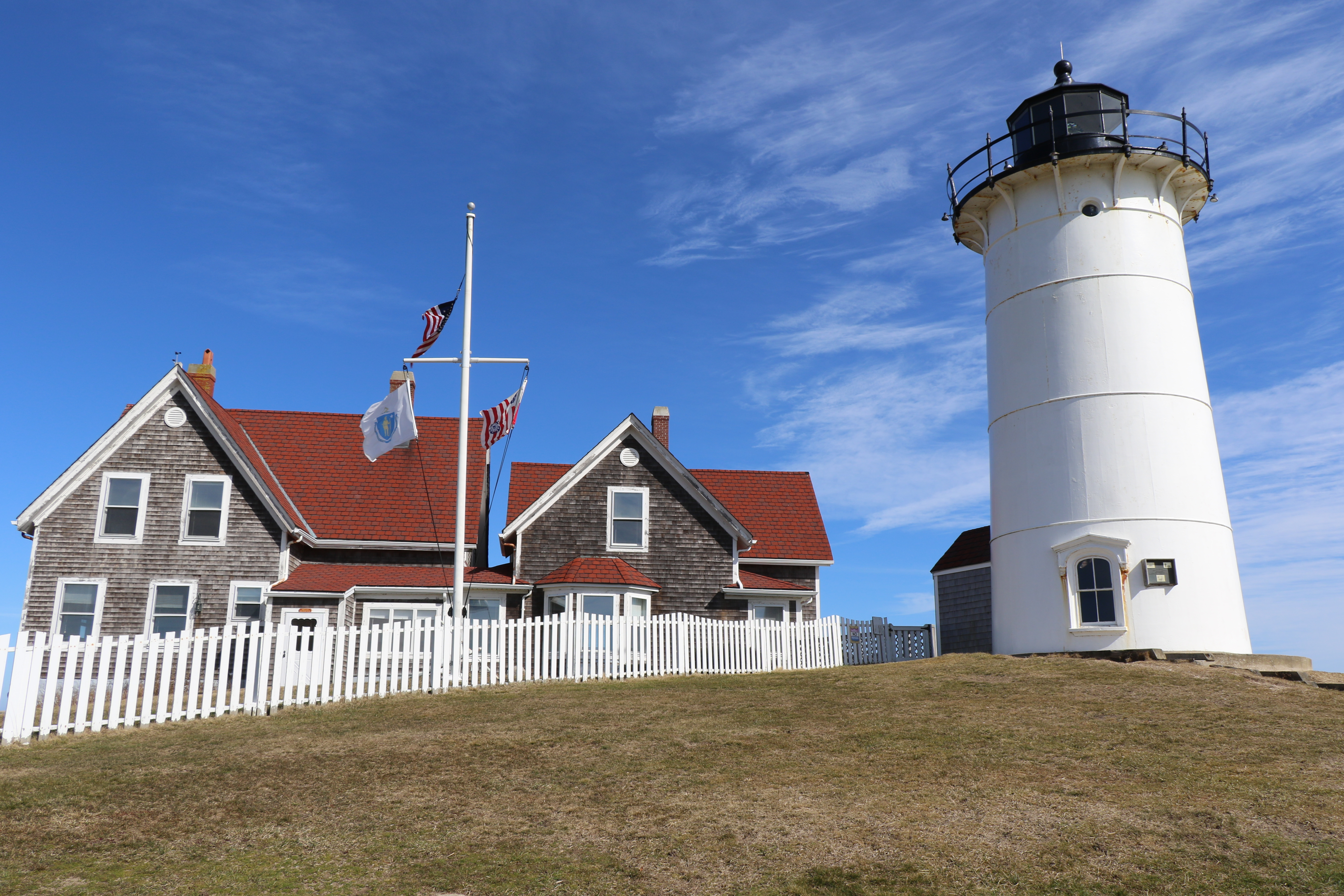
- Nobska Light in 2016
- Location: Nobska Rd., Woods Hole, Massachusetts
- Coordinates: 41°30′56.9″N 70°39′18.4″W

Tower
- Constructed: 1829
- Foundation: Natural Emplaced
- Construction: Iron with brick lining
- Automated: 1985
- Height: 40 feet (12 m)
- Shape: Cylindrical
- Markings: White with black lantern
- Heritage: National Register of Historic Places listed place
- Fog signal: 2 blasts every 30s

Light
- First lit: 1876 (current tower)
- Focal height: 87 feet (27 m)
- Lens: Fifth-order Fresnel lens (1876), Fourth-order Fresnel lens (1888)
- Range: White 13 nautical miles (24 km; 15 mi), Red 11 nautical miles (20 km; 13 mi)
- Characteristic: Fl W, 6 sec. Red sector
- Nobska Point Light Station
- U.S. National Register of Historic Places
- Area: 2.1 acres (0.85 ha)
- Architectural style: Italianate, Federal Revival
- MPS: Lighthouses of Massachusetts TR
- NRHP reference No.: 87001483
- Added to NRHP: June 15, 1987

Nobska Light, originally called Nobsque Light, also known as Nobska Point Light, is a lighthouse located near the division between Buzzards Bay, Nantucket Sound, and Vineyard Sound in the settlement of Woods Hole, Massachusetts on the southwestern tip of Cape Cod, Massachusetts. It overlooks Martha's Vineyard and Nonamesset Island. The light station was established in 1828, with the tower protruding above the keeper's house, and was replaced in 1876 by the current 42 foot tall iron tower. The light station was added to the National Register of Historic Places as Nobska Point Light Station in 1987.

== Description and history ==
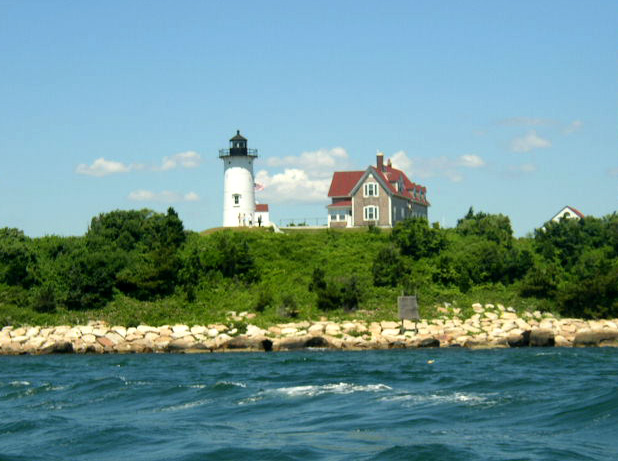
Nobska Point, 2005

Nobska Light is set at the very southwestern tip of Cape Cod, separated from the shore by Nobska Road. The light station includes four buildings: the tower, the keeper's house, a radio beacon house, and a small oil house. The tower has a brick interior and a metal exterior, formed out of four rings of iron paneling, and rises to a height of 40 feet (12 m). The first three panels each have a single sash window with an Italianate surround, while the fourth level sports four porthole windows. The tower is topped by a ten-sided lantern house with an iron balcony and railing encircling it. A wood frame entry vestibule with gable roof projects toward the keeper's house. The oil house is a small brick structure with a gable roof, while the radio beacon house is a larger brick structure, also with a gable roof.

The light station was established in 1828, with the original light mounted on top of the keeper's house. In 1876 the present tower was built, along with one portion of the keeper's house and the oil house. The keeper's house was built in two stages, and was built to house both a keeper and an assistant. It is a 1 1/2-story Cape style wood-frame house, whose older section was built in 1876; the other half was built in 1905. A central single-story cross-gable wing extends toward the tower, with enclosed porches on either side.

In 1937, a 125-foot steel radiobeacon tower was installed and the reed horn fog signal replaced with a diaphragm over the next decade. In 1939 the United States Coast Guard replaced the U.S. Lighthouse Service as the agency responsible for maintaining the light but a civilian light keeper remained on site until November 1973 and was replaced by the Coast Guard. Before Joseph Hindley retired, he may have been the last civilian light keeper in New England.

In 1985 the lighthouse was automated and the last keeper retired. His house was converted into the residence for the Commanding Officer of United States Coast Guard Sector Southeastern New England. It was listed on the National Register of Historic Places in 1987. In 2012, the house was deemed in need of serious maintenance and was discontinued as a residence.

=== Light keepers ===
Over the years, the following were the principal light keepers; some had previously been assistant keepers.

- Peter Daggett (1828-1849)
- William Davis (1849-1853)
- William Ferguson Jr. (1853-1861)
- Frederick Ray (1861-1874)
- Oliver A. Nickerson (1874-1911)
- George I. Cameron (1911-1913)
- George L.Lyon (1913-1929)
- John M. Scharff (1929-1955)
- Osborne E. Hallett (1955–1968)
- Joseph G. Hindley (1968–1972)
- Gary Williams (1972-1983)
- Charles Tebo (1983–1985)

=== Current status ===
In 2015, the Coast Guard decided to offer the light station to municipalities, non-profits or, lacking either of these, for private sale. Four organizations in Falmouth concerned with historic preservation banded together under the aegis of the Town of Falmouth to form a new non-profit to bid for the license for the lighthouse and its 2.3 acres site. The Town of Falmouth's application was accepted by the Coast Guard in September 2015 and the parties entered into a licensing process that is anticipated to be completed early in 2016.

The Town's plan is to hand over renovation and maintenance to the non-profit created for this purpose, the Friends of Nobska Light, which, when the restoration is complete, will operate the lighthouse as a museum open to the public for free. Nobska will then join the 100+ lighthouses in the country that have passed from federal to local and private management since global positioning systems and other improvement to navigation reduced the need for staffed lighthouses. The Friends of Nobska Light hope to offer tours of the light keeper's house by 2020. The tower may be open for tours in the summer of 2017. In the meantime, the site can be visited but not toured; a small parking lot is available. By late March 2017, the Friends of Nobska Light had raised roughly $66,000 but were planning to ask the Town to provide the approximately $265,000 still required to proceed with the restoration.

== Gallery ==
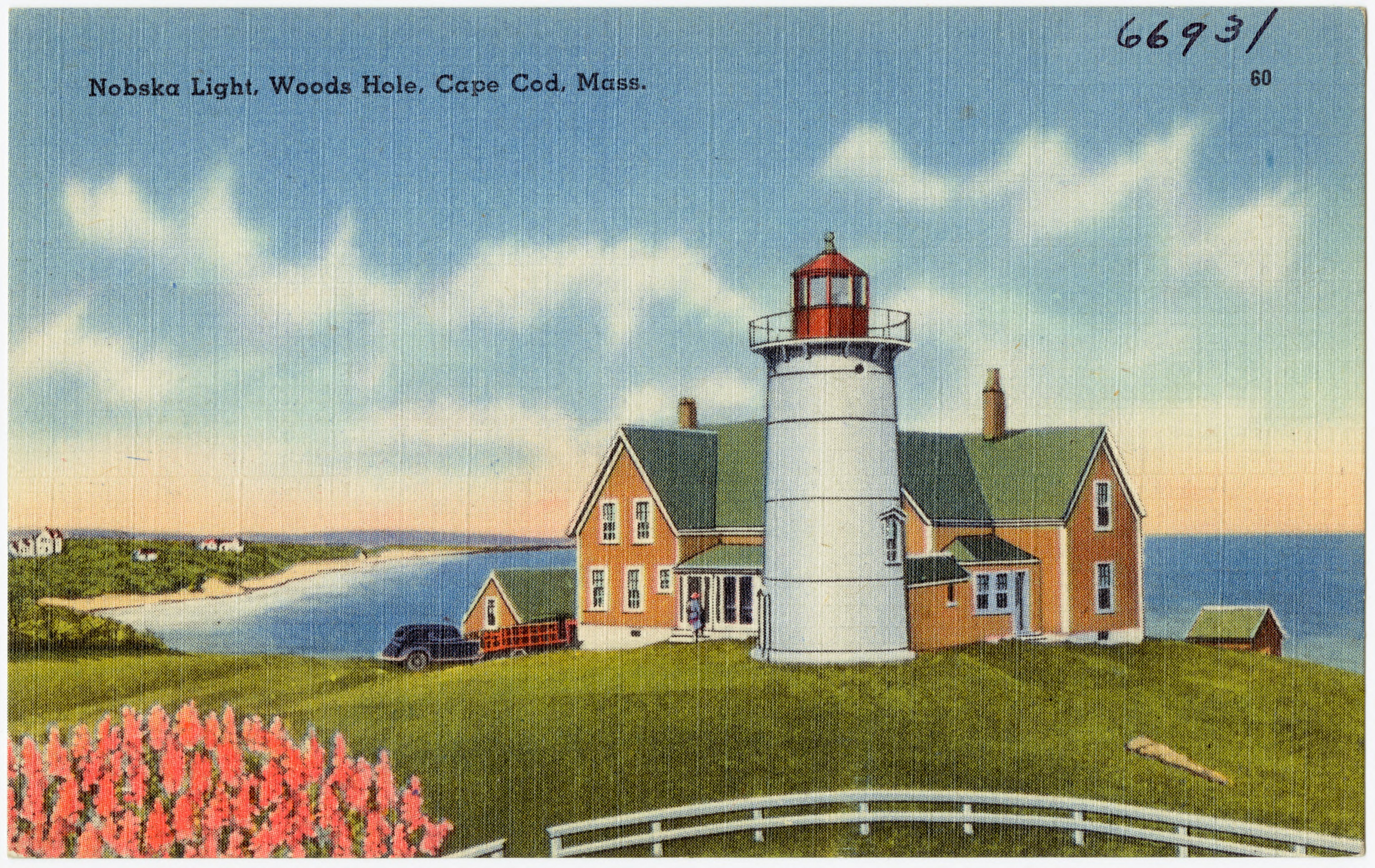
Circa 1930-1945

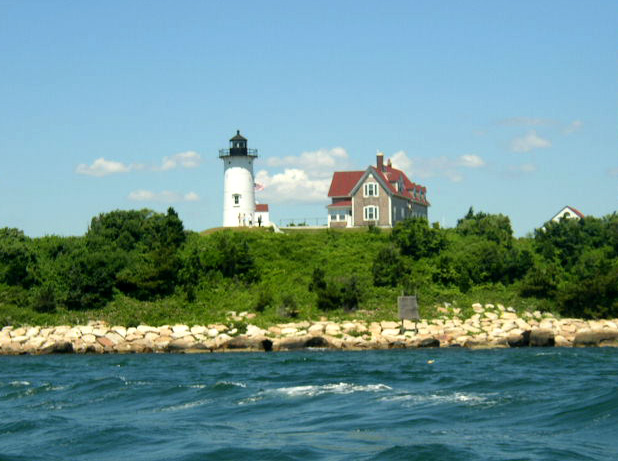
2005

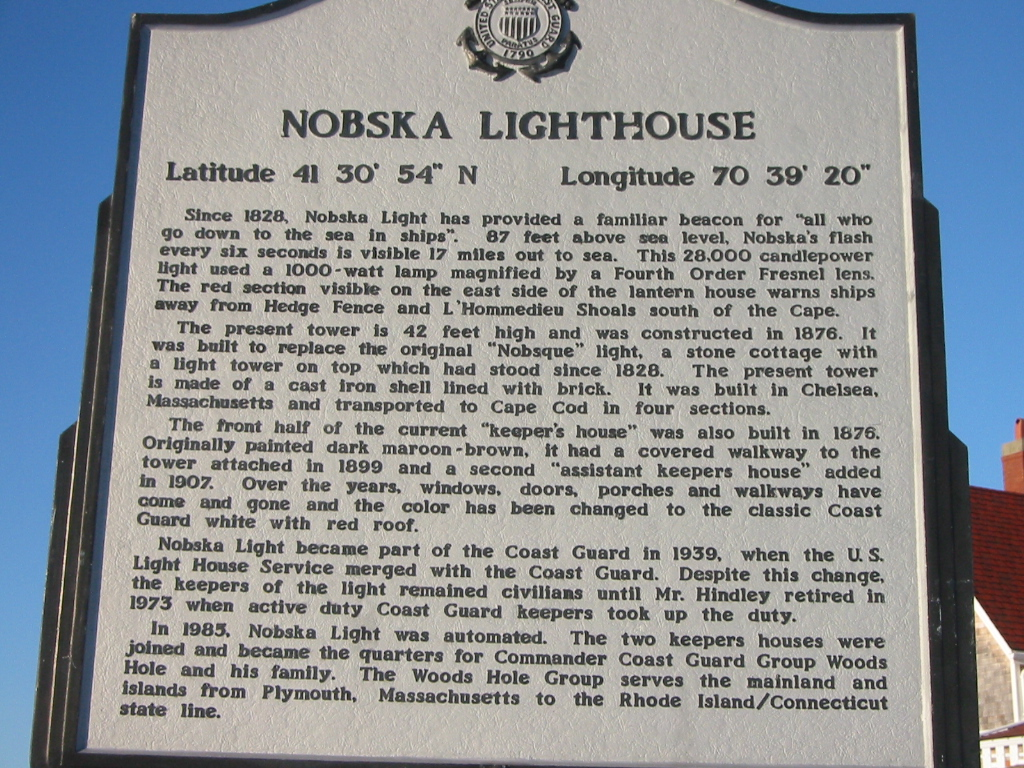
History of Nobska Point

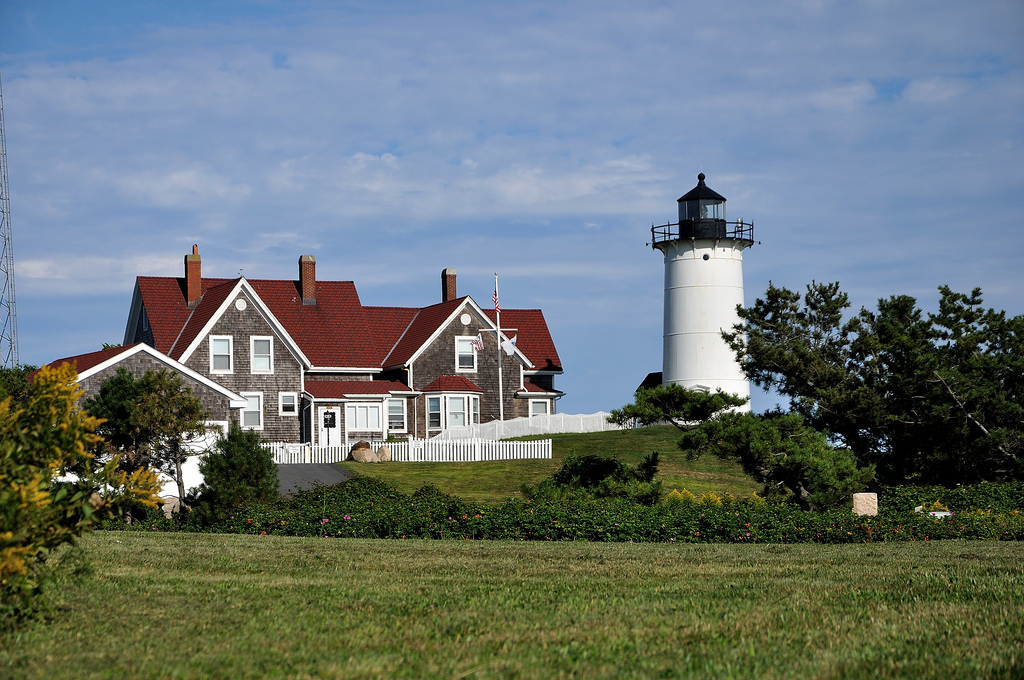
2009

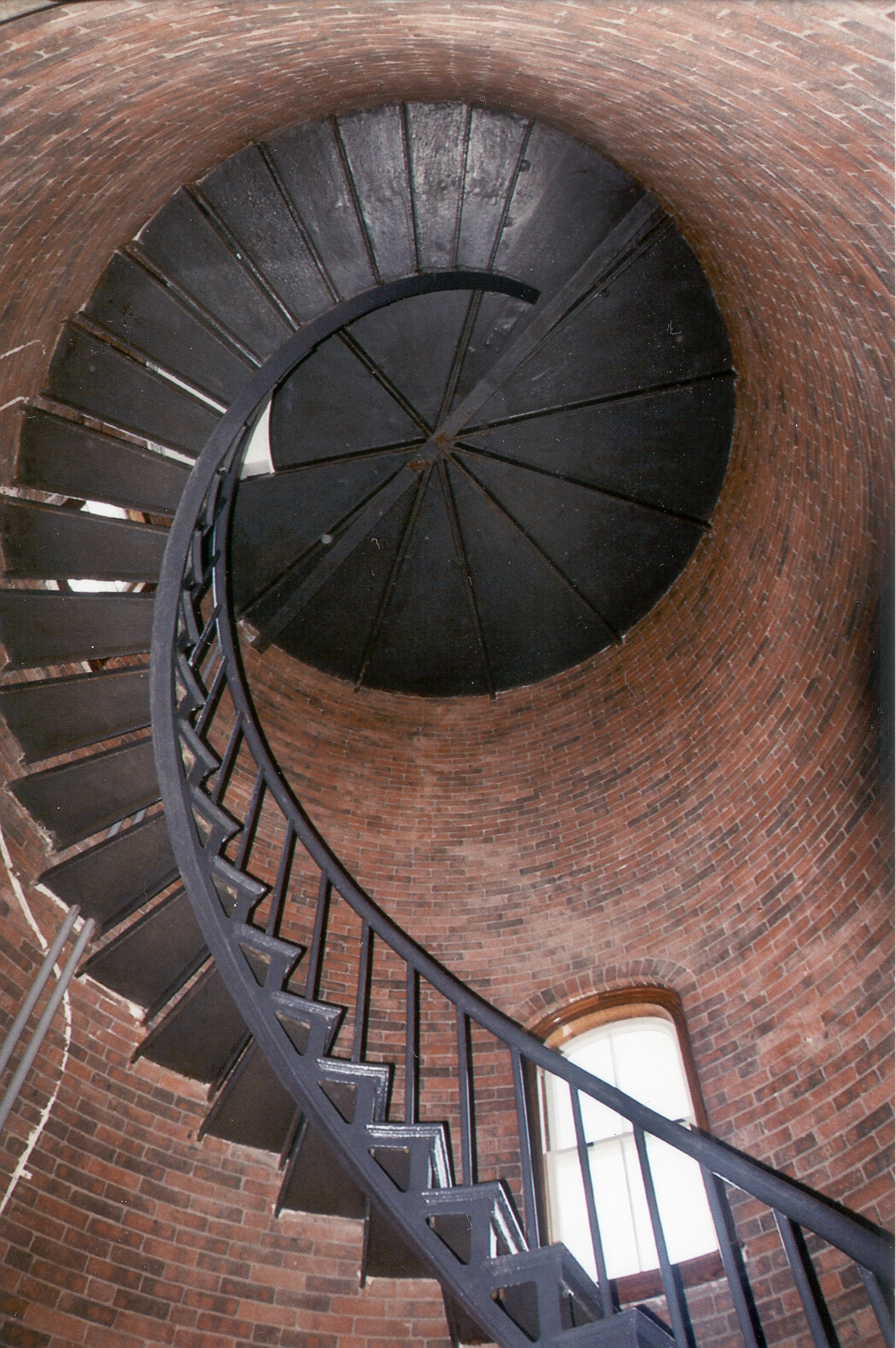
Brick lined interior & spiral stairway

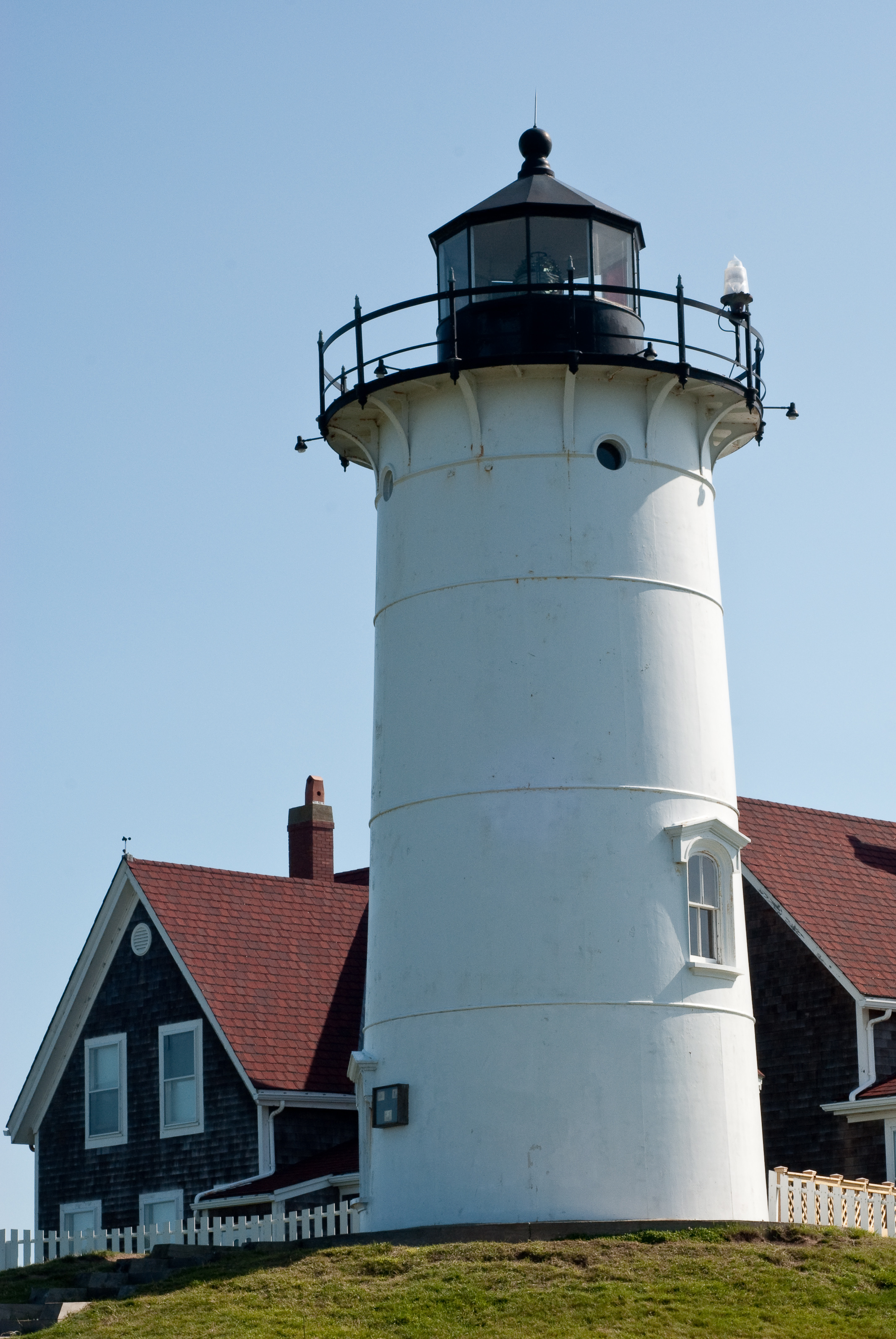
Nobska Point Light, 2009

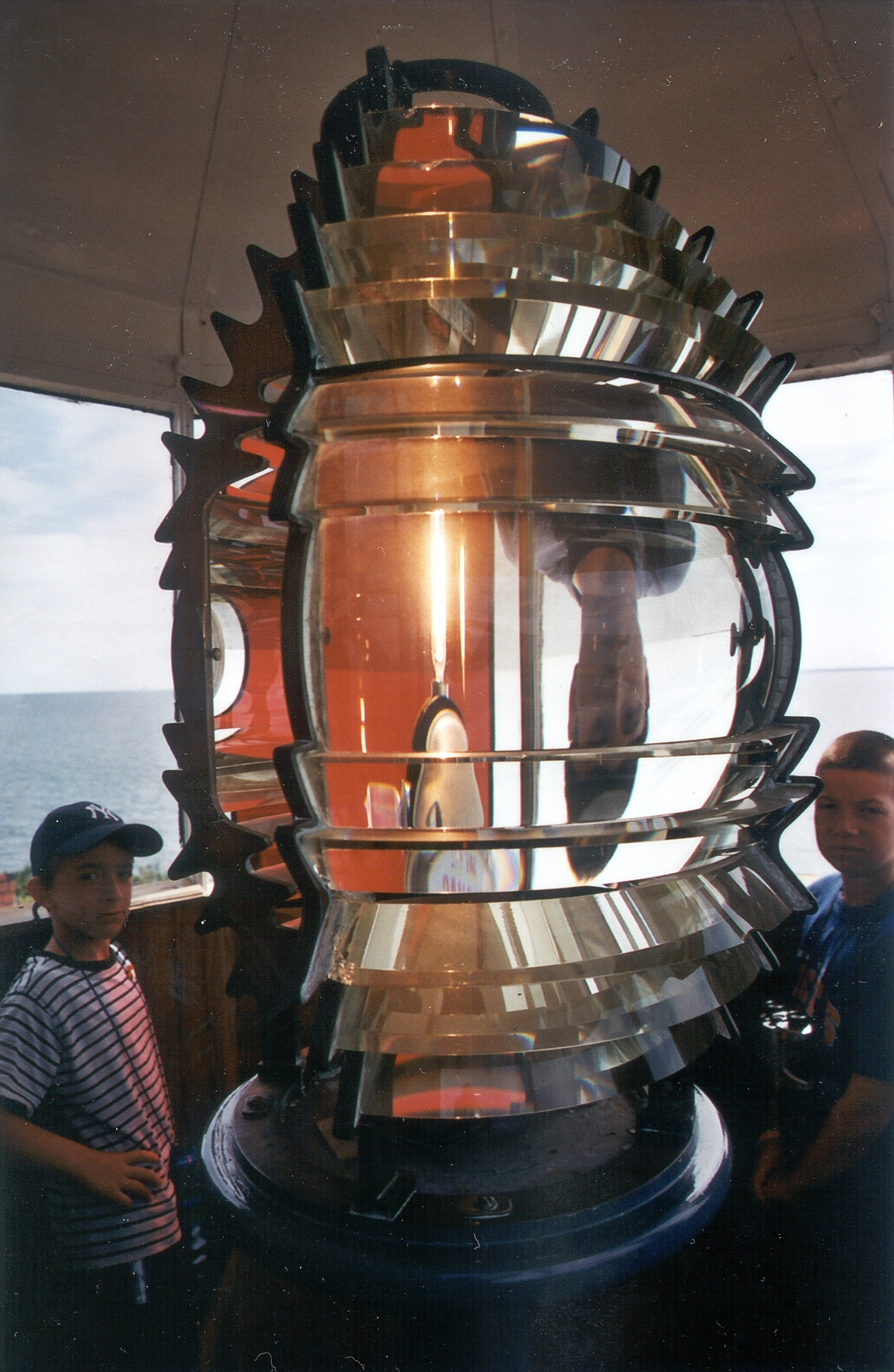
Fourth-Order Fresnel Lens at Nobska

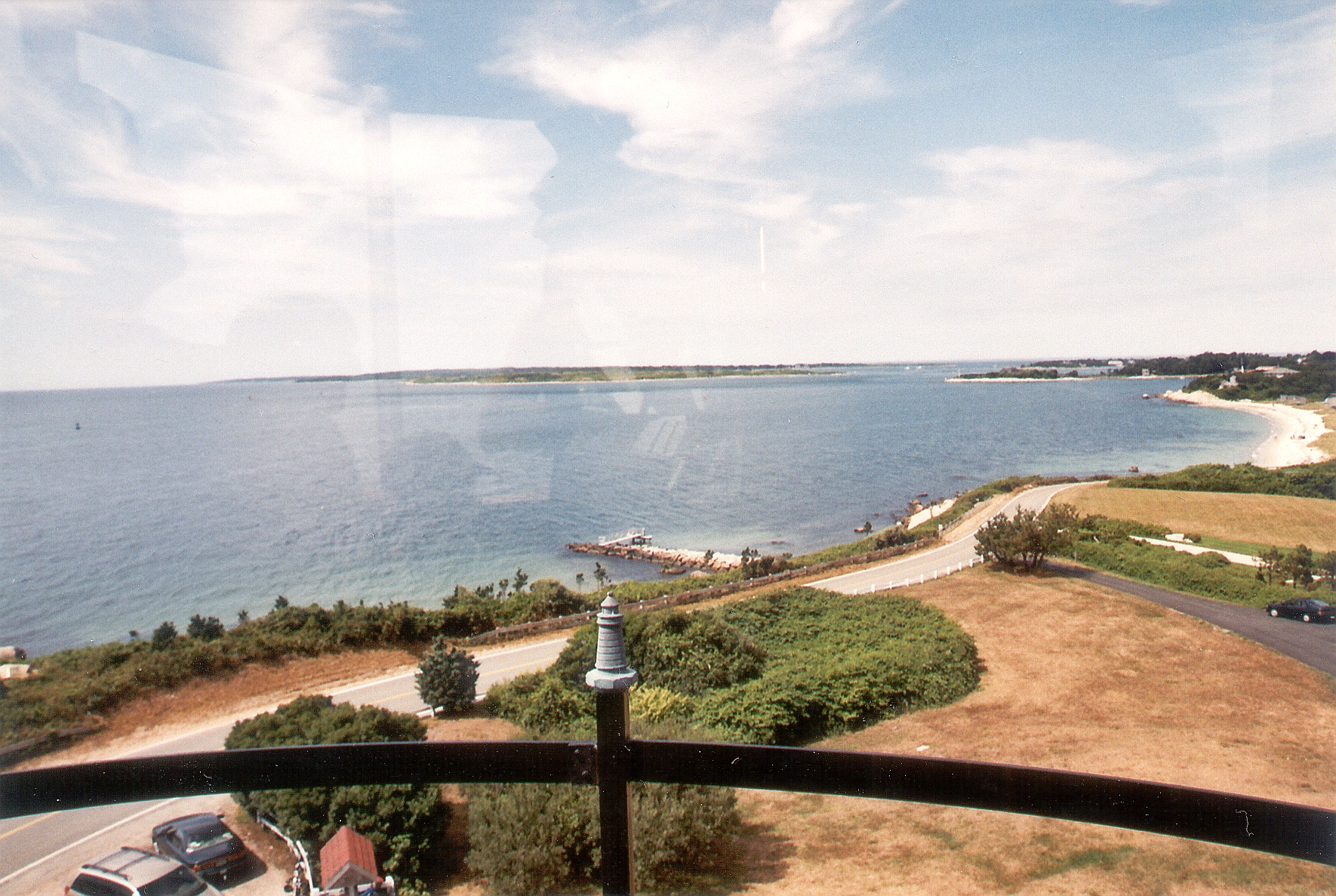
Vineyard Sound viewed through glass enclosure at Nobska Light

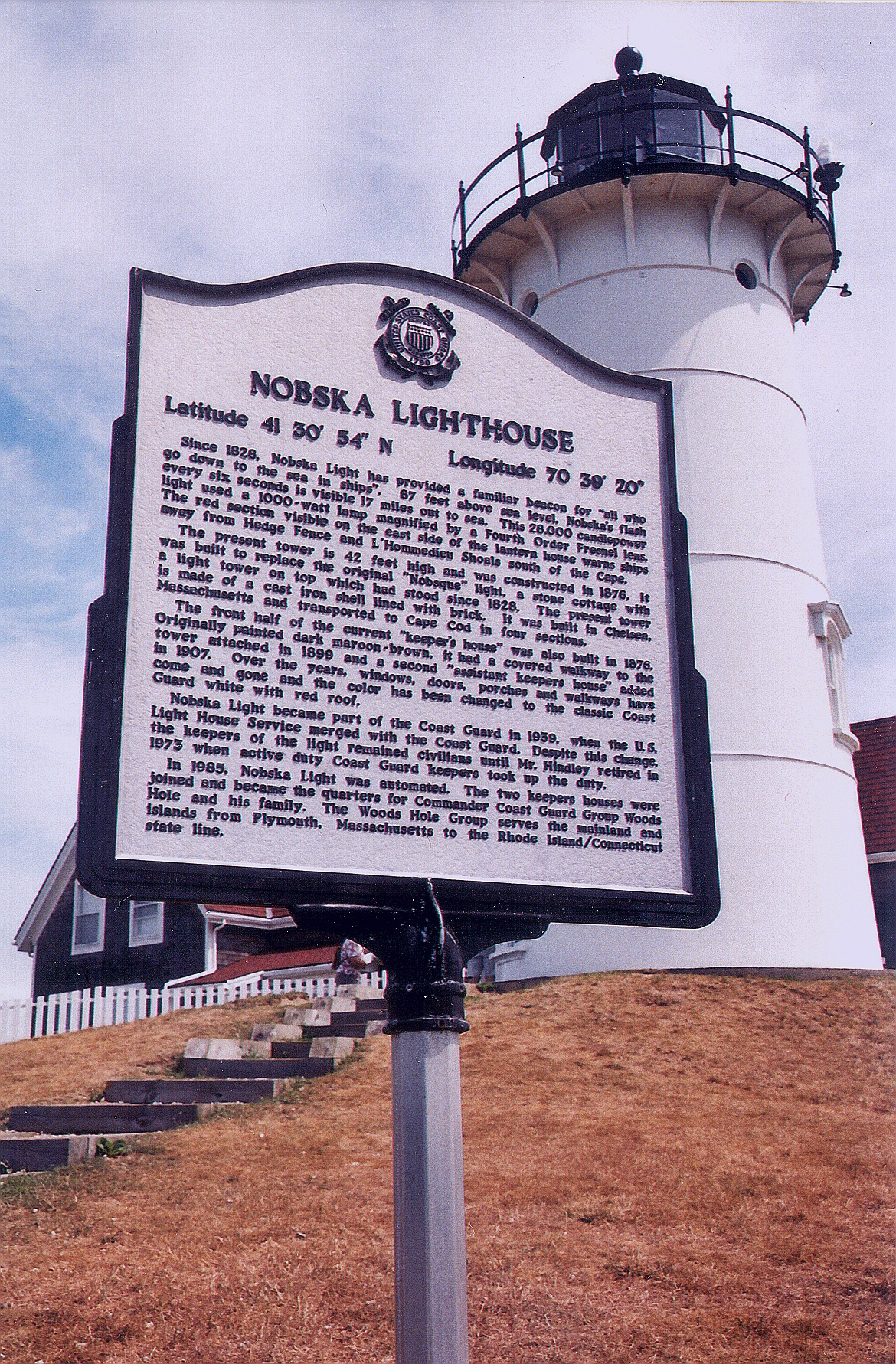
Signage at Nobska

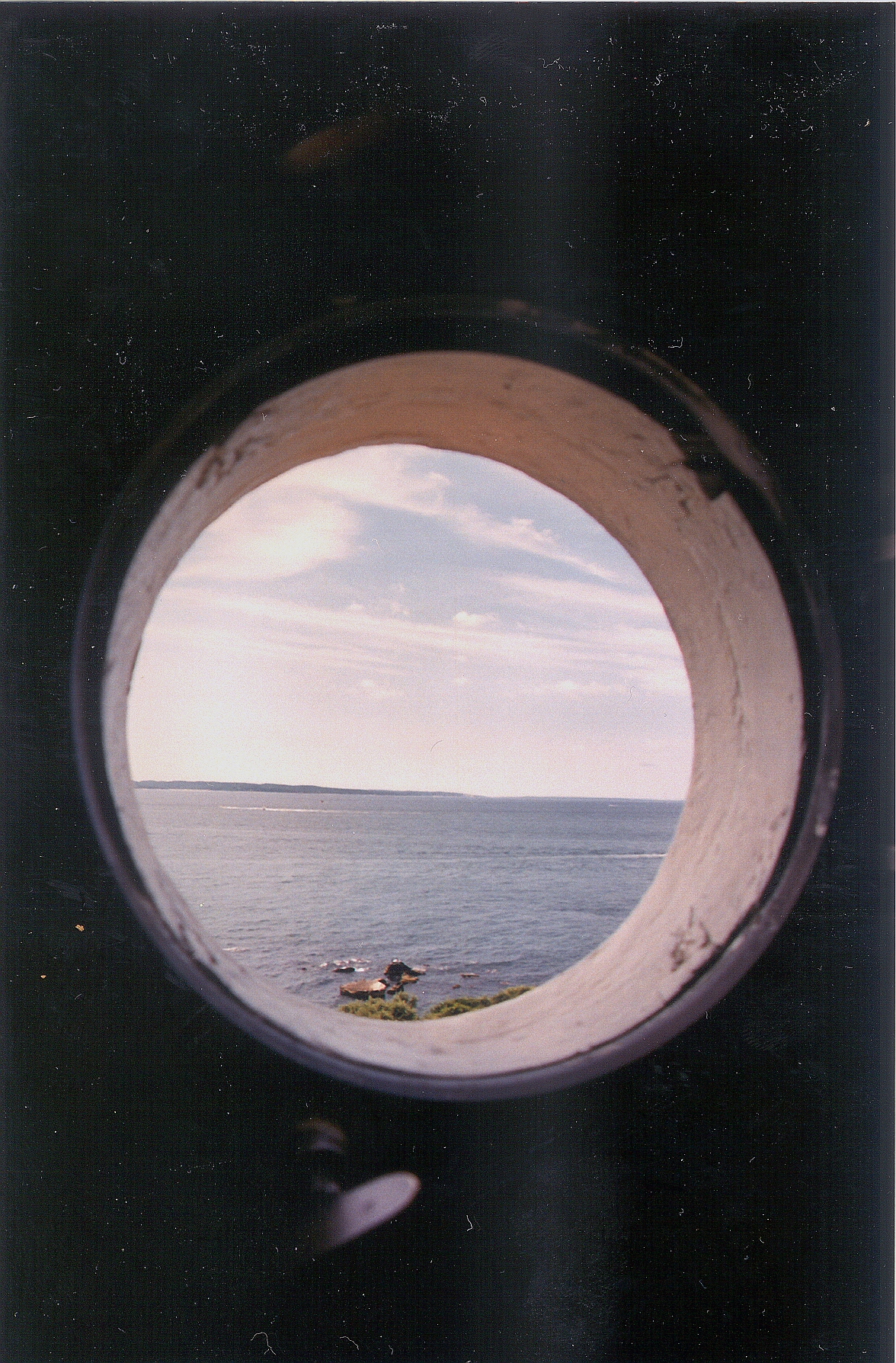
Looking at Vineyard Sound through the lighthouse porthole!

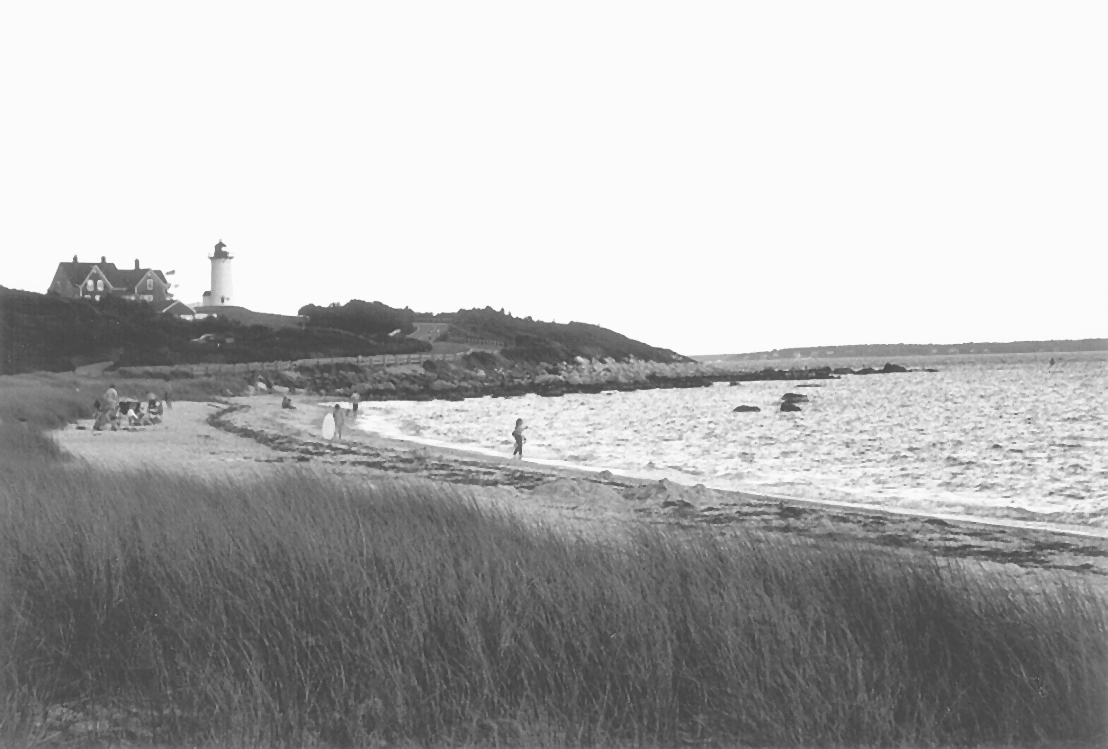
Local beach near Nobska Point, Woods Hole

== See also ==
- Cape Neddick Light, a similar lighthouse in Maine, constructed in 1879.
- National Register of Historic Places listings in Barnstable County, Massachusetts
