= Hawkes Pharmacy =

- U.S. National Register of Historic Places
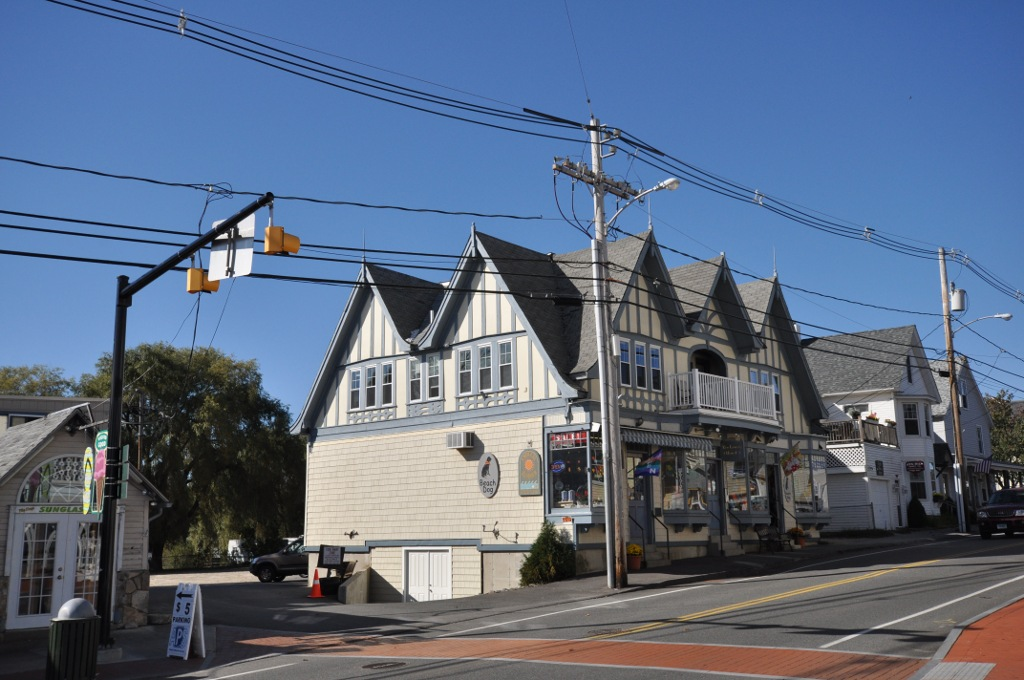

- Location within Maine Location within the United States
- Location: 7 Main St., York Beach, Maine
- Coordinates: 43°10′33″N 70°36′40″W
- Area: less than one acre
- Built: 1902
- Architect: Fred C. Watson
- Architectural style: Tudor Revival
- NRHP reference No.: 93001111
- Added to NRHP: October 14, 1993

The Hawkes Pharmacy, also known recently as the Rockaway Hotel, is a historic commercial building at 7 Main Street in York Beach, Maine. Built in 1902, it is the commercial building in the village of York Beach to retain significant historic features. The Tudor Revival building was listed on the National Register of Historic Places in 1993.

== Description and history ==
The Hawkes Pharmacy building is located on the west side of Main Street (United States Route 1A) in the heart of the village center of York Beach, a summer resort village on the coast of northern York, Maine. It is a two-story wood frame structure, with a roofline that has three large gables on the (east-facing) front and two on the south. These gables are all decorated with Tudor Revival half-timbering, vergeboard in the eaves, and finials at the peaks. The central gable on the front has an arch at its center, with a balcony projecting over the building's front entrance. On the ground floor there are two storefronts.

The building was constructed in 1902 by Wilson and Ralph Hawkes, a father-son pair the elder of whom had operated a pharmacy in York Beach since 1899. The building initially housed the pharmacy in one storefront, and a dry goods store in the other, with the proprietor living upstairs. Ralph Hawkes continued to operate the pharmacy until the 1940s, when a fire extensively damaged the interior. The building was rehabilitated in the 1900s, with the upstairs converted into small hotel. The building is the only known non-residential design of architect Fred Watson, who moved to York Beach from New York City in 1899.

== See also ==
- National Register of Historic Places listings in York County, Maine
