= Woods Hole (passage) =

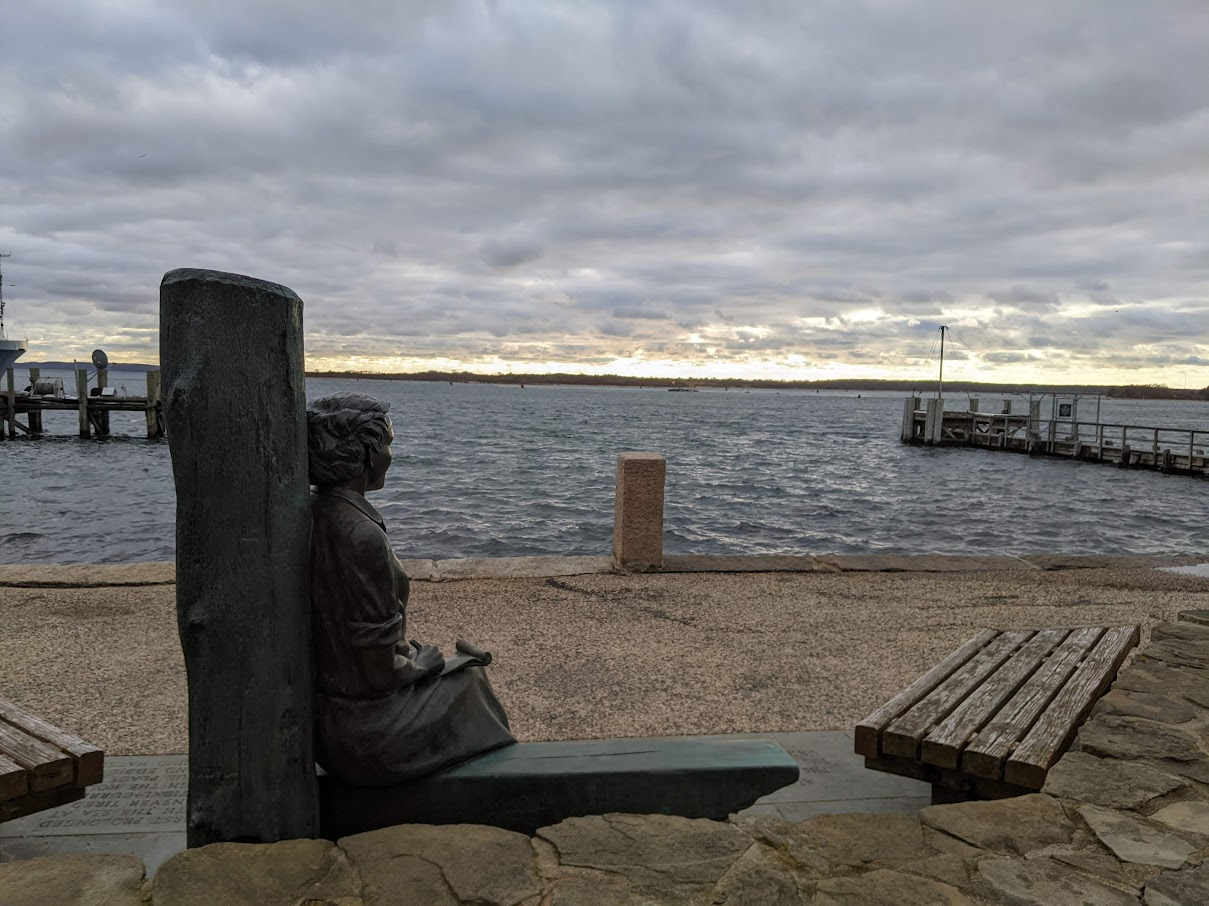
- Statue of Rachel Carson looking out towards the passage

- Location of Woods Hole within Massachusetts Woods Hole (the United States)
- Coordinates: 41.5167755°N 70.6828079°W
- Part of: Atlantic Ocean

Woods Hole is a strait in Massachusetts separating the Elizabeth Islands from the village of Woods Hole on the mainland of Cape Cod. It is one of four straits allowing maritime passage between Buzzards Bay and Vineyard Sound. The others are Canapitsit Channel, Robinson's Hole and Quick's Hole. Woods Hole is often referred to as Woods Hole Passage to distinguish it from the village of Woods Hole, which is itself named after the passage.

Woods Hole is a naturally occurring, rocky, and treacherous passage, with shallow rocky areas scattered along both sides of the channel. The current is often strong running between Buzzards Bay and Vineyard Sound, mostly flowing at around 4 knots and occasionally as fast as 7 knots. The eastern (Vineyard Sound) side of the channel also splits into a southern branch, known as Broadway, which flows closer to Nonamesset Island.

== Etymology ==
The origin of the strait's name is unknown. Several similar straits in the area are also referred to as "holes", but this term is not used in the U.S. outside of the Cape and Islands. The source of "Woods" is also hazy but is believed to have been derived from the possessive form of the name of a Wampanoag living in the area during English colonization of Cape Cod in the 17th century. There is a possibility that Woods Hole was named after a colonist, but it is unlikely to have been a reference to woods, in the sense of a forest.
