= Paul D. McGowan =

American politician

Paul McGowan

Member of the Maine House of Representatives for the 149th District
- In office December 2012 – July 28, 2014
- Preceded by: Bradley Moulton
- Succeeded by: Carol McElwee

Personal details
- Born: April 8, 1947 North Attleboro, Massachusetts
- Died: July 28, 2014 (aged 67) Cape Neddick, Maine
- Party: Democratic
- Spouse: Shirley Ann Huckins McGowan
- Education: Providence College

Paul Donald McGowan (April 8, 1947 – July 28, 2014) was an American politician from Maine. A Democrat, McGowan was elected to the Maine House of Representatives in 2012, replacing Bradley Moulton. He lived in the Cape Neddick neighborhood of York, Maine. In the Maine Legislature, McGowan was a member of the Environment and Natural Resources Committee and helped pass a signature cancer-related bill during his only term.

McGowan grew up in North Attleboro, Massachusetts, with his parents and 5 brothers and sisters. He graduated from Providence College. McGowan killed himself after a history of depression on July 28, 2014. He was not seeking re-election.
