= Woods Hole Conference =

The Woods Hole Conference was held at Woods Hole, Massachusetts as a response to the Soviet Union's launch of the Sputnik series of satellites, in 1959 to identify the problems of science education and to recommend solutions. Woods Hole was held because American educators feared that the Soviet Union was surpassing the United States in educational emphasis on science, math, and foreign languages.

The conference marked the beginning of a new trend in educational planning: the unified efforts of distinguished people in varied fields addressing themselves to the general improvement of education. The result was discipline-based education and conceptual learning.

== Impact on music education ==
Music was categorized as aesthetic education. In a 1959 article in The Music Educators Journal, Alberta Lowe and Harold S. Pryor argued that the Soviet Union was also placing considerable emphasis on music education. As a result of Woods Hole, music educators resolved to teach music as an entire discipline that includes concepts, skills, and repertoire.

== Impact on mathematics and science education ==
New math was also a result as well as the spiral curriculum—-learning about and using basic concepts that would be revisited at subsequent levels. Jerome Bruner is an educational psychologist associated with this conference and with the spiral curriculum. The textbook revolution was another result of Woods Hole.
