= Robinson's Hole =

Strait in Massachusetts

- Location of Robinson's Hole within Massachusetts Robinson's Hole (the United States)
- Coordinates: 41.4501089°N 70.8078094°W
- Part of: Atlantic Ocean

Robinson's Hole is the strait in Massachusetts' Elizabeth Islands separating Naushon Island from Pasque Island. It is one of four straits allowing maritime passage between Buzzards Bay and the Vineyard Sound. The others are Canapitsit Channel, Quick's Hole and Woods Hole. Robinson's Hole is located in the town of Gosnold.
