= Woods Hole School =

- U.S. National Register of Historic Places
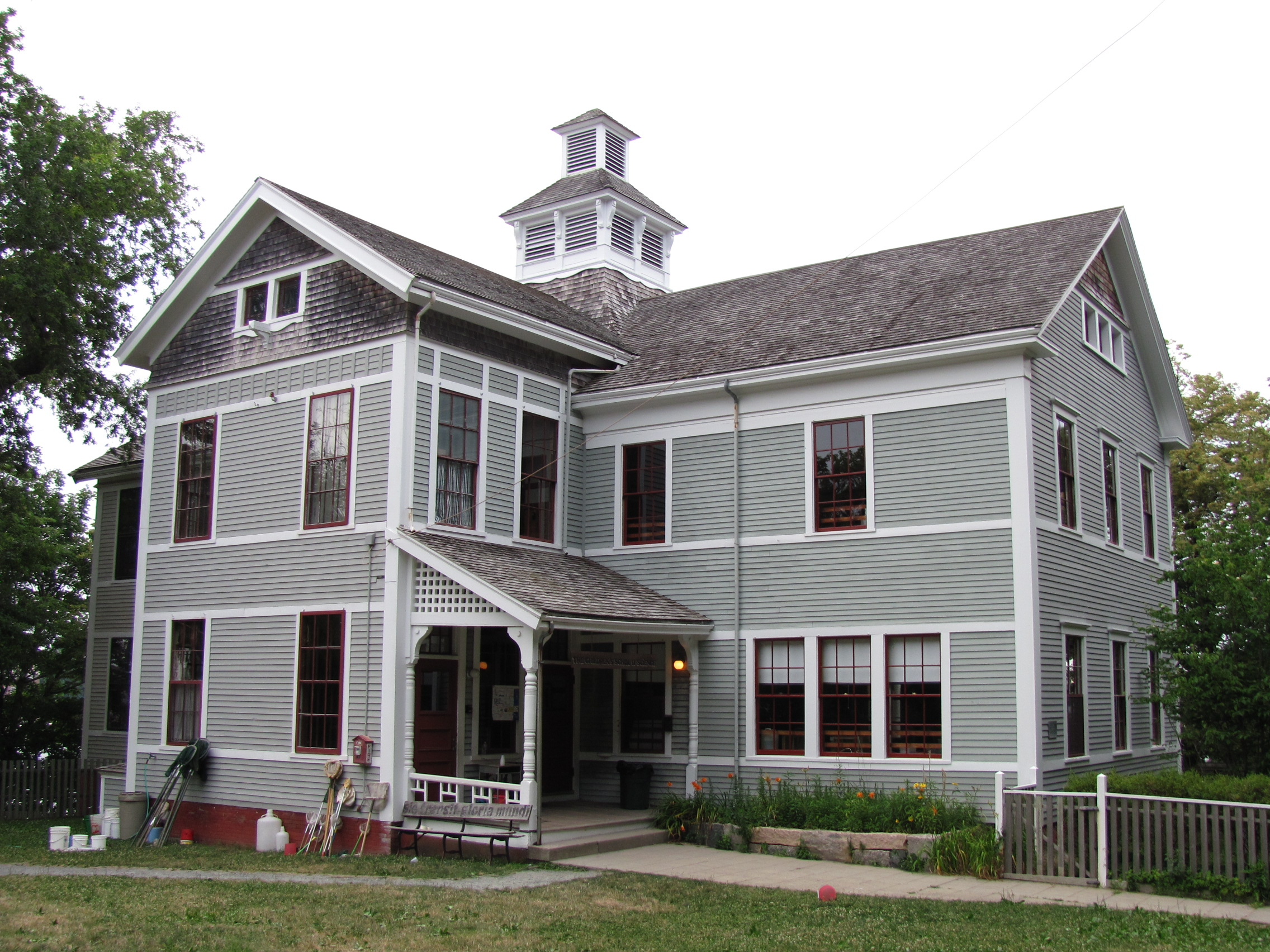
- Woods Hole School

- Location within Cape Cod Location within Massachusetts Location within the United States
- Location: Woods Hole, Massachusetts
- Coordinates: 41°31′29″N 70°40′10″W
- Built: 1870; 1885
- Built by: Mead, Mason & Company (1885)
- Architect: Samuel D. Kelley (1885)
- Architectural style: Stick/Eastlake, Italianate, Queen Anne
- NRHP reference No.: 82000473
- Added to NRHP: October 21, 1982

The Woods Hole School is a historic school building at 24 School Street in Woods Hole, Massachusetts, United States within the town of Falmouth, Massachusetts. The school was listed on the National Register of Historic Places in 1982. It is a two-story wood-frame structure, with a gable roof capped by a two-stage cupola with belfry. A gabled two-story section projects to the front, with a shed-roof porch sheltering the entry to its side. It has trim bands extending around the building at the tops and bottoms of its windows. The building, the second school built on the site, was built as a two-room structure in 1870, and enlarged to four classrooms in 1885. The architect for the expansion was Samuel D. Kelley and the contractor was Mead, Mason & Company of Concord, New Hampshire.

In the summer, the Woods Hole School is the home of the Children's School of Science. In the winter, the Woods Hole School is the home of the Woods Hole Daycare Cooperative.

== See also ==
- National Register of Historic Places listings in Barnstable County, Massachusetts
