= Quick's Hole =

Strait in Massachusetts, United States

- Location of Quick's Hole within Massachusetts Quick's Hole (the United States)
- Coordinates: 41.4417752°N 70.8453105°W
- Part of: Atlantic Ocean

Quick's Hole (locally /ˈkwɪksɪz/) is the strait in Massachusetts' Elizabeth Islands separating Nashawena Island from Pasque Island. It is one of four straits allowing maritime passage between Buzzards Bay and the Vineyard Sound. The others are Canapitsit Channel, Robinson's Hole and Woods Hole.

A narrow passage, Quick's Hole handles heavy boat traffic as the only passage between Vineyard Sound and Buzzards Bay suitable for vessels with drafts greater than 10 feet. Analysis of the data revealed giant sand waves, huge glacial erratic boulders and several uncharted wrecks. Quick's Hole, due north of Menemsha on Martha's Vineyard and due south of New Bedford, extends about one and one-half miles from north to south; it is three-quarters of a mile across at its widest point.
