= York Beach, Maine =

- Area within New England town
- Location within the state of Maine
- Coordinates: 43°10′31″N 70°36′38″W
- Country: United States
- State: Maine
- County: York
- Elevation: 20 ft (6.1 m)
- Time zone: UTC-5 (Eastern (EST))
  - Summer (DST): UTC-4 (EDT)
- ZIP code: 03910

York Beach is a community within the town of York, Maine, United States. The York Beach area consists of Long Sands and Short Sands beaches on the Atlantic Ocean in the Gulf of Maine. The two beaches are separated by Cape Neddick. York Beach and Cape Neddick together comprise the Cape Neddick census-designated place, with a year-round population of 2,568 as of the 2010 census. The town of York consists of the communities of York Beach, Cape Neddick, York Harbor, and the village of York. The town is home to 12,529 residents, though rising to an estimated 52,000 during the summer months.

The 1992 American romantic comedy film Bed & Breakfast was filmed and set in York Beach.

== Beaches ==
There are two main beaches which make up the York Beach area.

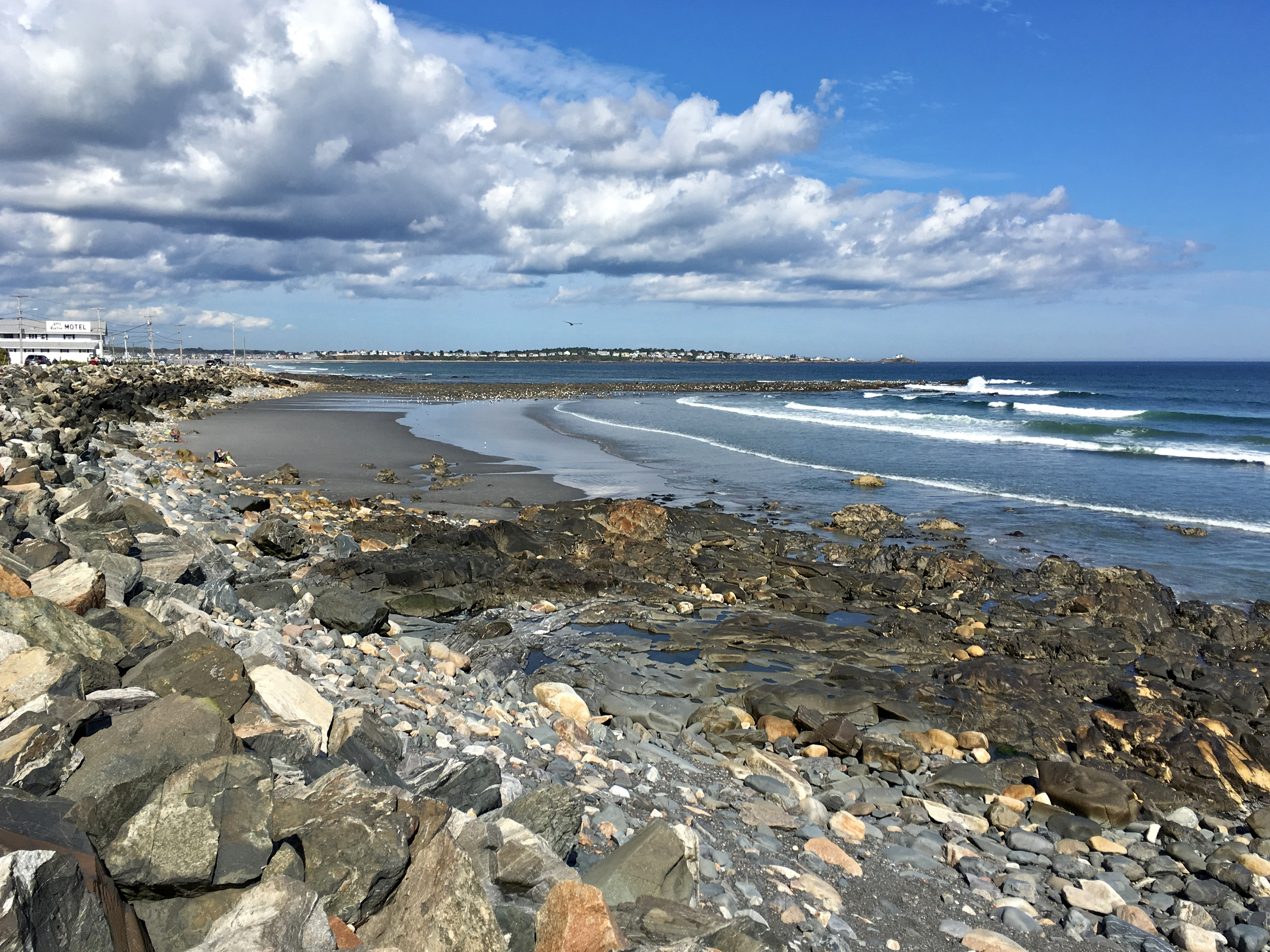
Long Sands Beach

Long Sands Beach: Long Sands Beach extends for 1.3 miles (2.1 km).

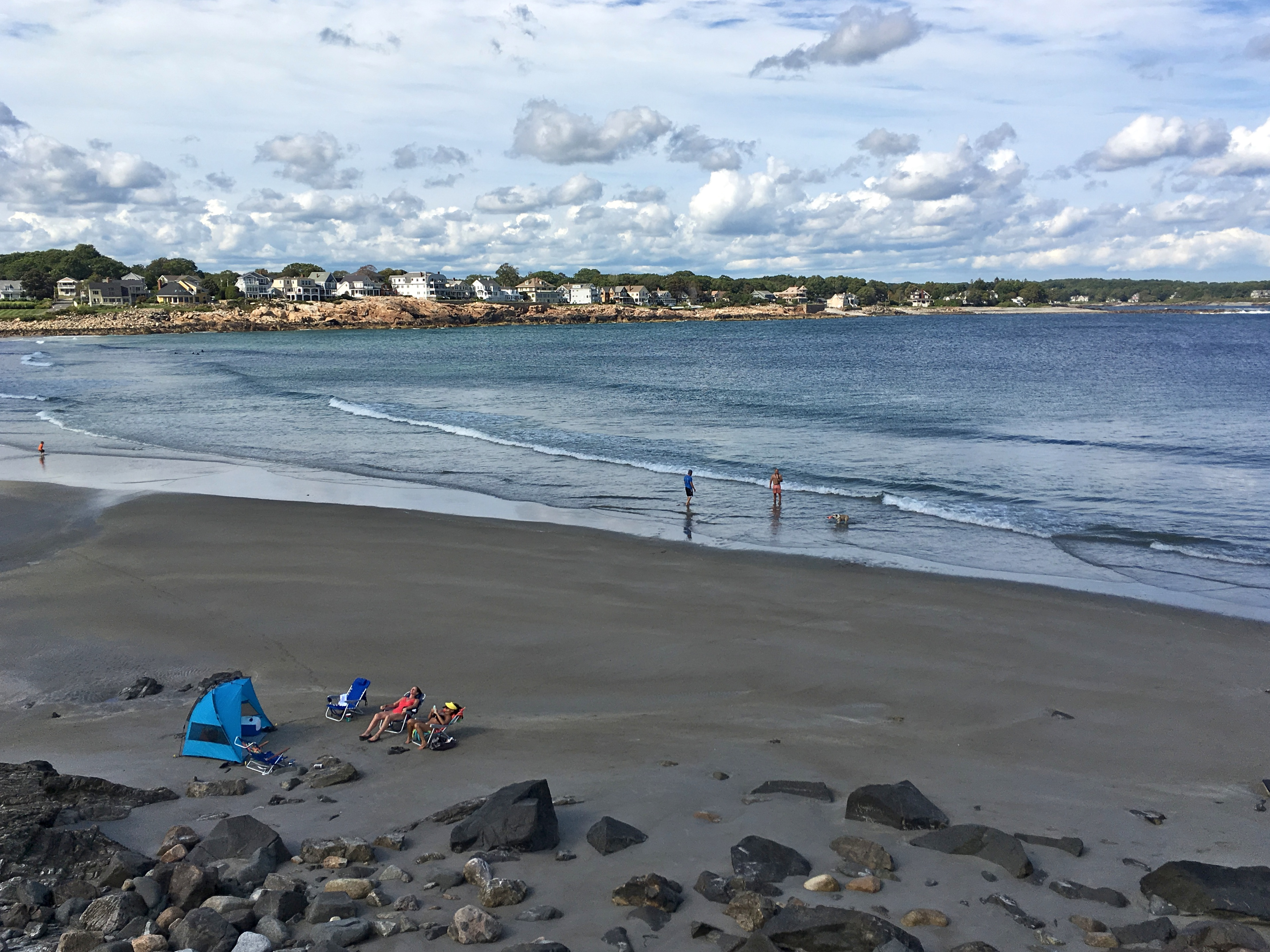
Short Sands Beach

Short Sands Beach: Located on the north side of Cape Neddick, Short Sands Beach is home of Cape Neddick Light, locally known as "Nubble Light." The much shorter of the two beaches, with a more densely developed downtown area with several historical and commercial properties. The area has many arcades, shops, restaurants, and nightlife.

== Special events ==
York Days is an annual event that takes place around the downtown York Beach area. York Days takes place on a weekend in early August every year. Events include a craft fair, a softball tournament, and a large fireworks display on the last Sunday of the weekend.

Lighting of the Nubble: The Nubble Light is lit up twice a year with Christmas lights. The first time is known as "Christmas in July," and takes place around July 25 every year. The second is the "Annual Lighting of the Nubble," which takes place in December to honor the actual holiday season.

== Locations of interest ==
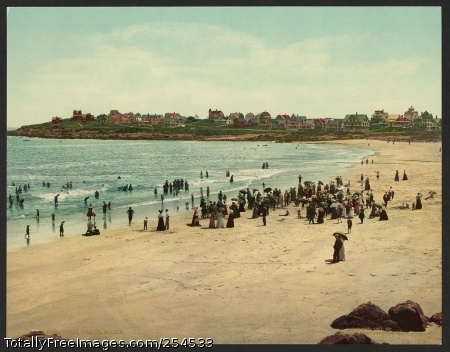
York Beach ~ 1901

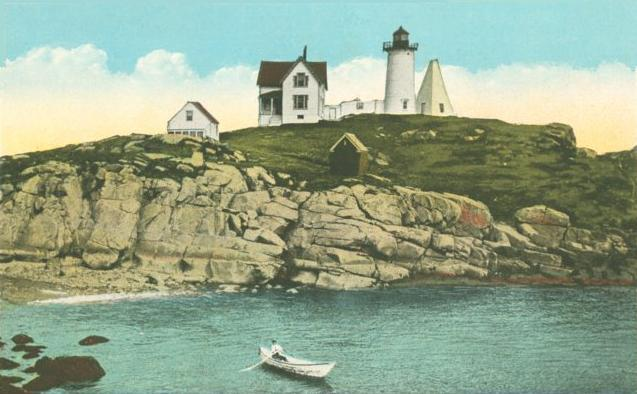
Cape Neddick Light c. 1920

Cape Neddick Light, also known as Nubble Lighthouse, is located on Short Sands Beach and stands 41 feet (12 m) tall. Construction began in 1876 and cost $15,000. It was first illuminated on July 1, 1879. The lighthouse was originally red, but was painted white in 1902, when the red keeper's house was built. The lighthouse became automated in 1987.

Goldenrod was established by Edward and Mattie Talpey in 1896 at the very location where it stands today.

Union Bluff Hotel: is a historic hotel originally built on the Union Bluffs in 1875 by Moses French. The area around the hotel greatly expanded due to tourism in the late 1870s, and the hotel provided an ideal lodging option for the increasing number of tourists visiting the area. The original Union Bluff Hotel was one of the oldest wooden buildings in York Beach until the original building was destroyed by fire in 1987. It was rebuilt in just two years, in 1989, and has been the same ever since. The hotel underwent multiple name changes, including: The Wahnita (c. 1900s), The York Plaza Hotel (c. 1930s), and The Union Bluff Hotel (c. 1976).

== Government ==
York Beach resides within the town of York, which has a council-manager form of government.
