= Jane's Island =

Children's Novel

- Author: Marjorie Hill Allee
- Illustrator: Maitland de Gorgoza
- Language: English
- Genre: Children's literature
- Publisher: Houghton
- Publication date: 1931
- Publication place: United States

Jane's Island is a 1930 children's novel written by Marjorie Hill Allee and illustrated by Maitland de Gorgoza. College freshman Ellen McNeill is excited at the prospect of spending the summer in Woods Hole, Massachusetts accompanying Jane Thomas, daughter of the head biologist at the Woods Hole marine laboratory. She meets many scientists and research assistants at the lab, including Drs. Bergen and Thomas. Dr. Bergen is working to disprove Dr. Thomas' planaria research findings. During a beach party, Dr. Bergen is caught in a riptide, and Jane and Ellen swim out to rescue him. Unappreciative of the girl's rescue attempt, he is forced to rescue them after the girls find themself stranded on an island after a fog rolls in. Dr. Thomas falls sick, and Dr. Bergen takes over his planaria research and proves Dr. Thomas' conclusions correct. The book was a Newbery Honor recipient in 1932.
