= Canapitsit Channel =

- Location of Canapitsit Channel within Massachusetts Canapitsit Channel (the United States)
- Coordinates: 41°25′24″N 70°54′28″W
- Part of: Atlantic Ocean

Canapitsit Channel is a channel that runs from Cuttyhunk Harbor to the Vineyard Sound and separates Nashawena Island from Cuttyhunk Island, two of the Elizabeth Islands off Cape Cod, Massachusetts. It is one of four straits allowing maritime passage between Buzzards Bay and the Vineyard Sound. The others are Quick's Hole, Robinson's Hole and Woods Hole. Canapitsit is an Indian word meaning "current passage".

Strong tidal currents (up to 6 knots) separate the islands from each other. The currents are driven by the different sizes and filling rates of Vineyard Sound to the southeast and Buzzards Bay to the northwest.

One Cuttyhunk Island website offers the following boating advisory:

DO NOT use Canapitsit Channel, which separates Cuttyhunk from Nashawena Island, without local knowledge. The channel is narrow, rocky and subject to strong currents making the passage dangerous.
