= Marjorie Hill Allee =

American author

- Born: June 2, 1890; Carthage, Indiana, U.S.
- Died: April 30, 1945 (aged 54); Albert Merritt Billings Hospital, Chicago, Illinois, U.S.
- Education: Earlham College; University of Chicago (Ph.B.)
- Spouse: Warder Clyde Allee (m. 1912)
- Children: 2
- Writing career
- Language: English
- Genres: Fiction, non-fiction, science, history
- Notable awards: Newbery Honor (1932); Josette Frank Award (1944)

Marjorie Allee (née Hill; born June 2, 1890, in Carthage, Indiana – died April 30, 1945, in Chicago) was an American author.

== Early life ==
She was born in Carthage, Indiana to William B. Hill and Anna (Elliott) Hill and grew up on a farm in a Quaker community.

After attending Earlham College, she returned to teach in the one-room school she had attended herself. The next year, she attended the University of Chicago, intending to become a writer, and graduated in 1911 with a Ph.B. In 1912, she married zoologist Warder Clyde Allee. Throughout his career, she would assist Allee in the preparation of his scientific publications, occasionally serving as co-author.

== Career ==
Her first book, a collaboration with Warder Allee, was Jungle Island (1925), a nonfiction children's book describing the flora and fauna of Barro Colorado Island in the Panama Canal inspired by their stay at the Barro Colorado Island Laboratory in the winter of 1924.

Other, similarly themed books by Allee were Jane's Island (1931), a novel about scientific exploration at Woods Hole, Massachusetts which was a Newbery Honor book, and Ann's Surprising Summer (1933), a novel about biologists working to preserve the dune country of northern Indiana.

Allee wrote six historical novels about Quaker families confronting the changes of mid-19th century America. Three of them, Judith Lankester (1930), A House of Her Own (1934), and Off to Philadelphia (1936), were about the struggles of the widow Charity Lankester and her eight daughters. More contemporary works by Allen include The Great Tradition (1937), a novel about women studying in a biology laboratory at the University of Chicago which was a serious contrast with the frivolous activities usually depicted in college novels, and The House (1944), a work about relationships between people of different ages, races, and social backgrounds which received the Children's Book Award (now the Josette Frank Award) from the Child Study Association of America.

== Bibliography ==
- Jungle Island (1925) with Warder Clyde Allee
- Susanna and Tristam (1929)
- Judith Lankester (1930)
- Jane's Island (1931)
- The Road to Carolina (1932)
- Ann's Surprising Summer (1933)
- A House of Her Own (1934)
- Off to Philadelphia (1936)
- The Great Tradition (1937)
- The Little American Girl (1938)
- Runaway Linda (1939)
- The Camp at Westlands (1941)
- Winter's Mischief (1942)
- The House (1944)
- Smoke Jumper (1945)
