= Cape Neddick, Maine =

- Census-designated place
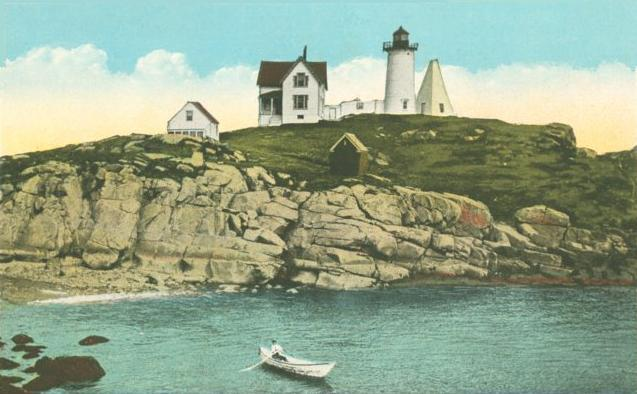
- Cape Neddick Light c. 1920

- Location within Maine Location within the United States
- Coordinates: 43°10′04″N 70°37′36″W
- Country: United States
- State: Maine
- County: York

Area
  - Total: 3.97 sq mi (10.27 km^{2})
  - Land: 3.73 sq mi (9.66 km^{2})
  - Water: 0.24 sq mi (0.61 km^{2})
- Elevation: 26 ft (7.9 m)

Population (2020)
  - Total: 3,037
  - Density: 814.0/sq mi (314.28/km^{2})
- Time zone: UTC-5 (Eastern (EST))
  - Summer (DST): UTC-4 (EDT)
- ZIP Codes: 03902 (Cape Neddick); 03910 (York Beach); 03909 (York)
- Area code: 207
- FIPS code: 23-10320
- GNIS feature ID: 2377897

Cape Neddick is a census-designated place (CDP) in the town of York in York County, Maine, United States. As of the 2020 census, Cape Neddick had a population of 3,037. It is part of the Portland–South Portland–Biddeford, Maine Metropolitan Statistical Area.

== Geography ==
The CDP as defined includes all of the physical peninsula known as Cape Neddick, plus all of the unincorporated community of York Beach, which consists of two beaches, one on either side of Cape Neddick. The northern limit of the CDP is Cape Neddick Harbor, the western limit is Route 1, and the southern boundary is the border with York Harbor. According to the United States Census Bureau, the CDP has a total area of 4.0 square miles (10 km^{2}), of which 3.7 square miles (9.6 km^{2}) is land and 0.2 square miles (0.52 km^{2}) of it, or 6.03%, is water.

Cape Neddick Light, also known as Nubble Lighthouse, is the most distinctive feature of the community. Construction began in 1876 and cost $15,000. It was first illuminated on July 1, 1879. The lighthouse was originally red but has been painted white since 1902. The distinctive red house was also built in 1902. The tower stands 41 feet (12 m) tall. The lighthouse became automated in 1987.

=== Climate ===
Cape Neddick has a humid continental climate (Köppen Dfb), its main features are long cold winters and sometimes hot summers. Affected by the Gulf of Maine, winters are not so severe compared to other parts of Maine. Since the weather station was established and began to observe in 2000, it has never measured a low temperature below −20 °F (−29 °C). Cape Neddick's annual average temperature is 47.0 °F (8.3 °C), the coldest month is 23.2 °F (−4.9 °C) in January, and the hottest month is 69.7 °F (20.9 °C) in July.

Extreme temperatures range from −14 °F (−26 °C) on February 15–16, 2003 up to 98 °F (37 °C) on June 25, 2025; the record cold daily maximum is 0 °F (−18 °C), set on January 15, 2004, while, conversely, the record warm daily minimum is 77 °F (25 °C) on June 29, 2021. The coldest day of the year averaged 11 °F (−12 °C) in the 2001 to 2020 normals, while the warmest night average was at 70 °F (21 °C). The coldest has been February 2015 with a mean temperature of 12.2 °F (−11.0 °C), while the warmest month was July 2024 at 73.2 °F (22.9 °C); the annual mean temperature has ranged from 45.8 °F (7.7 °C) in 2014 to 49.0 °F (9.4 °C) in 2010. Cape Neddick has about 2 days a year with afternoon temperatures above 90 °F (32 °C), and 7 days a year with nighttime temperatures below 0 °F (−18 °C).

Climate data for Cape Neddick, Maine (1991–2020 normals, extremes 2000–present)
Month	Jan	Feb	Mar	Apr	May	Jun	Jul	Aug	Sep	Oct	Nov	Dec	Year
Record high °F (°C)	64 (18)	66 (19)	84 (29)	94 (34)	95 (35)	98 (37)	97 (36)	95 (35)	94 (34)	80 (27)	78 (26)	70 (21)	98 (37)
Mean maximum °F (°C)	50.1 (10.1)	51.7 (10.9)	61.9 (16.6)	71.7 (22.1)	84.9 (29.4)	87.6 (30.9)	89.9 (32.2)	87.4 (30.8)	83.7 (28.7)	72.5 (22.5)	65.3 (18.5)	54.9 (12.7)	91.7 (33.2)
Mean daily maximum °F (°C)	32.0 (0.0)	34.9 (1.6)	42.4 (5.8)	55.6 (13.1)	65.5 (18.6)	73.6 (23.1)	78.9 (26.1)	78.7 (25.9)	71.0 (21.7)	59.4 (15.2)	48.2 (9.0)	37.9 (3.3)	56.5 (13.6)
Daily mean °F (°C)	23.2 (−4.9)	25.4 (−3.7)	33.0 (0.6)	44.6 (7.0)	54.9 (12.7)	64.1 (17.8)	69.7 (20.9)	69.0 (20.6)	61.2 (16.2)	49.6 (9.8)	39.4 (4.1)	29.4 (−1.4)	47.0 (8.3)
Mean daily minimum °F (°C)	14.4 (−9.8)	15.9 (−8.9)	23.5 (−4.7)	33.6 (0.9)	44.2 (6.8)	54.5 (12.5)	60.5 (15.8)	59.2 (15.1)	51.4 (10.8)	39.8 (4.3)	30.5 (−0.8)	20.8 (−6.2)	37.4 (3.0)
Mean minimum °F (°C)	−3.9 (−19.9)	−0.8 (−18.2)	5.2 (−14.9)	24.3 (−4.3)	33.0 (0.6)	44.2 (6.8)	52.1 (11.2)	49.7 (9.8)	38.3 (3.5)	29.2 (−1.6)	18.1 (−7.7)	5.7 (−14.6)	−6.7 (−21.5)
Record low °F (°C)	−13 (−25)	−14 (−26)	−4 (−20)	15 (−9)	29 (−2)	38 (3)	45 (7)	44 (7)	33 (1)	21 (−6)	5 (−15)	−11 (−24)	−14 (−26)
Average precipitation inches (mm)	3.61 (92)	3.64 (92)	4.92 (125)	4.78 (121)	3.93 (100)	4.46 (113)	3.80 (97)	3.60 (91)	4.30 (109)	5.35 (136)	4.30 (109)	4.93 (125)	51.62 (1,311)
Average snowfall inches (cm)	18.5 (47)	20.1 (51)	11.6 (29)	2.4 (6.1)	0.0 (0.0)	0.0 (0.0)	0.0 (0.0)	0.0 (0.0)	0.0 (0.0)	0.0 (0.0)	1.5 (3.8)	16.0 (41)	70.1 (178)
Average extreme snow depth inches (cm)	12.3 (31)	17.9 (45)	15.3 (39)	5.1 (13)	0.0 (0.0)	0.0 (0.0)	0.0 (0.0)	0.0 (0.0)	0.0 (0.0)	0.4 (1.0)	1.4 (3.6)	9.5 (24)	21.1 (54)
Average precipitation days (≥ 0.01 in)	10.6	9.2	10.3	11.4	11.3	12.0	9.6	8.7	7.6	10.2	10.4	11.9	123.2
Average snowy days (≥ 0.1 in)	7.4	6.3	3.9	1.4	0.0	0.0	0.0	0.0	0.0	0.1	1.1	5.8	26.0
Source: NOAA (mean maxima/minima, snow depth 2006–2020)

== Demographics ==
Historical population
Census	Pop.	Note	%±
2010	2,568		—
2020	3,037		18.3%
U.S. Decennial Census

=== 2020 census ===
As of the 2020 census, Cape Neddick had a population of 3,037. The median age was 58.6 years. 12.1% of residents were under the age of 18 and 36.8% of residents were 65 years of age or older. For every 100 females there were 89.7 males, and for every 100 females age 18 and over there were 85.0 males age 18 and over.

100.0% of residents lived in urban areas, while 0.0% lived in rural areas.

There were 1,515 households in Cape Neddick, of which 17.8% had children under the age of 18 living in them. Of all households, 51.9% were married-couple households, 12.5% were households with a male householder and no spouse or partner present, and 28.4% were households with a female householder and no spouse or partner present. About 29.8% of all households were made up of individuals and 18.0% had someone living alone who was 65 years of age or older.

There were 3,632 housing units, of which 58.3% were vacant. The homeowner vacancy rate was 0.3% and the rental vacancy rate was 16.5%.

Racial composition as of the 2020 census
Race	Number	Percent
White	2,855	94.0%
Black or African American	10	0.3%
American Indian and Alaska Native	5	0.2%
Asian	32	1.1%
Native Hawaiian and Other Pacific Islander	0	0.0%
Some other race	17	0.6%
Two or more races	118	3.9%
Hispanic or Latino (of any race)	68	2.2%

=== 2000 census ===
As of the census of 2000, there were 2,997 people, 1,340 households, and 897 families residing in the CDP. The population density was 801.5 inhabitants per square mile (309.5/km^{2}). There were 3,424 housing units at an average density of 915.7 per square mile (353.6/km^{2}). The racial makeup of the CDP was 98.26% White, 0.27% African American, 0.47% Asian, 0.10% Pacific Islander, 0.20% from other races, and 0.70% from two or more races. Hispanic or Latino of any race were 0.90% of the population.

There were 1,340 households, out of which 22.3% had children under the age of 18 living with them, 55.7% were married couples living together, 8.2% had a female householder with no husband present, and 33.0% were non-families. 27.2% of all households were made up of individuals, and 11.2% had someone living alone who was 65 years of age or older. The average household size was 2.24 and the average family size was 2.70.

In the CDP, the population was spread out, with 18.2% under the age of 18, 4.4% from 18 to 24, 23.9% from 25 to 44, 33.9% from 45 to 64, and 19.6% who were 65 years of age or older. The median age was 47 years. For every 100 females, there were 88.4 males. For every 100 females age 18 and over, there were 86.7 males.

The median income for a household in the CDP was $45,500, and the median income for a family was $52,796. Males had a median income of $42,386 versus $30,800 for females. The per capita income for the CDP was $33,788. About 2.2% of families and 5.6% of the population were below the poverty line, including 4.6% of those under age 18 and 5.2% of those age 65 or over.

== Points of interest ==
There are two listings on the National Register of Historic Places for Cape Neddick. One is St. Peter's By-The-Sea Protestant Episcopal Church, and the other is Cape Neddick Light just off the coast.

== History ==
Before 1655 Cape Neddick was inhabited by John Gooch, Peter Weare, Edward Wanton, Sylvester Stover and Thomas Wheelwright and their families.

=== Voyager spacecraft ===
A photo of Cape Neddick is included on the Voyager Golden Record, currently drifting ancross interstellar space aboard the Voyager 1 and Voyager 2 spacecraft. The photo was selected as an example of the diversity of life and culture on Earth.

== Notable residents ==
- Phyllis Brooks, actress
- Peter Clines, writer
- Dawn Hill, state legislator
- Paul D. McGowan, state legislator
