= Cape Neddick Light =

Lighthouse in Maine, US

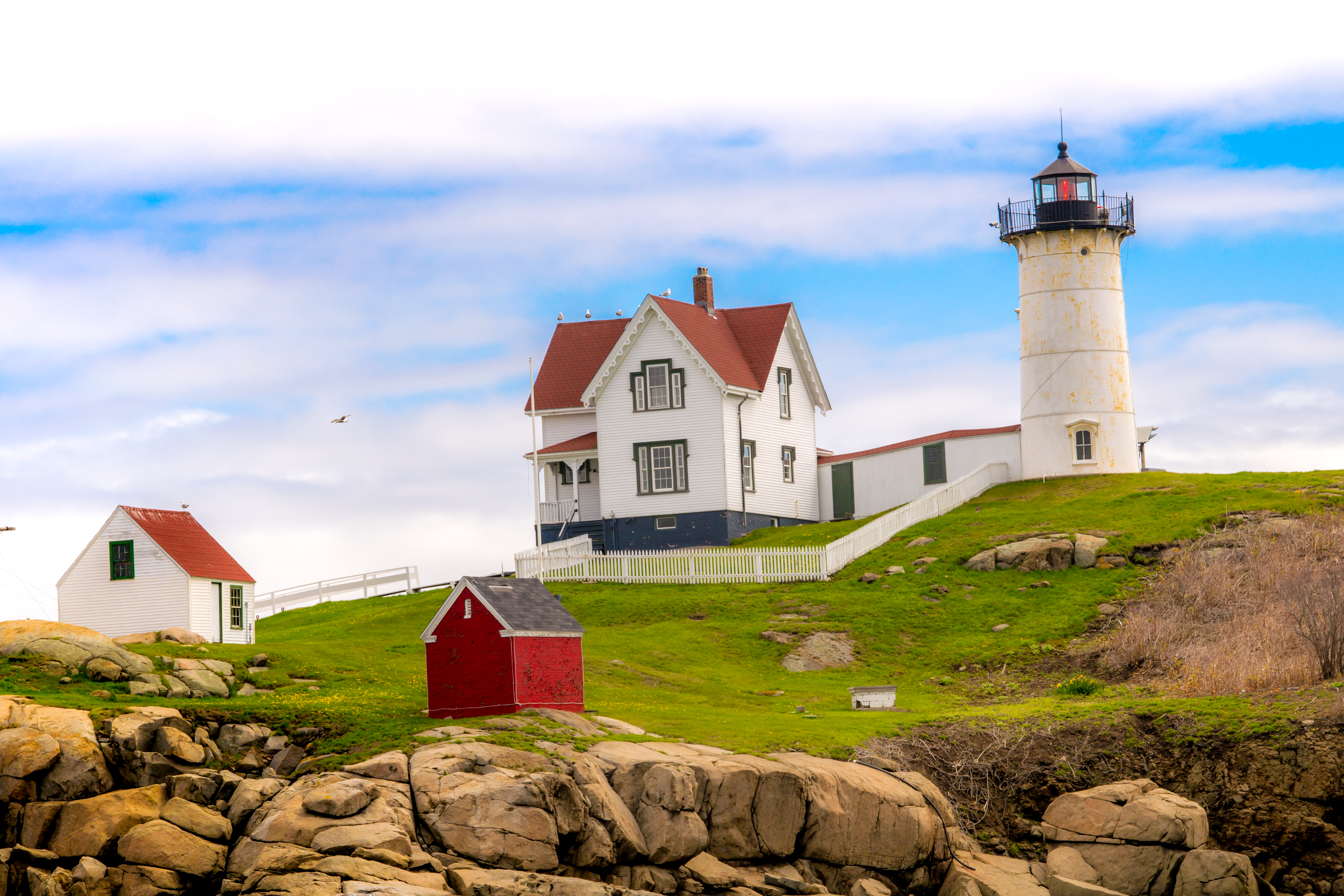
- The Cape Neddick Light in 2017
- Location: Cape Neddick, Maine
- Coordinates: 43°9′54.733″N 70°35′27.943″W

Tower
- Constructed: 1879
- Foundation: Concrete
- Construction: Cast iron plate with brick lining
- Automated: 1987
- Height: 12.5 m (41 ft)
- Shape: Cylindrical
- Markings: White with black lantern
- Heritage: National Register of Historic Places listed place
- Fog signal: HORN: 1 every 10s

Light
- Focal height: 88 ft (27 m)
- Lens: Fourth order Fresnel
- Range: 13 nautical miles (24 km; 15 mi)
- Characteristic: Isophase Red 5s. Lighted throughout 24 hours.
- Cape Neddick Light Station
- U.S. National Register of Historic Places
- Location: Cape Neddick, York, Maine
- NRHP reference No.: 85000844
- Added to NRHP: April 16, 1985

The Cape Neddick Light is a lighthouse in Cape Neddick, York, Maine. In 1874 Congress appropriated $15,000 to build a light station at the "Nubble" and in 1879 construction began. Cape Neddick Light Station was dedicated by the U.S. Lighthouse Service and put into use in 1879. It is still in use today.

Plans had been in the works to build a lighthouse on the site since 1837. The tower is lined with brick and sheathed with cast iron. It stands 41 feet (12 m) tall but the light is 88 feet (27 m) above sea level because of the additional height of the steep rocky islet on which it sits. Unusually, the stanchions of the walkway railing around the lantern room are decorated with 4-inch (100 mm) brass replicas of the lighthouse itself.

== Location ==
The Cape Neddick Light stands on Nubble Island about 100 yards (91 m) off Cape Neddick Point. It is commonly known as "Nubble Light" or simply "the Nubble".

Cape Neddick Point is at the north end of Long Sands Beach in the village of York Beach. The lighthouse is inaccessible to the general public, but the nearby mainland is occupied by Sohier Park which offers many locations from which to view the lighthouse and a gift shop with a "Nubble" theme.

== Significance ==
Nubble Light is a famous American icon and a classic example of a lighthouse. An image of the lighthouse is included on the Voyager Golden Record carried by the Voyager spacecraft as one of Earth's most prominent man-made structures or natural features, alongside features such as the Great Wall of China and the Taj Mahal, to be viewed should it fall into the hands of intelligent extraterrestrials.

Cape Neddick Light is one of the last seven lights in Maine to still have its Fresnel lens. It was added to the National Register of Historic Places as Cape Neddick Light Station on April 16, 1985, reference number 85000844.

The lighthouse and island were featured in the movie Lost Boundaries (1949) starring Mel Ferrer.

== Speculative history ==
Although the origin of the little lighthouse adornments is unknown, there are many other stories about the Nubble Light. Among them is the story of the keeper and his wife who, in 1912, decided to take advantage of the booming tourist business at the York beaches. They developed a lively business ferrying tourists across to the island and giving tours. The trade grew so lively that the light was neglected and the keeper fired. Another keeper lived on the island with his 19-pound (8.6 kg) cat who was an attraction in himself, especially when he reputedly swam across the channel to visit mainland friends. It is not always summer, though, and another story lends balance to lighthouse living. The Nubble is such a windy spot that in the winter, the temperature dropped so low that the flow of lamp oil to the incandescent oil vapor lamp was impeded. The problem was solved in 1938 when the lamp was electrified. That same year, the outhouse was closed, and the keeper and his family also received indoor plumbing.

== See also ==
- Nobska Light, a similar lighthouse on Cape Cod, constructed in 1876.
- Portsmouth Harbor Light, a similar lighthouse in New Hampshire, constructed in 1878.
- National Register of Historic Places listings in York County, Maine
