= Vineyard Sound =

Strait adjacent to Martha's Vineyard, U.S.

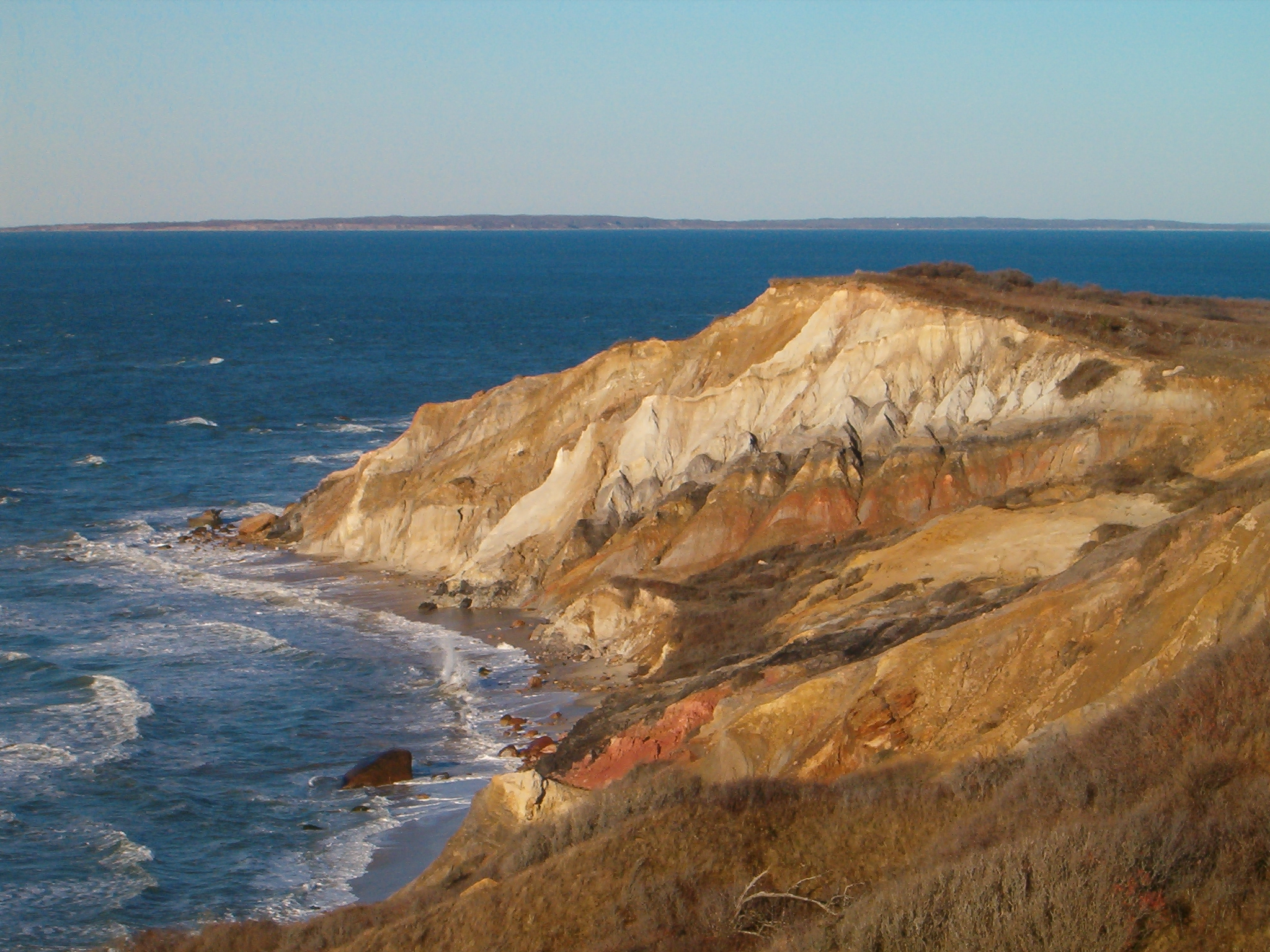
- Vineyard Sound is the body of water located behind the Gay Head Cliffs of Martha's Vineyard.

- Location of Vineyard Sound within Massachusetts Vineyard Sound (the United States)
- Coordinates: 41°26′30″N 70°46′28″W, 41°28′45″N 70°39′59″W, 41°23′59″N 70°53′43″W, 41°21′45″N 70°47′48″W, 41°32′35″N 70°28′56″W, 41°31′47″N 70°33′43″W
- Part of: Atlantic Ocean

Vineyard Sound is the stretch of the Atlantic Ocean which separates the Elizabeth Islands and the southwestern part of Cape Cod from the island of Martha's Vineyard, located offshore from the state of Massachusetts in the United States. To the west, it joins Rhode Island Sound, and on its eastern end it connects to Nantucket Sound.

Vineyard Sound holds some of the largest summer flounder in Massachusetts.
