= Harbor Defenses of New Bedford =

Coordinates: 41°35′35″N 70°54′05″W

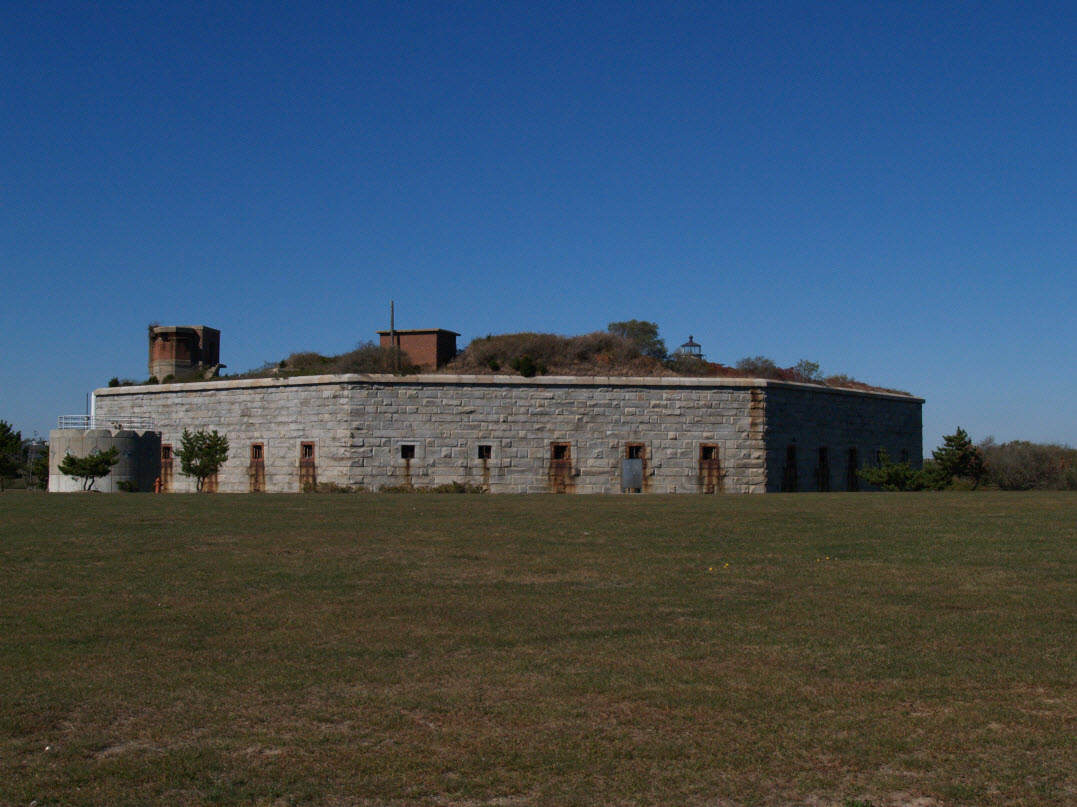
- Fort Rodman
- Active: 1900-1950
- Country: United States
- Branch: United States Army Coast Artillery Corps
- Type: Coast artillery
- Role: Harbor Defense Command
- Part of: First Army 1933–1941; Eastern Defense Command 1941–1945
- Garrison/HQ: Fort Rodman, New Bedford, MA
- Mascot(s): Oozlefinch

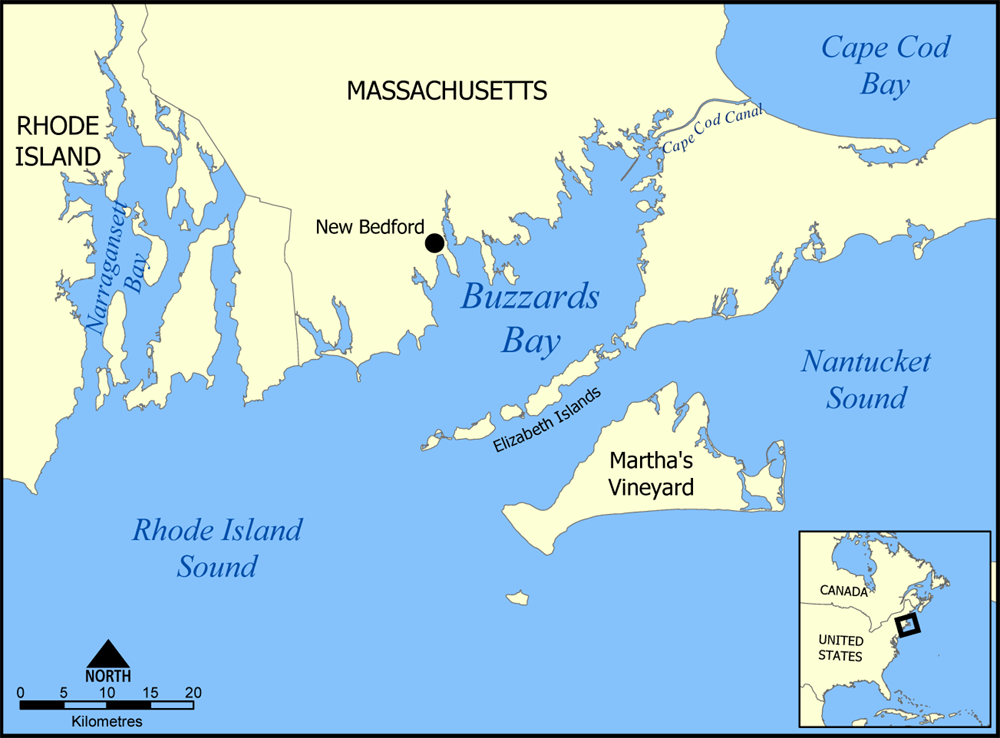
Map of Buzzards Bay, including the New Bedford area.

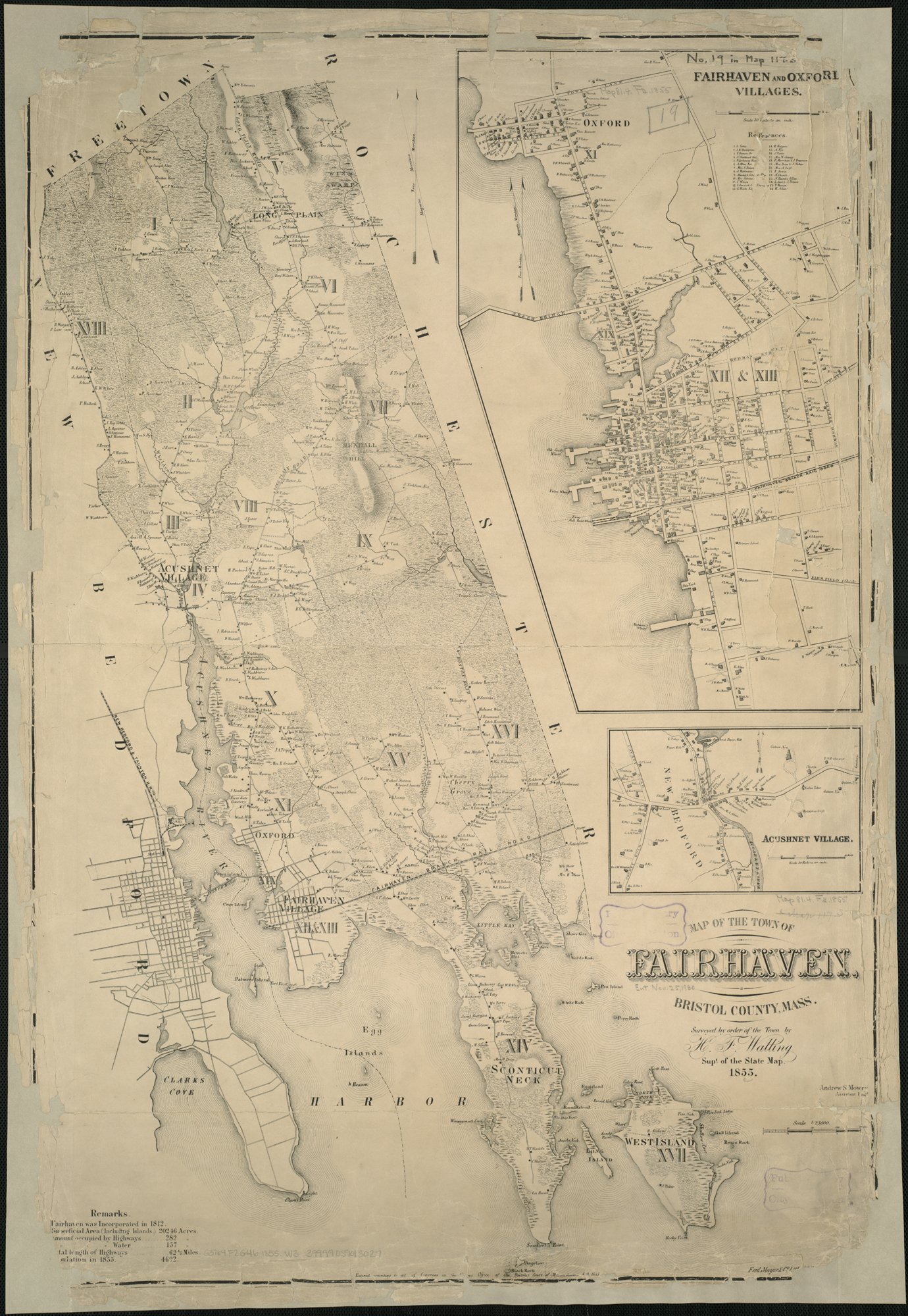
Map of Fairhaven with part of New Bedford, showing Clark's Point in the lower left.

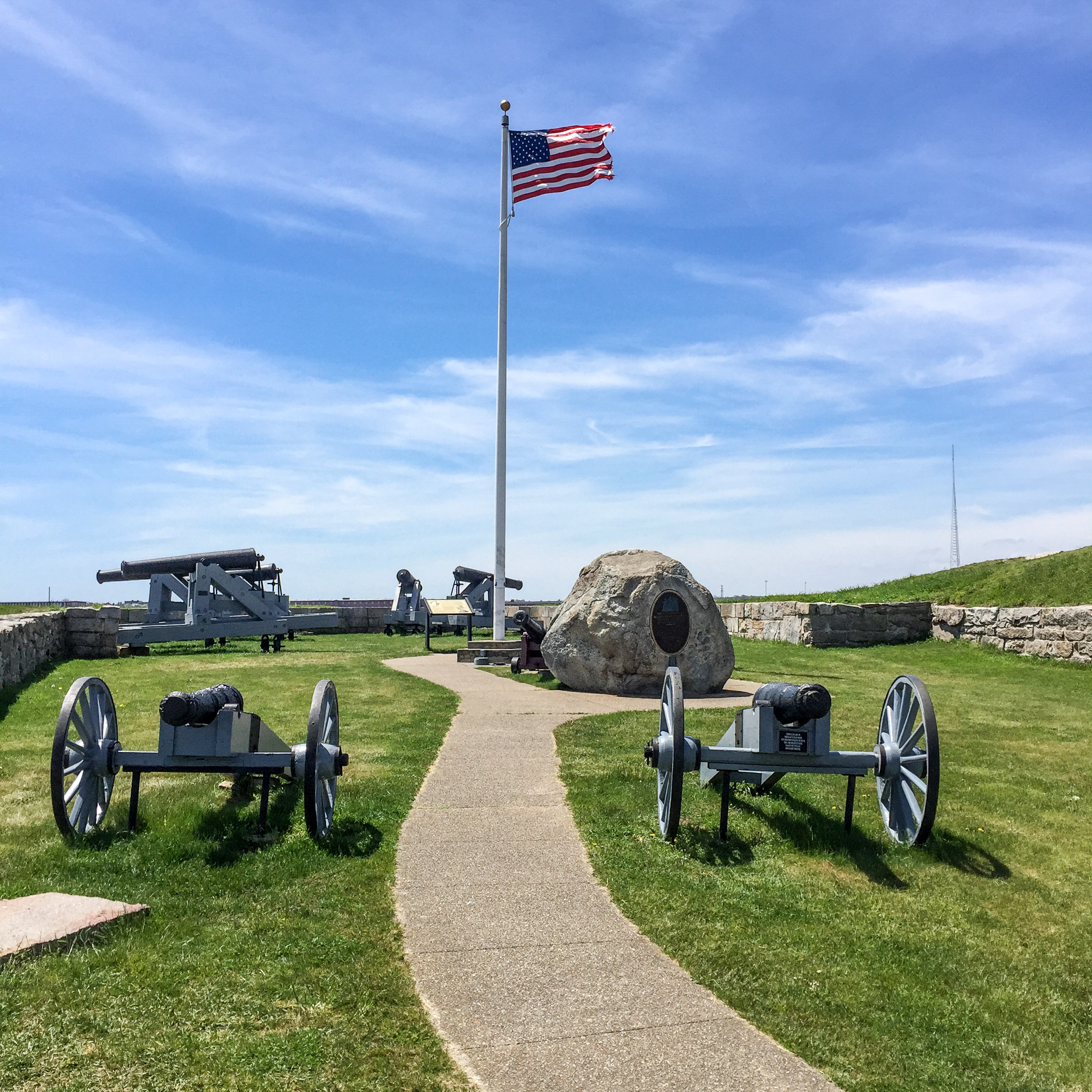
Fort Phoenix.

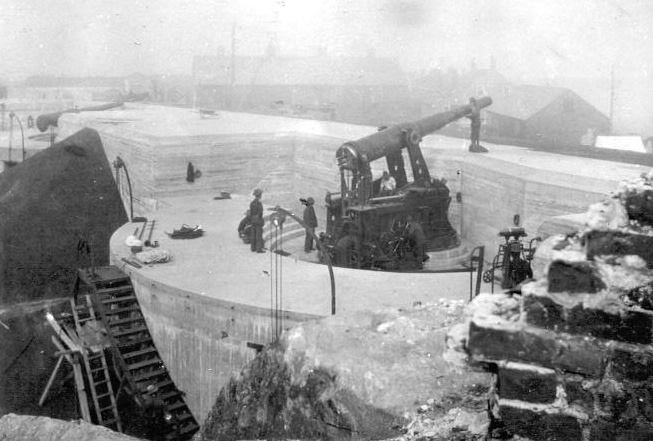
8-inch M1888 disappearing gun emplacement at Fort Constitution, similar to those at Fort Rodman.

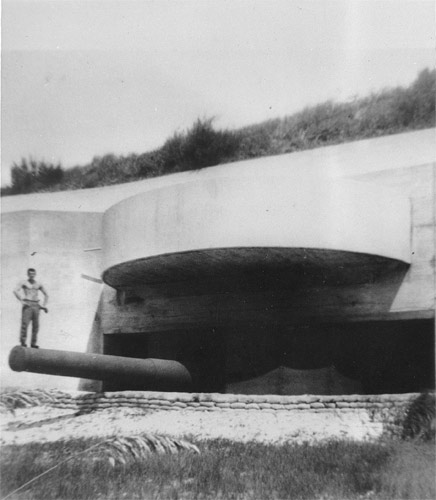
12-inch casemated gun, similar to the guns at Battery Milliken.

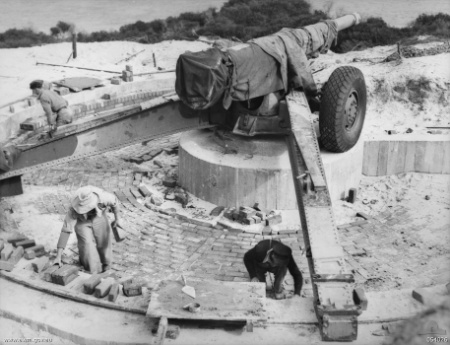
A 155 mm gun on a Panama mount.

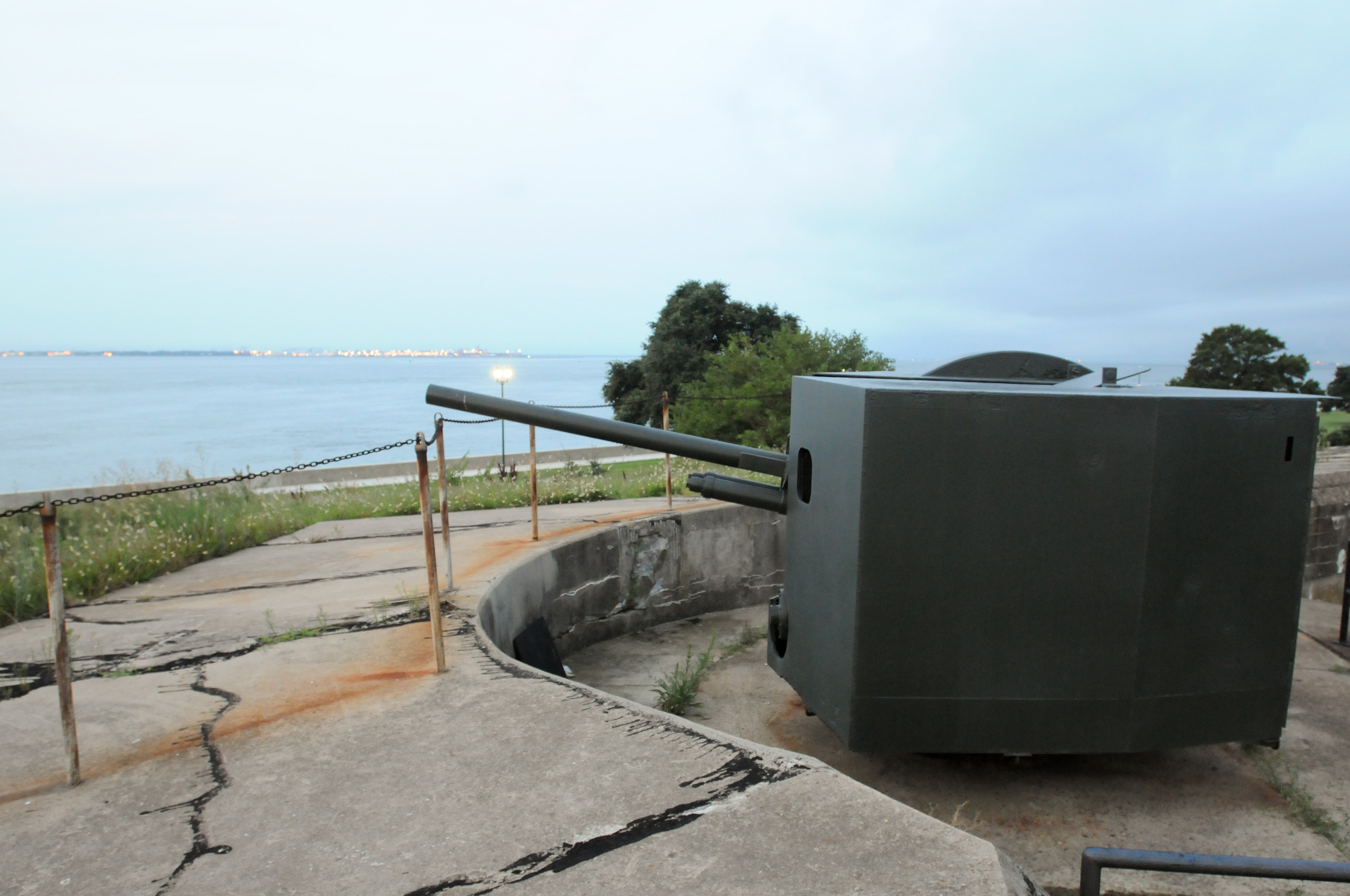
90 mm M1 gun on T3/M3 fixed seacoast mount at Fort Monroe, Virginia.

The Harbor Defenses of New Bedford was a United States Army Coast Artillery Corps harbor defense command. It coordinated the coast defenses of New Bedford, Massachusetts and the nearby Cape Cod Canal from 1900 to 1950, beginning with the Endicott program. These included a coast artillery fort (Fort Rodman, a.k.a. Fort Taber) and an underwater minefield. The command originated circa 1900 as the New Bedford Artillery District, was renamed Coast Defenses of New Bedford in 1913, and again renamed Harbor Defenses of New Bedford in 1925.

== History ==
=== Early New Bedford forts ===
American Revolution through War of 1812

Two forts were built in the New Bedford area in the American Revolution, a 6-gun (possibly 11-gun) unnamed fort (later named Fort Phoenix) in 1775 in what is now Fairhaven, and the 10-gun Acushnet Fort in 1776 at an uncertain location, possibly on Clark's Point at the site of the later Fort Rodman. The building of the first fort was sparked by the Battle off Fairhaven on 14 May 1775, said to be the first naval engagement of the Revolution. A group of about 30 patriots in the 40-ton sloop Success retrieved two vessels that had been captured by HMS Falcon, taking some British prisoners in the action. Another major action in the Revolution was Grey's raid on 5–6 September 1778, in which the Fairhaven fort was destroyed. A force under Major Israel Fearing drove off the British, both at the fort and when they attempted an attack on the town the next day. The fort was then renamed Fort Fearing.

Fort Fearing was renamed Fort Phoenix in 1784, after the mythical bird that "rose from its ashes", and was rebuilt with Commonwealth resources in 1798, contemporary with but not part of the federal first system of US fortifications.

In 1808 both forts were upgraded, Fort Phoenix with state resources mounting 12 guns, and Acushnet Fort under the federal second system of fortifications, mounting six guns. Reports on Acushnet Fort indicate that it was not officially named, but was called the "fort at Eldridge Point", "two miles below the town", which may indicate Clark's Point. The location of Eldridge Point is unclear from references, but the Eldredge family was prominent in the area. Acushnet Fort seems to have been abandoned after the War of 1812, and probably demolished by the 1840s.

In the War of 1812, HMS Nimrod bombarded Fort Phoenix on 13 June 1814 when the local militia refused to surrender some guns. After an exchange of fire Nimrod sailed away. Local accounts differ as to whether she launched boats carrying a landing party that were driven off, or not. This event is confused in some references with an attack by the same ship on Falmouth on 29 January 1814.

Civil War era

Also known as the Old Stone Fort, the "Fort at Clark's Point" (named Fort Rodman in 1898) began construction in 1857 under the third system of US fortifications, and in 1862 construction became overseen by Henry Robert, author of Robert's Rules of Order and an Army Corps of Engineers officer. The fort, as built, had emplacements for 72 cannon in three tiers; two casemated tiers plus a barbette tier on the fort's roof. Construction was halted in 1867, and the fort as planned was never completed.

After the Civil War began in April 1861, it was apparent that the Fort at Clark's Point was still years from completion. Fort Taber, a small earthwork with six cannon, was built nearby with city resources and named after New Bedford's mayor during that period. It provided a temporary defense until the stone fort was garrisoned in 1863. Fort Taber is marked by a stone outline today, directly behind the stone fort. It was noted at the time that the stone fort's presence interfered with effective fire from Fort Taber, and a battery of field artillery was emplaced east of Fort Taber. The Fort Taber name was unofficially used to refer to the Fort at Clark's Point for many years, even by the garrison in letters home, and is used to refer to the stone fort in some recent references.

Fort Phoenix was refurbished with eight 24-pounder cannon in the Civil War; it was abandoned in 1876.

=== Endicott period ===
The Endicott Board of 1885 recommended a comprehensive replacement of existing coast defenses, and most of its recommendations were implemented. In the New Bedford area this meant new installations at Clark's Point. As with other smaller Endicott installations, all of the new defenses were concentrated at one fort. The Clark's Point area was officially named the Fort Rodman Military Reservation in 1898, in honor of Lieutenant Colonel Logan Rodman, a New Bedford native with the 38th Massachusetts Infantry who died in the assault on Port Hudson, Louisiana in 1863. Armament included two one-gun batteries of 8-inch M1888 disappearing guns, a two-gun battery of 5-inch guns on pedestal mounts, and two two-gun batteries of 3-inch guns on retractable masking parapet mounts. Along with gun batteries, facilities for planting and controlling an underwater minefield were built. The fort was completed in 1902.

=== World War I ===
The American entry into World War I brought many changes to the Coast Artillery and the Coast Defenses of New Bedford (CD New Bedford). Numerous temporary buildings were built at Fort Rodman to accommodate the influx of new recruits. Some weapons were removed from forts with the intent of getting US-made artillery into the fight. Fort Rodman's pair of pedestal-mounted 5-inch guns was transferred to the US Army transport ship USAT Kilpatrick. Both of the fort's 8-inch guns were dismounted as potential railway artillery in 1918, but they did not leave the fort and were remounted in 1919. The 5-inch guns were returned in 1919, but by 1921 they were scrapped as part of a general removal from service of some weapon types. A major upgrade began construction at Fort Rodman during the war, Battery Milliken with two 12-inch guns on long-range barbette carriages, initially in open emplacements. Compared with disappearing carriages, this increased the range of this type of gun from 18,400 yards (16,800 m) to 30,100 yards (27,500 m). This battery was built 1917–1921.

References indicate the authorized strength of CD New Bedford in World War I was five companies, including one from the Rhode Island National Guard.

=== Interwar ===
In 1920 Fort Rodman's M1898 3-inch guns were scrapped as part of a general removal from service of this weapon; they were not replaced.

On 1 July 1924 the harbor defense garrisons completed the transition from a company-based organization to a regimental one, and on 9 June 1925 the commands were renamed from "Coast Defenses..." to "Harbor Defenses...". The 23rd Coast Artillery Regiment was the wartime garrison of the Harbor Defenses of New Bedford (HD New Bedford). This unit was first organized in December 1924 as the 616th Coast Artillery Battalion, but was not activated until 1 February 1940 as the 23rd Coast Artillery Battalion. HD New Bedford was in caretaker status for most of the interwar period, with the 10th Coast Artillery providing a caretaker detachment during at least the later years through early 1940. This caretaker detachment became the nucleus of the 23rd Coast Artillery Battalion, which was gradually activated through mid-1941.

In 1938 a battery of two 155 mm guns on "Panama mounts" (circular concrete platforms) was built at Fort Rodman, probably due to its complete lack of other medium- and small-caliber artillery.

=== World War II ===
Early in World War II numerous temporary buildings were again constructed to accommodate the rapid mobilization of men and equipment. In early 1940 the 23rd Coast Artillery Battalion was mobilized to garrison HD New Bedford.

In 1942 the two 8-inch guns of Batteries Walcott and Barton were scrapped, leaving only the 12-inch Battery Milliken and the 155 mm battery active. Battery Milliken was casemated for protection against air attack during the war.

On 13 September 1943, the 23rd Coast Artillery Battalion was expanded to a regiment due to the construction of new batteries in southeastern Massachusetts, with the transfer of a battalion from the 242nd Coast Artillery. The 242nd was a Connecticut National Guard regiment normally assigned to the Harbor Defenses of Long Island Sound.

Several medium- and small-caliber batteries were built in New Bedford and the Buzzards Bay area during World War II. Chief among these was Battery 210 at Mishaum Point Military Reservation in Dartmouth. It had two 6-inch M1 guns in long-range shielded mounts with a large bunker for ammunition and fire control between them. It currently has a private residence built on the site. A two-gun 155 mm battery was at the location until the 6-inch battery was completed in 1945, along with the harbor entrance control post for New Bedford. The battery in this area served as the examination battery for HD New Bedford.

Defending the passage to New Bedford between Dartmouth and Cuttyhunk Island were two batteries of 90 mm dual-purpose guns, one at Barneys Joy Point Military Reservation and one on Cuttyhunk Island, part of the Elizabeth Islands Military Reservation. These were called Anti-Motor Torpedo Boat Batteries (AMTB) 931 and 932, respectively. The AMTB batteries had an authorized strength of four 90 mm guns, two on fixed mounts and two on towed mounts. An additional 90 mm battery, AMTB 933, was on Nashawena Island, just east of Cuttyhunk Island.

Protecting the southern entrance to the Cape Cod Canal was a two-gun 155 mm battery on Panama mounts, replaced in 1943 by the 90 mm AMTB 934, at Butler Point Military Reservation in Marion.

In early 1944 the US Army (except for the infantry branch) transitioned from a regimental to a battalion-based organization. The 23rd Coast Artillery was reduced to a battalion between 4 February and 12 April 1944. With little threat to the east coast from enemy surface forces, coast defenses were drawn down further. On 7 October 1944 this battalion was absorbed by the Harbor Defenses of New Bedford.

The US Navy also participated in defending the Buzzards Bay area with net defenses and submarine-detecting indicator loops, including a station at Gooseberry Neck in Westport (Station 1I).

Following mobilization in 1940 HD New Bedford was subordinate to First Army. On 24 December 1941 the Eastern Theater of Operations (renamed the Eastern Defense Command three months later) was established, with all east coast harbor defense commands subordinate to it, along with antiaircraft and fighter assets. This command was disestablished in 1946.

=== Post World War II ===
Following the war, it was soon determined that gun defenses were obsolete, and they were scrapped by the end of 1948, with remaining harbor defense functions turned over to the Navy. In 1950 the Coast Artillery Corps and all Army harbor defense commands were dissolved. Today the Air Defense Artillery carries the lineage of some Coast Artillery units.

From the late 1940s through the mid-1970s Fort Rodman served as a military reserve center.

== Present ==
Except for a pair of fire control towers on Cuttyhunk and Nashawena Islands, the only significant remnants of the Harbor Defenses of New Bedford are Fort Rodman (in Fort Taber Park) and Fort Phoenix. The stone fort at Fort Rodman is in a good state of preservation, but is only open to the public on special occasions. A stone outline marks the location of the Civil War Fort Taber. A museum and a World War II M4 Sherman tank recovered from the tragic Exercise Tiger are in the park. As of 2016, the Endicott batteries at Fort Rodman are fenced off and overgrown, but can be viewed. Many of the garrison buildings of Fort Rodman remain; one of the tenants is the University of Massachusetts Dartmouth. Fort Phoenix has several 24-pounder Model 1819 cannon made in the 1820s, plus a cannon said to have been captured by the Continental Marines during the raid on Nassau in the Bahamas in 1776. This raid was the first amphibious landing on foreign soil by United States Marines.

== Coat of arms ==
The Harbor Defenses of New Bedford's coat of arms was as follows:

- Blazon
  - Shield: Gules, an arm embowed brandishing a harpoon proper.
- Symbolism: The City of New Bedford from its earliest days was known as the "Whaling City", which accounts for the arm and harpoon on the shield.

== See also ==
- Seacoast defense in the United States
- Harbor Defense Command
- List of coastal fortifications of the United States
