= 23rd Coast Artillery (United States) =

23rd Coast Artillery Regiment
- Active: 1940 - 1944
- Country: United States
- Branch: Army
- Type: Coastal artillery
- Role: Harbor defense
- Size: Regiment
- Part of: Harbor Defenses of New Bedford
- Garrison/HQ: Fort Rodman
- Motto(s): "Strike Straight"
- Mascot(s): Oozlefinch

The 23rd Coast Artillery Regiment was a Coast Artillery Corps regiment in the United States Army. It was the garrison of the Harbor Defenses of New Bedford, Massachusetts (HD New Bedford) in World War II, as a battalion in February 1940 through expansion to a regiment in September 1943, then reduced to a battalion in February 1944 until inactivated in October 1944.

== Lineage ==
Constituted in the Organized Reserve (OR) 1 July 1924 as the 616th Coast Artillery Battalion and allotted to HD New Bedford, Massachusetts. Organized December 1924 with personnel of the 575th, 576th, and 577th CA companies, OR (formed 21 April). Expanded and redesignated 616th CA Regiment 19 March 1926 and assigned to the Harbor Defenses of Narragansett Bay as well as HD New Bedford. On 1 September 1935 was withdrawn from the OR and allotted to the Regular Army as the 616th CA Battalion. Redesignated as the 22nd Coast Artillery Battalion (Harbor Defense) (HD) and HHB activated 1 February 1940 at Fort Rodman, Massachusetts by reorganizing caretaker detachment of HHB 10th Coast Artillery.

- Battery A activated 1 August 1940 to garrison Battery Milliken (12-inch guns).
- One source states the battalion was redesignated as a regiment on 27 December 1940, but reduced to a battalion on 21 August 1941.
- Batteries B and C activated 15 January 1941 to man mine defenses and harbor defense searchlights.
- Battery D activated 1 June 1941.
- Four Anti-Motor Torpedo Boat (AMTB) batteries with 90 mm guns were constructed by July 1943 at Barneys Joy Point, Cuttyhunk and Nashawena Islands, and Butler Point, defending the approaches to southeastern Massachusetts and the Cape Cod Canal. On 13 September 1943 the 23rd CA was expanded to a regiment to garrison these batteries. HHB 3rd Battalion and Batteries G, H, and I of the 242nd Coast Artillery were transferred from HD Long Island Sound and redesignated 2nd Battalion and Batteries D, E, and F of the 23rd CA. Batteries A, D, E, and F manned the AMTB batteries.
- On 4 February 1944 the 23rd CA was reduced to a battalion. 1st Battalion HHB and Batteries C, D, E, and F were inactivated. Some of their personnel were reassigned within the battalion, others were transferred to Army Ground Forces at Camp Hood, Texas, probably for reassignment as replacements for overseas units. On 6 March 1944 the inactive elements of the 23rd CA were disbanded. HHB and Batteries A and B were redesignated as the same elements of HD New Bedford, it is unclear on what date but may be 7 October 1944. Remaining elements of the 23rd CA were inactivated 7 October 1944 (redesignated as Battery C (searchlight), HD New Bedford).
- Another source states the regiment was reduced to a battalion on 6 March 1944, with 1st and 2nd Battalions (probably only their HHBs) inactivated by 12 April 1944.

== See also ==
- Seacoast defense in the United States
- United States Army Coast Artillery Corps
- Harbor Defense Command
