= Acushnet Fort =

Fort on Eldridge Point in New Bedford, Massachusetts, USA (1776 to c. 1820)

- Eldridge Point, New Bedford, Massachusetts

Site information
- Type: Coastal Defense

Location
- Location in Massachusetts
- Coordinates: 41°35′36″N 70°54′07″W

Site history
- Built: 1776, rebuilt 1808
- In use: 1776-circa 1820
- Demolished: circa 1820?
- Battles/wars: American Revolution; War of 1812

Acushnet Fort was a fort that existed from 1776 to around 1820 on Eldridge Point in New Bedford, Massachusetts. It was originally built with Commonwealth resources during the American Revolution in 1776 with ten guns. Rebuilt in 1808 under the federal second system of fortifications, it could accommodate 40 men and had six guns and a magazine.

The fort's exact location, especially in the Revolution, is uncertain. The fort appears in the Secretary of War's reports for 1808 and 1811; thus it was a federal fort at that time. In 1808 the entry is: "At the entrance of the inner harbor of New Bedford, two miles below the town, a small enclosed work has been erected of stone, brick, and sod. It commands the entrance into the harbor for a mile and a half in a direct line...". In 1811 the entry is: "At Eldridge Point, which commands the entrance of the harbor; an enclosed work of masonry, mounting six heavy guns...". The "two miles below the town" implies the fort was at or near Clark's Point, later the site of Fort Rodman. Another possibility is the area of Fairhaven known as Poverty Point or Oxford Point, part of which was once owned by the Eldredge family, although this is north of the harbor entrance. Fairhaven was part of New Bedford until 1812.

A list of fort commanders shows that the Eldridge Point fort was commanded by Captain James Thomas of the Dragoons in 1810–1811, followed by 1st Lt. Henry Whiting, also of the Dragoons, in 1811–1812.

By the time Fort Rodman was built in the 1850s, the fort no longer existed.

== See also ==
- Harbor Defenses of New Bedford
- Fort Phoenix
- List of military installations in Massachusetts
