= Barneys Joy Point Military Reservation =

United States Coastal Defense Site

- Part of Harbor Defenses of New Bedford
- Dartmouth, Massachusetts
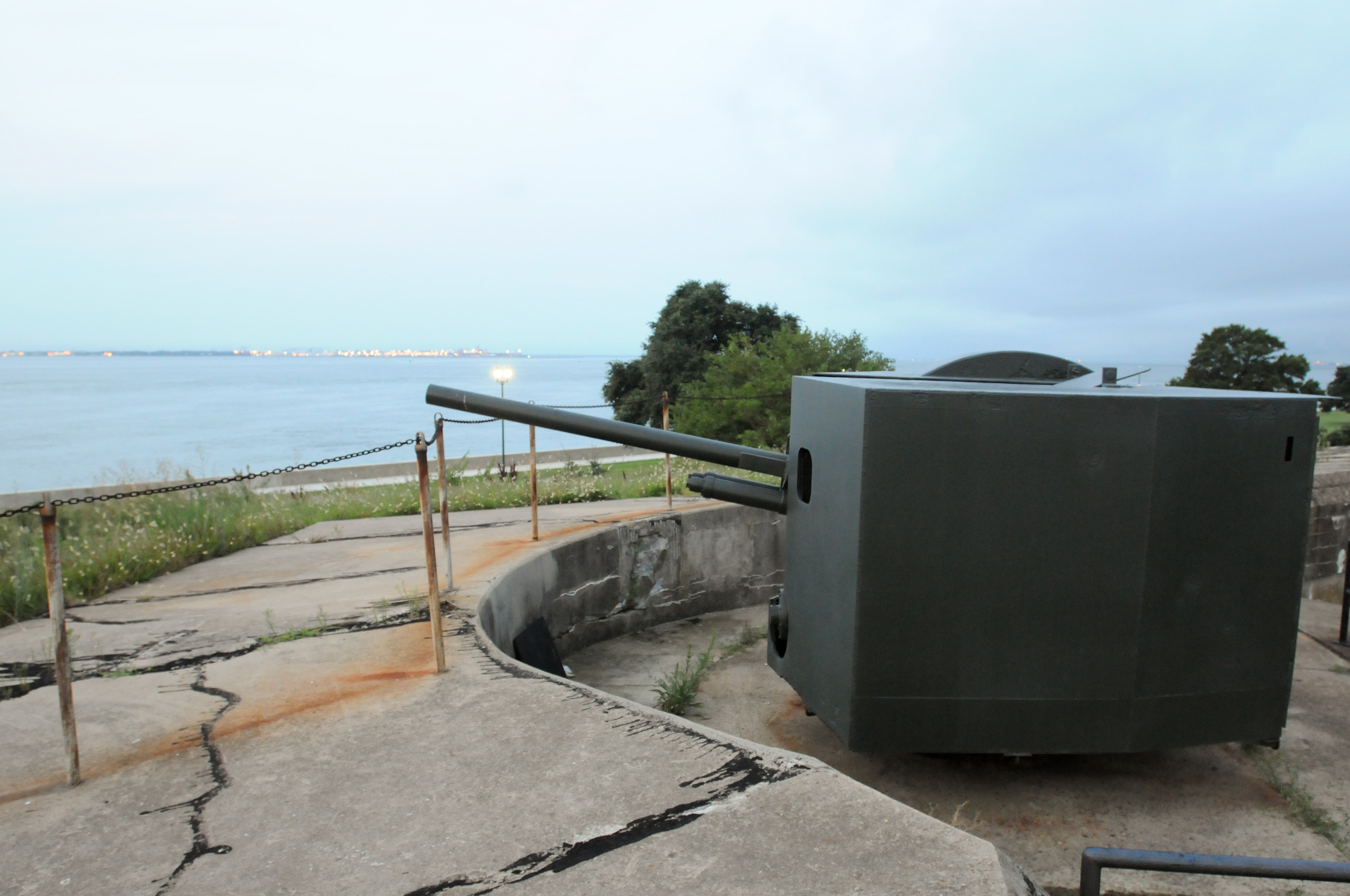
- 90 mm M1 gun on T3/M3 fixed seacoast mount at Fort Monroe, Virginia.

Site information
- Type: Coastal Defense

Location
- Location in Massachusetts
- Coordinates: 41°30′37.99″N 70°59′0.81″W

Site history
- Built: 1943
- Built by: United States Army
- In use: 1943-1946
- Battles/wars: World War II

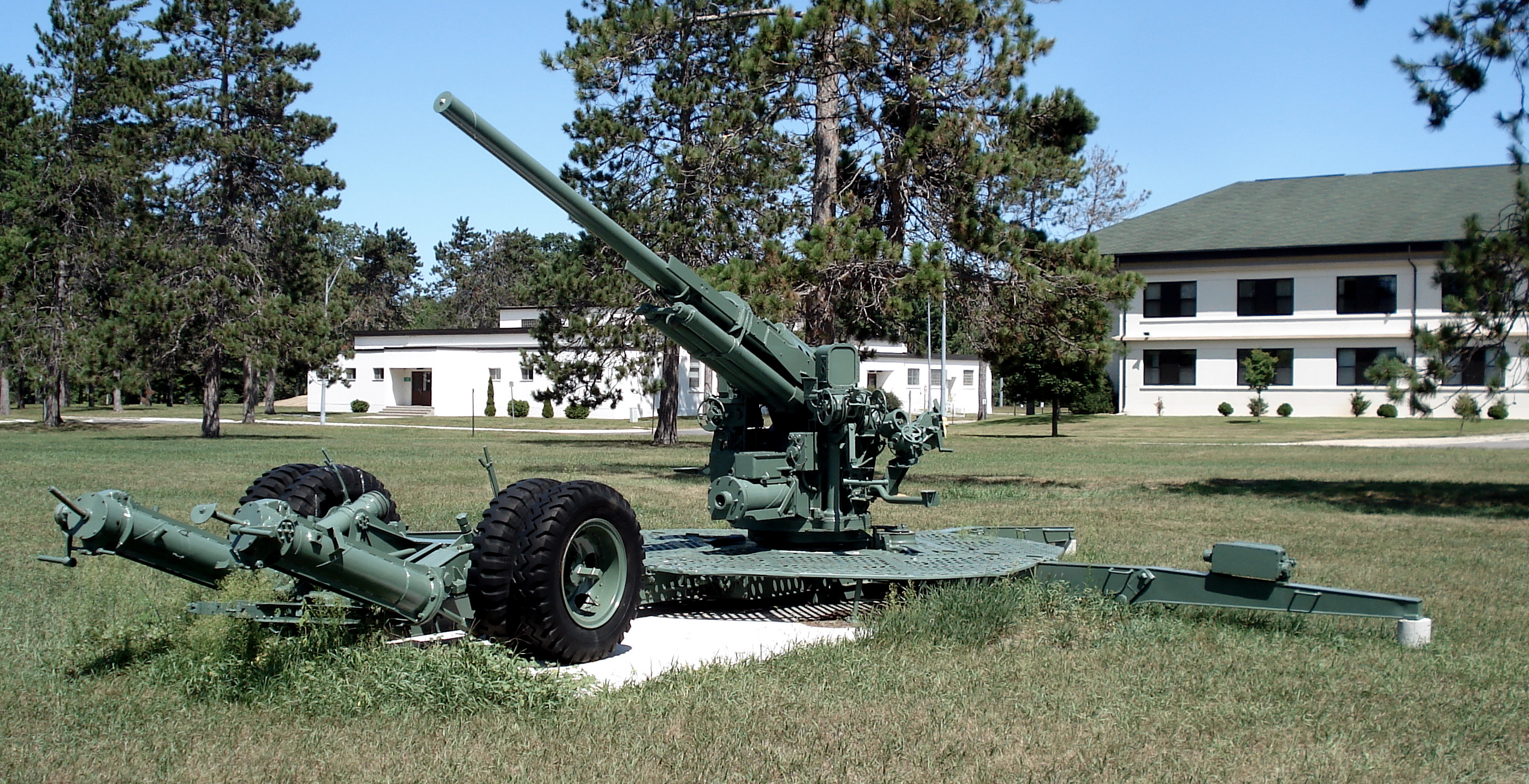
90 mm M1 gun on towed mount at CFB Borden, Canada.

Barneys Joy Point Military Reservation was a World War II coastal defense site located in Dartmouth, Massachusetts.

== History ==
The Barneys Joy Point Military Reservation was built on land acquired by the US government in 1943. Its mission was to protect the approaches to New Bedford from possible air and naval attack. It never fired its guns in anger, but it played an important part in the defense of the Cape Cod Canal.

The reservation had one Anti-Motor Torpedo Boat (AMTB) battery of four 90 mm guns called AMTB 931. This battery had an authorized strength of four 90 mm guns, two on fixed mounts and two on towed mounts, plus two towed 37 mm M1 guns or 40 mm Bofors M1 guns. It was mirrored across the channel by two similar batteries of the Elizabeth Islands Military Reservation, one on Cuttyhunk Island and one on Nashawena Island.

The site was disarmed in 1946.

=== Present ===
Nothing remains of the site today except for some concrete foundations and wells; it is a grassy field next to the ocean. Reportedly one gun block for a fixed 90 mm mount is visible and the other is buried.

== See also ==
- Seacoast defense in the United States
- United States Army Coast Artillery Corps
- List of military installations in Massachusetts
