= Mishaum Point Military Reservation =

American costal defence site in WW2

- Part of Harbor Defenses of New Bedford
- Dartmouth, Massachusetts
- 6-inch gun at Fort Columbia State Park, Washington state, similar to Battery 210.

Site information
- Type: Coastal Defense
- Owner: private
- Open to the public: no
- Condition: built on

Location
- Location in Massachusetts
- Coordinates: 41°30′54.84″N 70°57′13.94″W

Site history
- Built: 1943-1945
- Built by: United States Army
- In use: 1943–1947
- Battles/wars: World War II

Garrison information
- Garrison: Fort Rodman

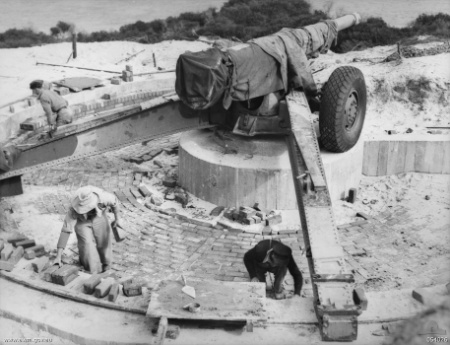
A 155 mm gun on a Panama mount.

Mishaum Point Military Reservation was a coastal defense site located in Dartmouth, Massachusetts as part of the Harbor Defenses of New Bedford.

== History ==
The Mishaum Point Military Reservation was built on land purchased in 1943. Its mission was to protect the Cape Cod Canal and New Bedford from possible air and naval attack. It never fired its guns in anger, but it did play an important part in the defense of the canal. The site also contained the Harbor Entrance Control Post for New Bedford harbor and a fire control tower.

The reservation had a battery of two 6-inch M1 guns on long-range shielded carriages, with a large magazine and fire control bunker between them. The battery was called Battery 210. Additionally, the site initially had a pair of 155 mm towed guns on "Panama mounts", circular concrete platforms for this type of gun. This battery was withdrawn in 1945 when Battery 210 was completed. An Anti-Motor Torpedo Boat (AMTB) battery of four 37 mm towed guns was also on site.

The site was disarmed in 1947 and turned over to the Navy in 1951. The Navy turned the site over to the Air Force in 1958, who operated it as the Mishaum Point Electronics Research Annex until sold to a private party in 1964.

== Present ==
Demolition of the Harbor Entrance Control Post was completed in about 1970 when the first mansion was built atop Battery 210. Most other non-tactical structures were removed in 1970. Battery 210 still has a mansion atop it and some foundations remain from former military structures.

== See also ==
- Seacoast defense in the United States
- United States Army Coast Artillery Corps
- List of military installations in Massachusetts
