= Fort Phoenix =

- U.S. National Register of Historic Places
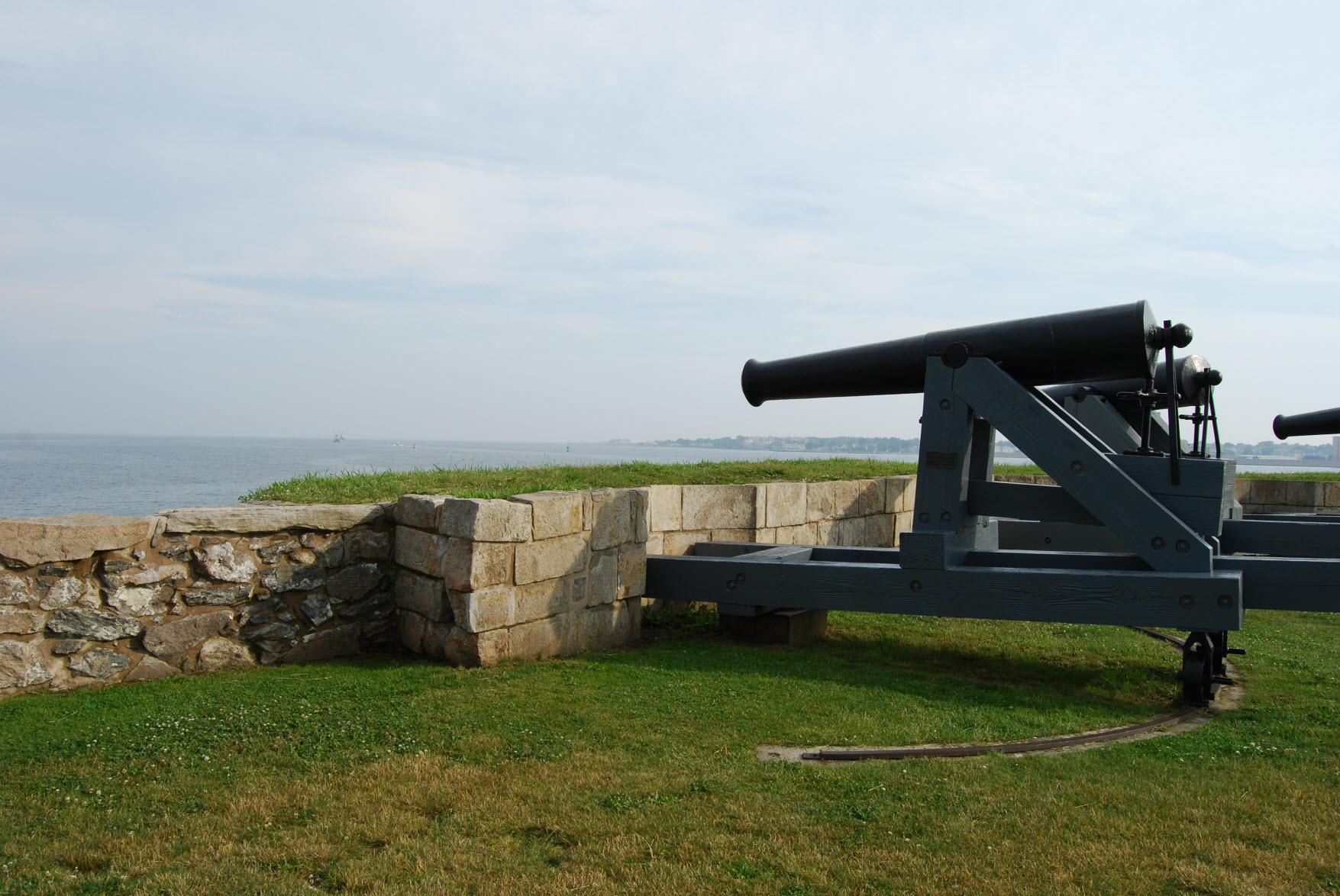

- Location within Massachusetts Location within the United States
- Location: Fairhaven, Massachusetts
- Coordinates: 41°37′27″N 70°54′08″W
- Built: 1775
- NRHP reference No.: 72000120
- Added to NRHP: 9 November 1972

Fort Phoenix is a former American Revolutionary War-era fort located at the entrance to the Fairhaven-New Bedford harbor, south of U.S. 6 in Fort Phoenix Park in Fairhaven, Massachusetts. The fort was originally built in 1775 without a name, and added to the National Register of Historic Places in 1972. Just off the fort, in Buzzards Bay, was the first naval engagement of the American Revolution, the Battle of Fairhaven on 14 May 1775.

On 5–6 September 1778, the fort was destroyed by the British when they raided the harbor. A force under Major Israel Fearing drove off the British, both at the fort and when they attempted an attack on the town the next day. The fort was then renamed Fort Fearing. In 1784 it was given the name "Fort Phoenix" after the mythical bird that rose from its own ashes.

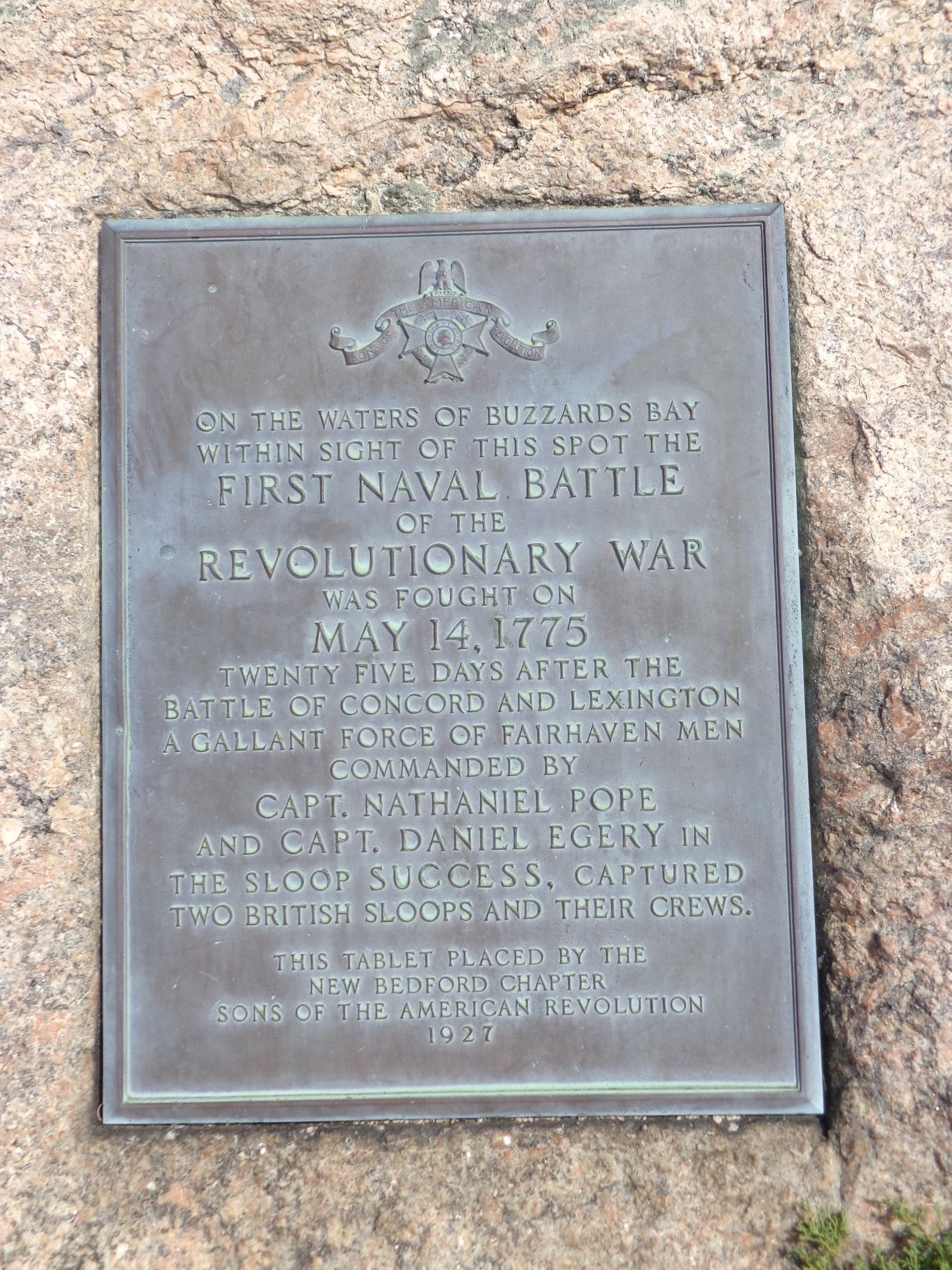
Battle off Fairhaven Plaque, Fort Phoenix

The fort was rebuilt in 1798, and rebuilt again in 1808 with 12 guns with Commonwealth resources, contemporary with but not part of the second system of US fortifications.

In the War of 1812, HMS Nimrod bombarded the fort on 13 June 1814 when the local militia refused to surrender some guns. After an exchange of fire Nimrod sailed away. Local accounts differ as to whether she launched boats carrying a landing party that were driven off, or not. This event is confused in some references with an attack by the same ship on Falmouth on 29 January 1814.

The fort currently has five iron cannons mounted on reproduction wooden carriages. The cannons are Model 1819 24-pounders. Their trunnions are marked, “W.F.” on one side and “1828” on the opposite side, indicating they were cast at the West Point Foundry in Cold Spring, New York, in the year 1828. They were installed at the fort sometime before the Civil War along with three similar guns which were later transferred out of the fort near the end of the war.

There is also a smaller cannon at the fort which was captured by the Continental Marines during the raid on Nassau in the Bahamas in 1776. This raid was the first amphibious landing on foreign soil by United States Marines. This gun has been in Fairhaven since about 1777 and one of those originally installed when the fort was built.

In recent years, two more cannons, mounted on field artillery carriages have been installed at the fort. Donated to the Town of Fairhaven by the New Bedford Whaling Museum, the barrels of the guns are thought to date to the War of 1812, but they have no direct connection to Fort Phoenix.

The fort was rebuilt with a new powder magazine and regarrisoned with eight guns in the Civil War.

During World War II an Anti-Motor Torpedo Boat (AMTB) battery of four towed 37 mm guns was at the fort.

Today, historical encampments are staged at Fort Phoenix in the spring and fall by a local reenacting group, the Fairhaven Village Militia.

== See also ==
- Media related to Fort Phoenix (Massachusetts) at Wikimedia Commons
- Harbor Defenses of New Bedford
- Acushnet Fort
- National Register of Historic Places listings in Bristol County, Massachusetts
- List of military installations in Massachusetts
