= Cuttyhunk Light =

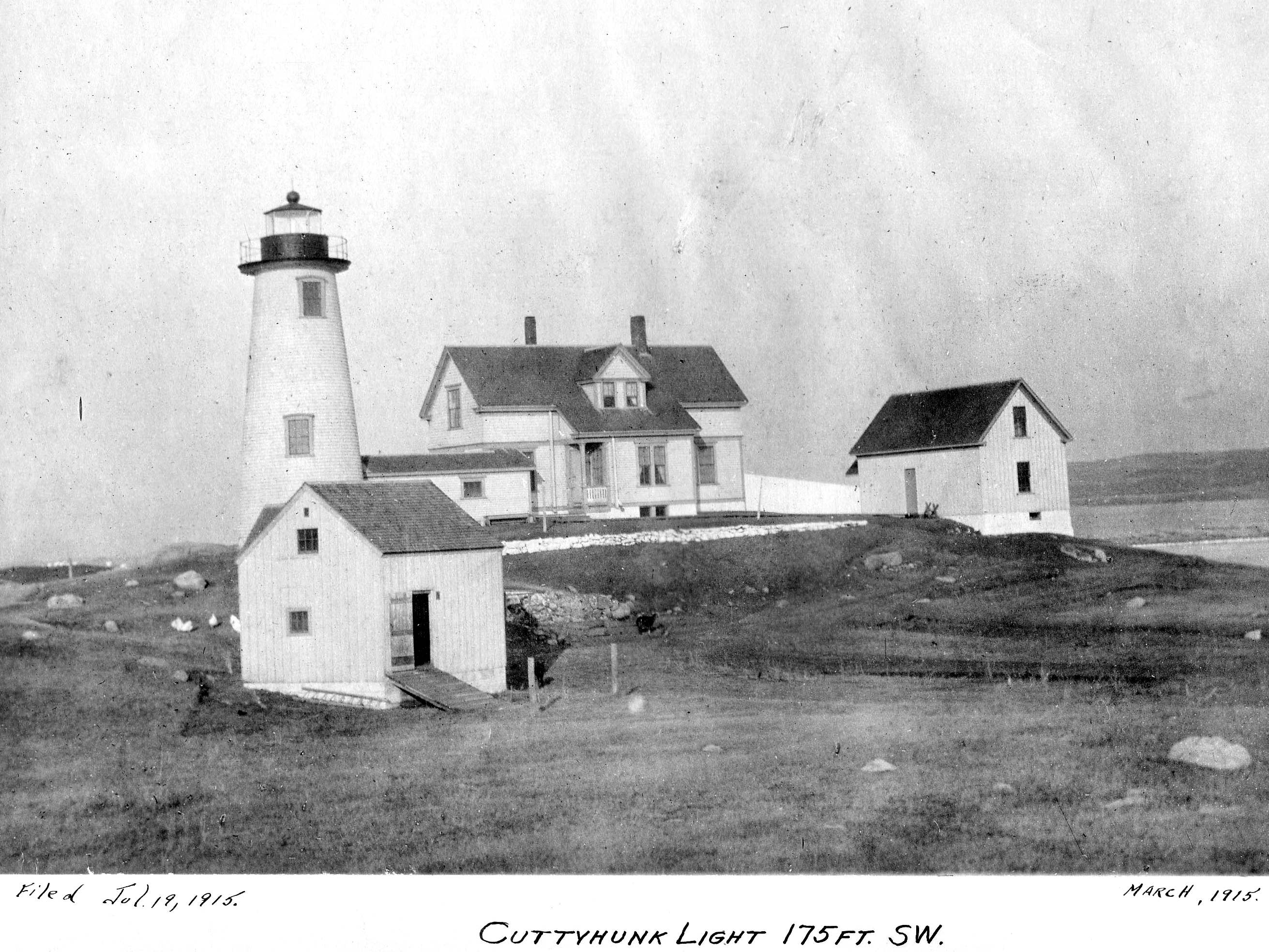
- The 1915 Lighthouse, USCG photo
- Location: Cuttyhunk Island, Massachusetts
- Coordinates: 41°24′51″N 70°56′59″W

Tower
- Constructed: 1823
- Height: 18 m (59 ft)
- Shape: Skeleton Tower
- Markings: NR Dayboard

Light
- First lit: 1947 (skeleton tower)
- Deactivated: 2005
- Focal height: 63ft (19m)
- Lens: fifth order Fresnel lens
- Range: 8nm
- Characteristic: Q W

Cuttyhunk Light was a lighthouse at the west end of Cuttyhunk Island, Massachusetts. First established in 1823, it was rebuilt several times. The last lighthouse was built in 1891, with a 5th order Fresnel Lens in a 45-foot (14 m) tower. This was heavily damaged in the Great Atlantic Hurricane of 1944 and was torn down in 1947 and replaced by a skeleton tower. The keeper's house was also destroyed. The skeleton tower was discontinued in 2005. Only a stone oil house remains from the lighthouse station, missing its door and roof.
