= Elizabeth Islands Military Reservation =

- Part of Harbor Defenses of New Bedford
- Gosnold, Massachusetts
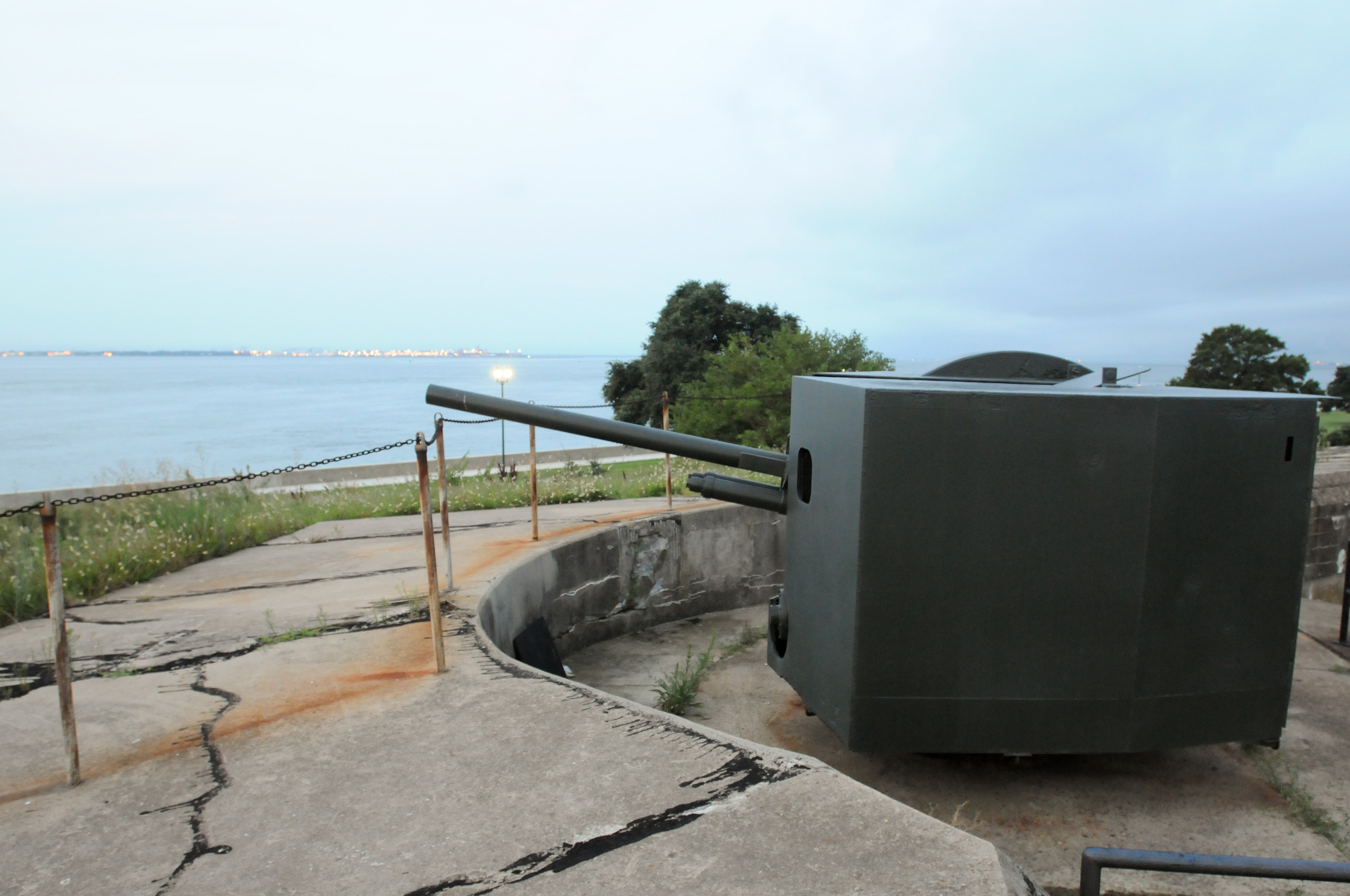
- 90 mm M1 gun on T3/M3 fixed seacoast mount at Fort Monroe, Virginia.

Site information
- Type: Coastal Defense
- Owner: private

Location
- Location in Massachusetts
- Coordinates: 41°25′21.79″N 70°54′0.88″W

Site history
- Built: 1943
- Built by: United States Army
- In use: 1943-1946
- Battles/wars: World War II

Garrison information
- Garrison: Cuttyhunk, Massachusetts

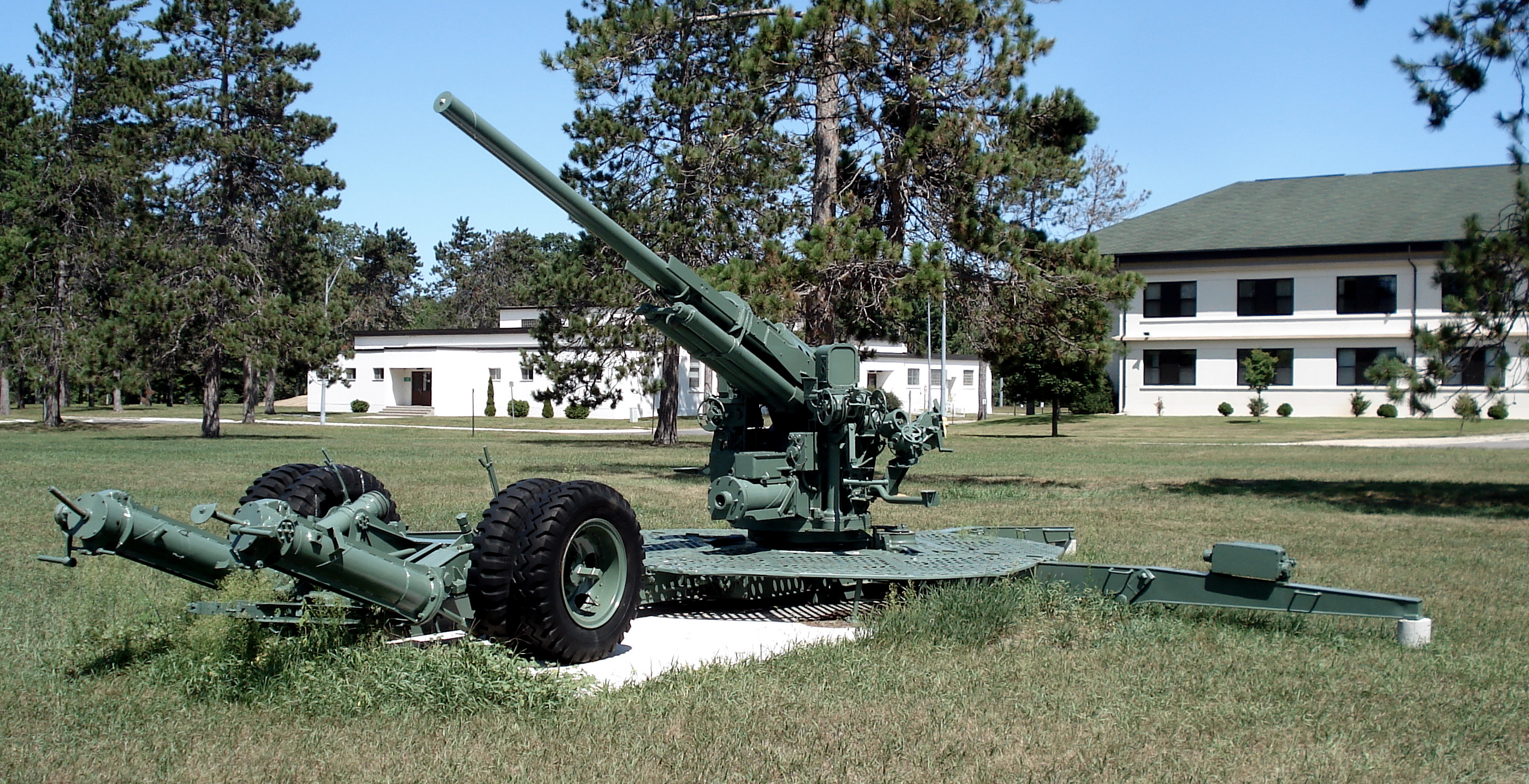
90 mm M1 gun on towed mount at CFB Borden, Canada.

Elizabeth Islands Military Reservation was a World War II coastal defense site located on Cuttyhunk Island and Nashawena Island in the town of Gosnold, Massachusetts.

== History ==
The Elizabeth Islands Military Reservation was built on land acquired by the US government in 1943. It consisted of an early radar, an observation post, fire control towers, and artillery batteries.

The reservation had two Anti-Motor Torpedo Boat (AMTB) batteries of four 90 mm guns each, AMTB 932 on the northern tip of Cuttyhunk and AMTB 933 on Fox Point, Nashawena. Each battery had an authorized strength of four 90 mm guns, two on fixed mounts and two on towed mounts, plus two towed 37 mm M1 guns or 40 mm Bofors M1 guns. These were mirrored across the channel by a single 90 mm AMTB battery at the Barneys Joy Point Military Reservation.

Both islands were disarmed in 1946.

=== Present ===
The site today consists of the foundations of the various buildings and gun blocks. Two fire control towers also remain standing.

== See also ==
- Seacoast defense in the United States
- United States Army Coast Artillery Corps
- List of military installations in Massachusetts
