= Battle off Fairhaven =

Naval engagement in the American Revolution

- Part of the American Revolutionary War
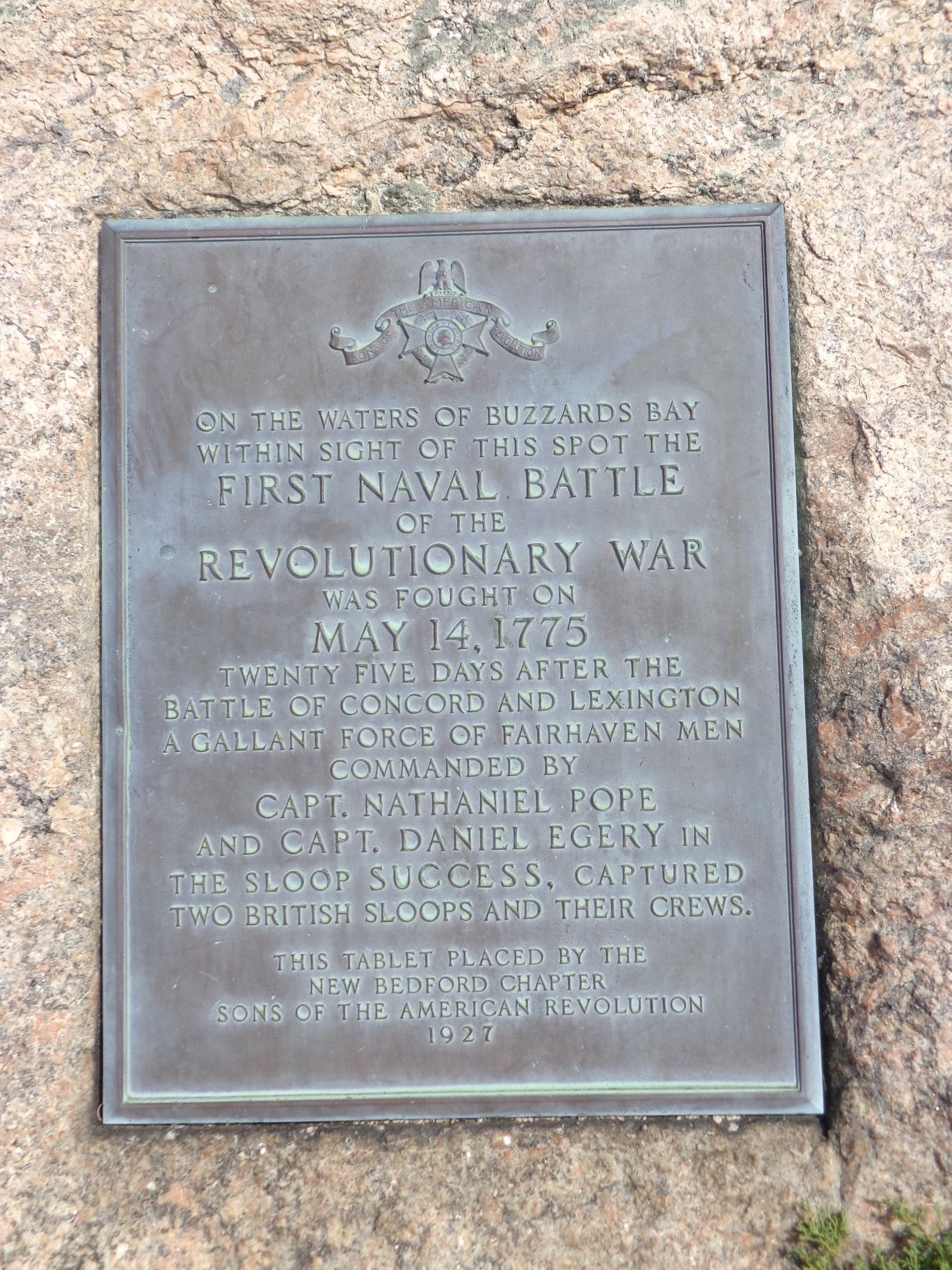
- 1st Naval Battle American Revolution Fort Phoenix, Fairhaven
Date	14 May 1775
Location	Fairhaven, Massachusetts 41.54°N 70.83°W
Result	American victory

Belligerents
United Colonies; Massachusetts Bay	Great Britain

Commanders and leaders
Daniel Egery; Nathaniel Pope	John Linzee (Lindsey)

Strength
Private sloop Success; 30 militia men (Massachusetts militia)	HMS Falcon about 110 Royal Navy seamen

Casualties and losses
none	1 killed 2 wounded 13 prisoners

The Battle off Fairhaven was the first naval engagement of the American Revolutionary War. It took place on May 14, 1775, in Buzzards Bay off Fairhaven, Massachusetts (then part of Dartmouth, Massachusetts) and resulted in Patriot militia retrieving two vessels that had been captured by HMS Falcon. The patriots also captured the 13 man crew of the Royal Navy, the first naval prisoners of the war.

== Context ==
On April 19, 1775, the American Revolutionary War began with the Battles of Lexington and Concord in the British Province of Massachusetts Bay. Following the battle, the militia that had mustered to oppose the British besieged the city of Boston where the British troops were located.

On 13 May 1775, HMS Falcon caught two patriot vessels whose owners, Jesse Barlow and Simeon Wing—the latter's vessel commanded by his son Thomas—were from Sandwich, Massachusetts.

== Engagement ==
A group of 30 patriots from Fairhaven were led by Captain Daniel Egery and Captain Nathaniel Pope of Fairhaven in the sloop Success (40 tons). This militia also included Benjamin Spooner, Noah Stoddard and Barnabas Hammond. They retrieved two patriot vessels captured by the British crew of Captain John Linzee (Lindsey), Royal Navy commander of HMS Falcon (14 guns, 110 men). The patriots took 13 British crew, the first naval prisoners of the war; two of them were wounded and one of them died.

The people of Fairhaven went on to capture additional British ships. Privateers and others operating out of Fairhaven continued to harass British ships throughout the war.
