= Nashawena Island =

Island in Dukes County, Massachusetts, United States

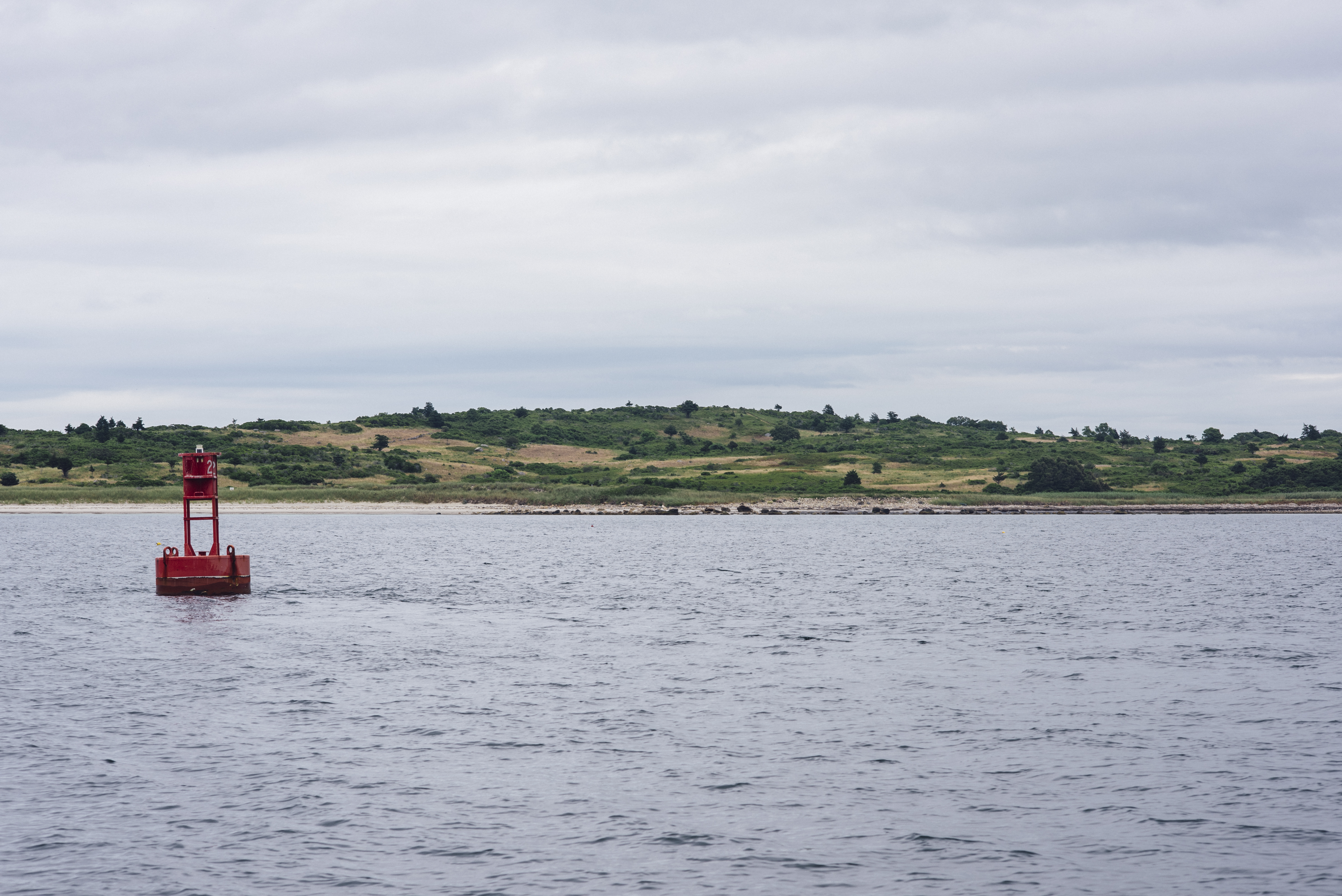
- Nashawena Island from Quicks Hole

- Location within Massachusetts Location within the United States

Geography
- Location: Between Cuttyhunk Island and Pasque Island
- Coordinates: 41°25′45″N 70°52′28″W
- Archipelago: Elizabeth Islands
- Total islands: 1
- Area: 2.732 sq mi (7.08 km^{2})
- Highest elevation: 82 ft (25 m)

Administration
- United States
- State: Massachusetts
- County: Dukes County
- Town: Gosnold

Demographics
- Population: 2 (2000)

Additional information
- Postal code: 02713
- Area code: 508 / 774

Nashawena Island is the second largest of the Elizabeth Islands of Dukes County, Massachusetts, United States. It lies between Cuttyhunk Island to the west and Pasque Island to the east. The island has a land area of 7.076 square kilometres (2.732 sq mi; 1,749 acres) and a population of two persons as of the 2000 U.S. Census. The island is part of the town of Gosnold, Massachusetts. Nashawena is a Wampanoag word meaning "middle island". Rock Island and Baret Island are two small islands located north of Nashawena.
