= Cuttyhunk Island =

Island in Massachusetts, US

Cuttyhunk
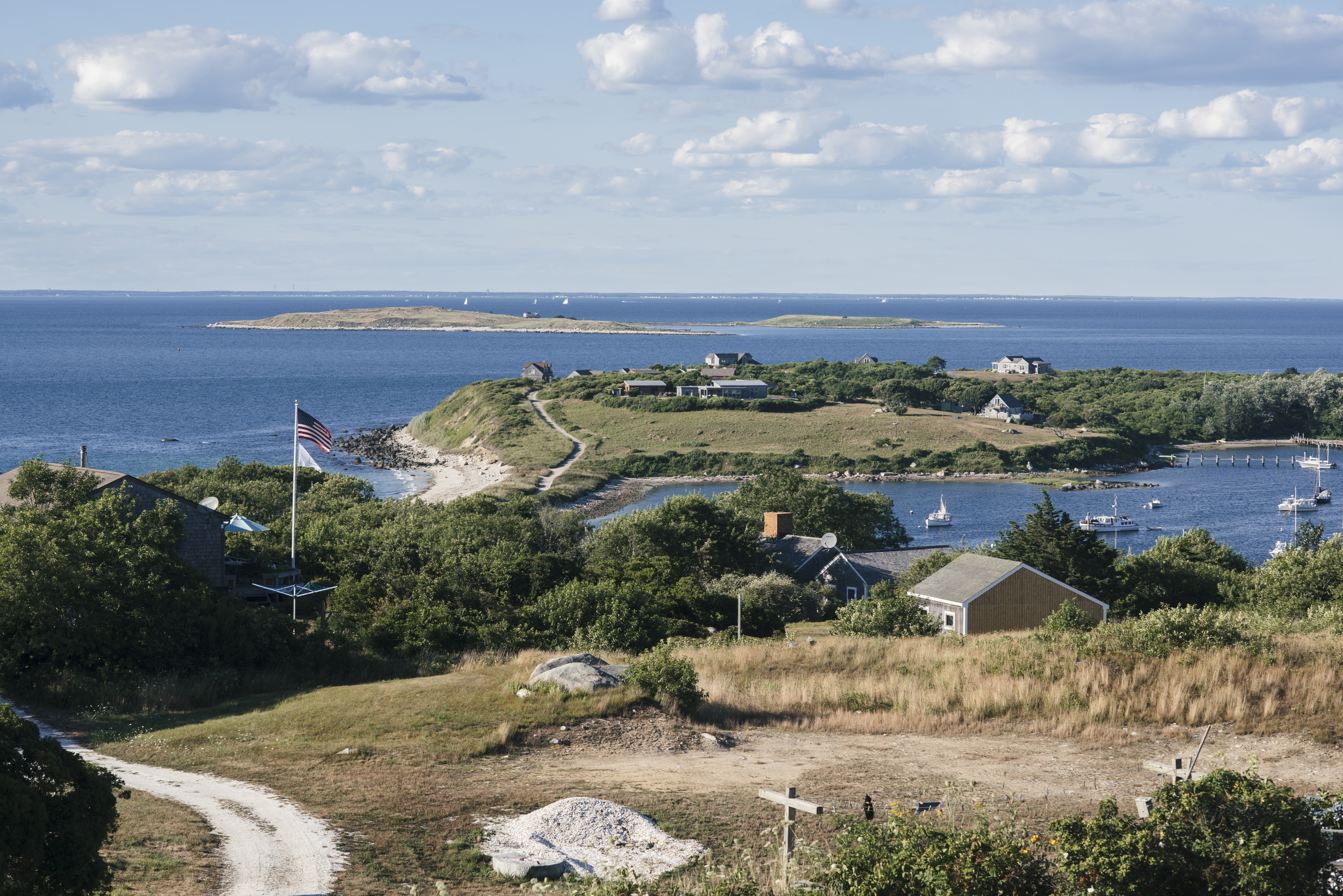
- View of Cuttyhunk Island in 2022 from Lookout Hill

- Location of Cuttyhunk Island in Massachusetts Location in the United States

Geography
- Location: between Buzzards Bay and Vineyard Sound
- Coordinates: 41°25′8″N 70°56′2″W
- Archipelago: Elizabeth Islands
- Area: 2.35 km^{2} (0.91 sq mi)
- Length: 1.5 mi (2.4 km)
- Width: .75 mi (1.21 km)
- Highest elevation: 154 ft (46.9 m)
- Highest point: Lookout Hill

Administration
- United States
- State: Massachusetts
- County: Dukes
- Town: Gosnold

Demographics
- Population: 10
- Pop. density: 23.32/km^{2} (60.4/sq mi)

Additional information
- Postal code: 02713
- Area code: 508 / 774

Cuttyhunk Island is the outermost of the Elizabeth Islands in Massachusetts. A small outpost for the harvesting of sassafras was occupied for a few weeks in 1602, arguably making it the first English settlement in New England. Cuttyhunk is located between Buzzards Bay to the north and Vineyard Sound to the south. Penikese Island and Nashawena Island are located to the north and east respectively.

The island has a land area of 580 acres (0.91 sq mi; 2.3 km^{2}), and an estimated population of 10 residents, swelling to around 400 in the summer months. It is the fourth largest in area of the Elizabeth Islands and home to the village of Cuttyhunk. It lies entirely within the town of Gosnold.

== Geography ==
=== Ecology ===
Cuttyhunk is about a mile and a half long, and three-quarters of a mile wide, with a large natural harbor at the eastern end of the island. Fully half of the main part of the island is set apart as a nature preserve. It is home to a wide variety of birds such as piping plovers, least terns and Massachusetts' American oystercatchers, as well as White-tailed deer, White-footed mice, and Eastern cottontails. It also has a small population of coyotes. Cuttyhunk has most varieties of New England's wildflowers, as well as bayberry, sweet peas, and a host of other plant life.

Two large peninsular arms extend from the main body of the island, named Canapitsit (the southern arm) and Copicut Neck (the northern arm). The shore is made up largely of rocks, testimony to Cuttyhunk's glacial origins. Cuttyhunk is covered with rocks and stones that are elsewhere found only in the mountains of Vermont and New Hampshire.

There are three stretches of sandy beach: along the channel that leads to the harbor (Channel Beach), around the sunken barges that connect Canapitsit to the main body of land (Barges Beach), and at Church's Beach, which connects Copicut to the main island. Much of Cuttyhunk's rocky shore is bounded by steep cliffs made of rock, sand, and clay. The western end of the island is taken up by the West End Pond, much of which is currently used for shellfish farming. A monument to Bartholomew Gosnold's 1602 landing stands on a small island in the Pond.

The highest point on the island is Lookout Hill, standing at 154 feet (47 m) above sea level. The Lookout is home to one of the six (one now buried) defensive bunkers built by the United States Coast Guard in 1941 to watch the surrounding ocean for Nazi U-boats. Stripped of their observation equipment and weaponry at the end of World War II, the bunkers are now picnic areas. They offer views of the island and its surrounding waters. The Coast Guard station has not been active since 1964.

==== Striped bass ====
Cuttyhunk has been a popular site for large striped bass. In 1913, Charles Church caught a world-record striped bass that weighed 73 pounds. That record lasted many years. Charles Cinto duplicated the effort, landing a 73-pound striped bass near Cuttyhunk in 1967. Cuttyhunk has been the home port to many notable fishing guides. Many of these guides troll secret lures attached by stainless-steel or nickel-alloy wire along the rocky reefs near the island where large female striped bass reside from the spring through the autumn. The most notable reef, Sow and Pigs Reef, was where Mr. Cinto caught his striped bass.

== History ==
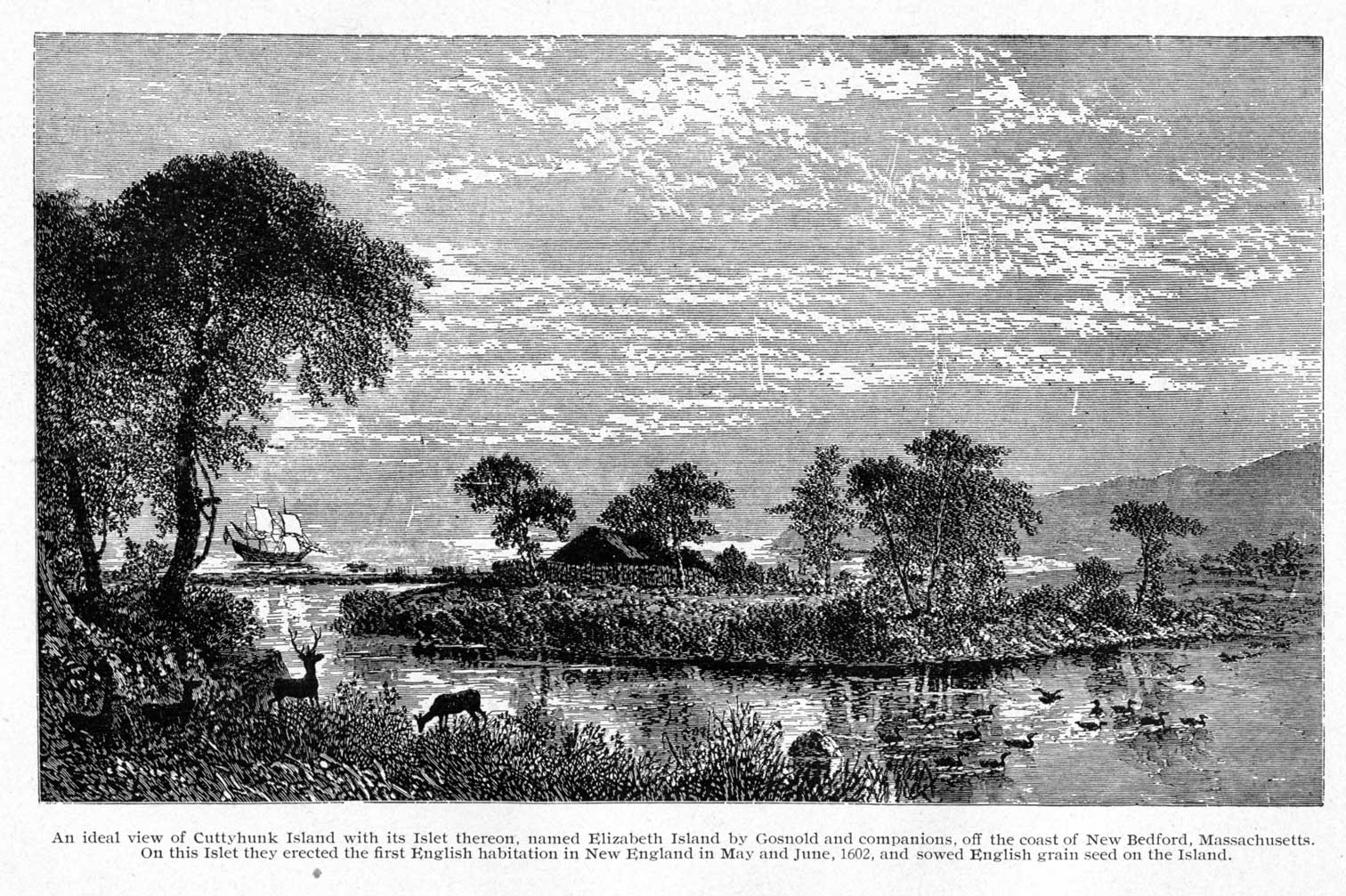
Artist's conception of the fort built by Bartholomew Gosnold's expedition on Elizabeth Islet, Cuttyhunk Island, Mass.

The island was originally named Poocuohhunkkunnah (probably from the Wampanoag for "Point of departure" or "Land's end") by the native Wampanoag tribe. In 1602 English explorer Bartholomew Gosnold renamed the island. On March 6, 1602, Gosnold set out aboard the barque The Concord from Falmouth, England to plant a colony in the New World of America. Gosnold and his men landed near Kennebunkport, Maine, then explored Cape Cod, Martha's Vineyard, and Cuttyhunk. They established a modest fort on Cuttyhunk where they planned to harvest sassafras, a valuable commodity in Europe at the time. After exploring the islands for less than a month, the men returned with The Concord to England.

In 1606 the King granted the Elizabeth Islands to the Council of New England, which dissolved in 1635. After this, they became the property of William Alexander, 1st Earl of Stirling. Stirling sold the islands to Thomas Mayhew in 1641, and in 1663 James Stuart, Duke of York assumed proprietorship over them.

In 1668, Mayhew sold Cuttyhunk to Philip Smith, Peleg Sanford, and Thomas Ward of Newport, Rhode Island. In 1688, Peleg Sanford acquired his partners' rights in the island, and sold half of it to Ralph Earle of Dartmouth. He in turn immediately sold his property to his son, Ralph Jr., who became the island's first permanent English settler. He and other colonists harvested the island of all of its timber, leaving it bare and wind-swept.

In 1693, Peleg Slocum purchased all of the holdings on Cuttyhunk, and became its sole owner. The Slocum family continued to live on Cuttyhunk for the next one hundred sixty-five years. Several generations were slaveholders of Africans transported to the English colony for labor.

In 1858, William C.N. Swift, Thomas Nye, and Eben Perry bought Cuttyhunk from Otis Slocum for fifty dollars. In 1864, the town of Gosnold was finally incorporated.

=== 19th- and 20th-century timeline ===
- 1872–73 Cuttyhunk school was built
- 1874 First town meeting
- 1889 Town cemetery established
- 1892 Town library established
- 1976 WTG Energy Systems erected a prototype 200 kW wind turbine generator (windmill) to supply a portion of the island's electric power.

== Climate ==
Climate data for Cuttyhunk, MA
Month	Jan	Feb	Mar	Apr	May	Jun	Jul	Aug	Sep	Oct	Nov	Dec	Year
Record high °F (°C)	67 (19)	66 (19)	80 (27)	96 (36)	98 (37)	100 (38)	103 (39)	107 (42)	94 (34)	87 (31)	79 (26)	74 (23)	107 (42)
Mean daily maximum °F (°C)	37 (3)	39 (4)	46 (8)	56 (13)	67 (19)	77 (25)	83 (28)	82 (28)	74 (23)	63 (17)	52 (11)	42 (6)	60 (16)
Mean daily minimum °F (°C)	20 (−7)	22 (−6)	29 (−2)	38 (3)	48 (9)	58 (14)	65 (18)	65 (18)	57 (14)	46 (8)	37 (3)	26 (−3)	43 (6)
Record low °F (°C)	−8 (−22)	−6 (−21)	4 (−16)	16 (−9)	32 (0)	44 (7)	50 (10)	44 (7)	36 (2)	27 (−3)	11 (−12)	−5 (−21)	−8 (−22)
Average precipitation inches (mm)	4.69 (119)	4.01 (102)	4.68 (119)	4.37 (111)	3.69 (94)	3.95 (100)	3.54 (90)	4.55 (116)	3.89 (99)	3.97 (101)	4.66 (118)	4.77 (121)	50.77 (1,290)
Source: Intellicast

== Notable residents ==
- Paul Cuffe (1759–1817)

== Cuttyhunk Fishing Club ==
Cuttyhunk Fishing Club pictured in 2026.

In 1864, some members of The West Island Club in Sakonnet Point, Rhode Island grew dissatisfied with that club's regulations. They looked for a place to start their own fishing club. After a visit to Cuttyhunk, these powerful New York gentlemen decided they had found their spot. In 1865, they purchased a large portion of the island, and built 26 "fishing stands"—long, wooden platforms that stretched out from rock to rock into the surf—all around the island. They limited initial membership to fifty men, with a single negative vote of the active members sufficient to bar a man from membership. The admission fee was $300. Eventually, the membership was expanded to sixty, then seventy-five.

Each evening, the members of the Club met to draw lots to determine which fishing stand each would use the next day. Each member employed a "chummer"—a young boy paid to bait the member's hook with lobster tail, and cast chunks of lobster into the surf to attract striped bass. They paid the chummer $1 per fish caught, or more if the fish were particularly large. Records were kept of the number, size, and location of the fish caught, and by whom. Cuttyhunk gained a reputation for being a prime location for sportfishing, especially for striped bass.

The Cuttyhunk Fishing Club gave the Cuttyhunk Church the land to build on in 1880 (the Church celebrated its 125th anniversary in the summer of 2006). Every Fourth of July, the club would host a party for island residents, including fireworks displays. In 1921, William M. Wood bought out the Cuttyhunk Fishing Club's interest in the island, along with any other land that was for sale. He wanted a place for his young children to summer. He invited other young, wealthy couples who were his friends to purchase summer homes on the island, to provide playmates for his children. The Wood family owns a great deal of the island to this day. Descendants of many of the families who purchased property from Wood still summer on the island annually.

Both Presidents Teddy Roosevelt and William Taft were known to stay and fish out of the Cuttyhunk Fishing Club.

== Lighthouses, pilots and shipwrecks ==
The treacherous waters of the Vineyard Sound and Buzzards Bay were tricky for novices to navigate. Early on in the island's history, island men began to make a large part of their living piloting boats past the dangerous reefs and towards the ports of New Bedford, Providence, and Boston. Men stood atop Lookout Hill with spyglasses in hand, scanning the horizon for incoming whaling ships headed for New Bedford. When a ship appeared, the men would scramble down to the shore to their boats in a race to be the first to offer services as a pilot. In 1903, Cuttyhunk pilots guided as many as eleven ships a day to New Bedford harbor. The reefs were indeed dangerous. In 1847, the Massachusetts Humane Society established life-saving stations throughout the Elizabeth Islands, supplied with items needed by islanders to assist boats in trouble.

The lighthouse was decommissioned and torn down in 1947, replaced by a skeleton tower. The keeper's house was also destroyed. The tower that replaced the old light house is no longer functional. The only surviving structure from the lighthouse station is a stone oil house, and its door and roof are missing.

=== Notable shipwrecks ===
- February 24, 1893 – The brig Aquatic was wrecked off Sow and Pigs reef on the West End of Cuttyhunk. In that disaster, five Cuttyhunk lifesavers were killed at sea while trying to save the ship's passengers and crew.
- November 27, 1898 – The passenger and freight steamer Fairfax was wrecked off Sow and Pigs reef in the midst of the infamous Portland Gale, during which it is estimated over 150 ships and 400 lives were lost. Despite the intensity of the storm, all passengers (6) and crew landed safely.
- August 26, 1924 – The whaleship Wanderer, the last such ship to leave New Bedford. She put to sea on August 25, 1924 and anchored near Cuttyhunk to await the completion of her crew. The next morning, the seas rose and the Wanderer dragged her anchors, drifting toward Sow and Pigs. As the anchor chains snapped, the crew knew the ship was lost and abandoned it in two whaleboats. Cuttyhunk lifesavers set to sea to help the men make it to shore, but by the time they reached the area, the two boats had disappeared. One boat made it to Cuttyhunk, and the other to the Vineyard Sound lightship.

Years later, the grinding stone from the Wanderer, which had been found prior, year unknown, was found propping up the old stairs that lead to the Cuttyhunk Corner Store. Once discovered under the steps it was set into the new floor of the gift shop, and can be seen front and center as one enters the gift shop. There is a clear engraving on the circular stone that reads Wanderer.

- In August 1992, the Cunard Lines ocean liner, Queen Elizabeth 2 badly damaged her hull by running aground on a previously uncharted shoal about 2.5 miles (4.0 km) south southwest of Cuttyhunk. The ship suffered $13.2 million in damage, and the company lost $50 million when the ship was out of commission.

== Population and culture ==
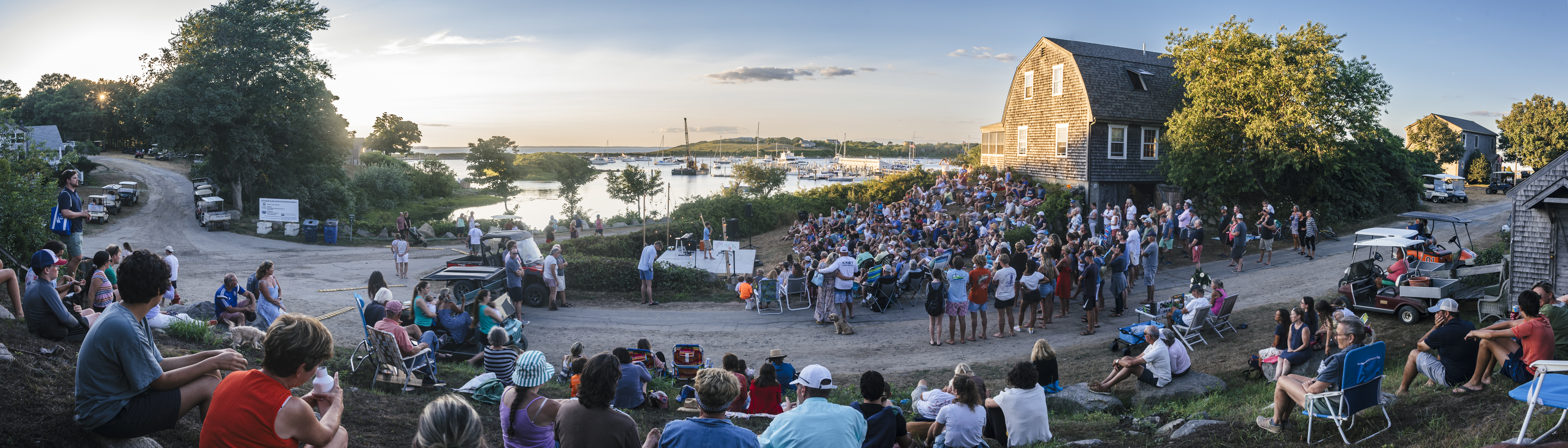
Cuttyhunk summer and year-round residents attending the annual talent show

Cuttyhunk is part of the town of Gosnold, Massachusetts and home to 10 year-round residents. The town's population swells to about 400 in the summer with vacationers and boaters. Cuttyhunk has a few trucks, but most people travel on foot or by golf cart. Cuttyhunk's natural harbor is a popular spot for boaters to tie up for a night or even a summer.

Cuttyhunk continues to be a popular site for sportfishing, with striped bass and bluefish being the most frequent catches. Lobstering is an occupation for a few of the island's residents, as is boat building, shellfishing, and carpentry. The island is served by a ferry named the M/V Cuttyhunk, which makes frequent trips to Cuttyhunk from New Bedford during the summer.

There is one bed and breakfast - the Cuttyhunk Fishing Club - and many home rentals for summer tourists, but given its small size, other facilities on the island are limited, with three retail stores and only a few spots for lunch or dinner.

The single school on the island had one teacher and three students as of August 2009; in June 2019, eighth grader Gwen Lynch graduated as the sole member of the Class of 2019. Her commencement speech was held by actress and comedienne Jenny Slate. The school reopened as a STEAM Academy, offering seminar-style programs in lieu of having full-time students on-island.

== In popular culture ==
- The New England social critic Edward Everett Hale in a lecture in 1903 suggested that Cuttyhunk Island, rather than Roanoke Island in North Carolina, is the setting for William Shakespeare's play The Tempest. Such theories are based more on folklore and supposition than historic documentation.
- On June 24, 2005, Cuttyhunk was the last stop of the Boston Red Sox World Series Trophy tour.
- The island is the subject of a song in William Finn's musical A New Brain. The song is entitled "Sitting Becalmed in the Lee of Cuttyhunk".

== Gallery ==
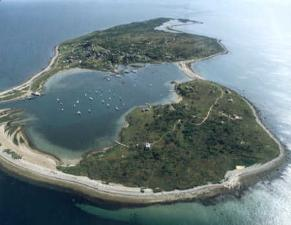
Aerial image from 2005

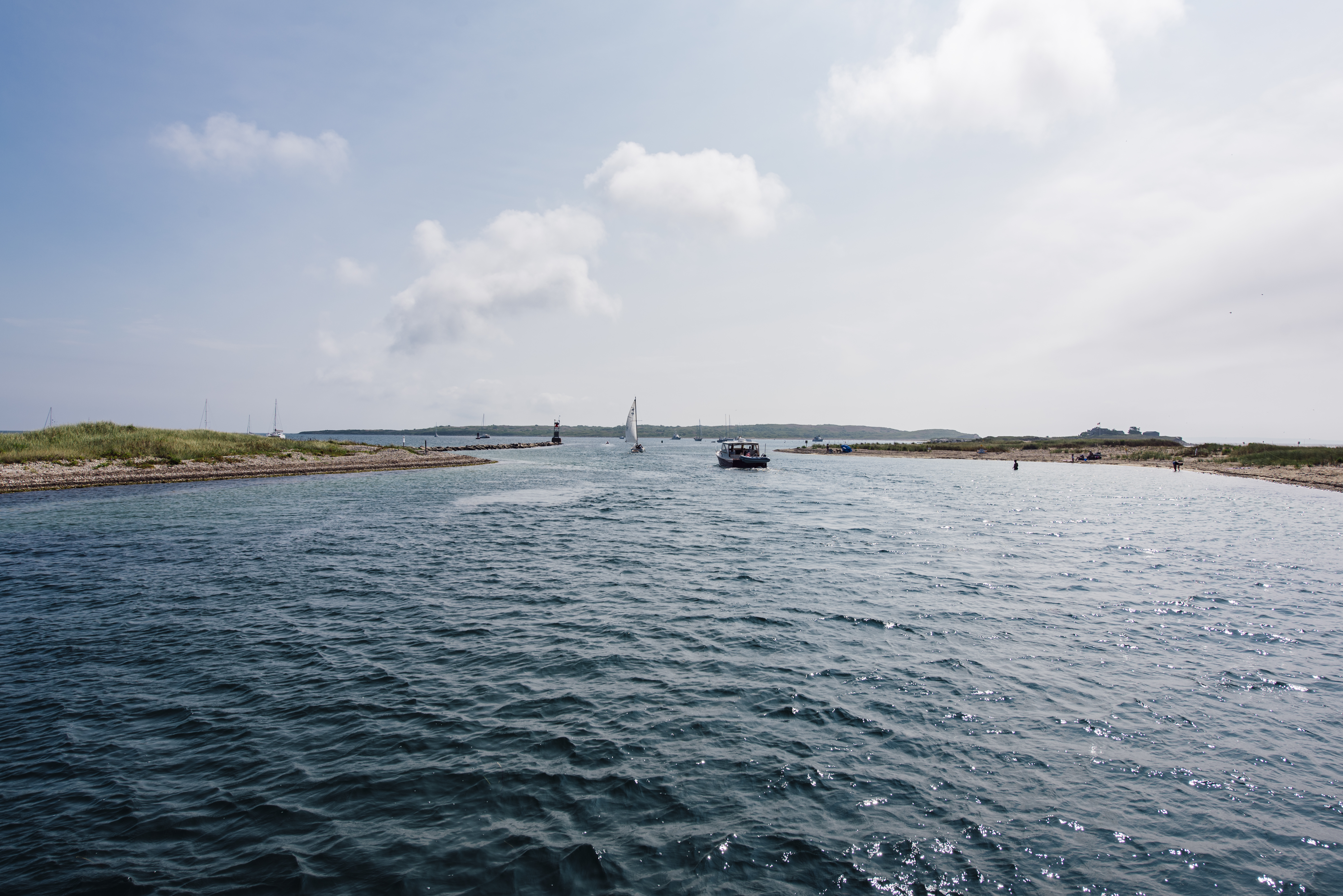
Entering Cuttyhunk Harbor

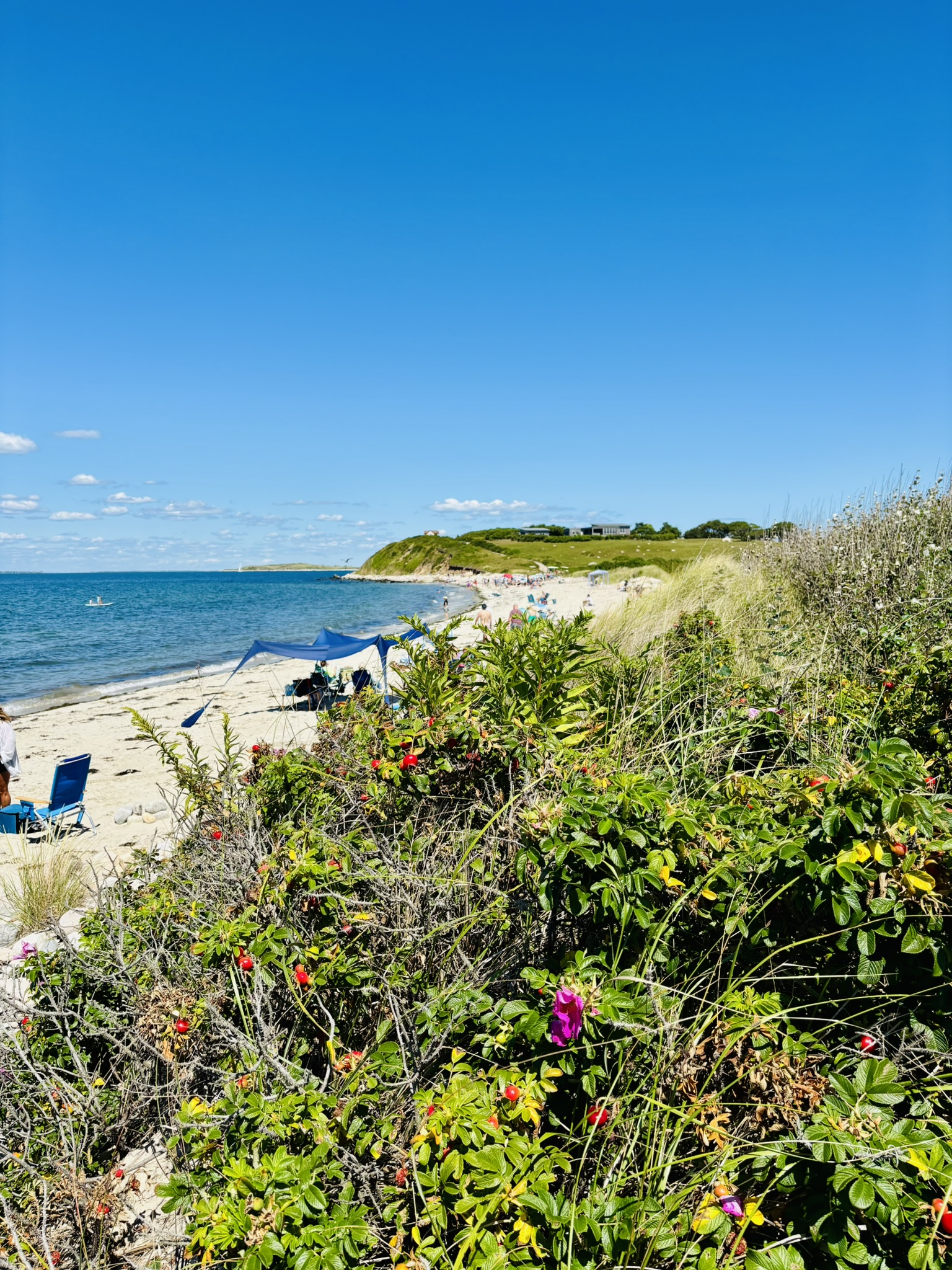
Church's Beach

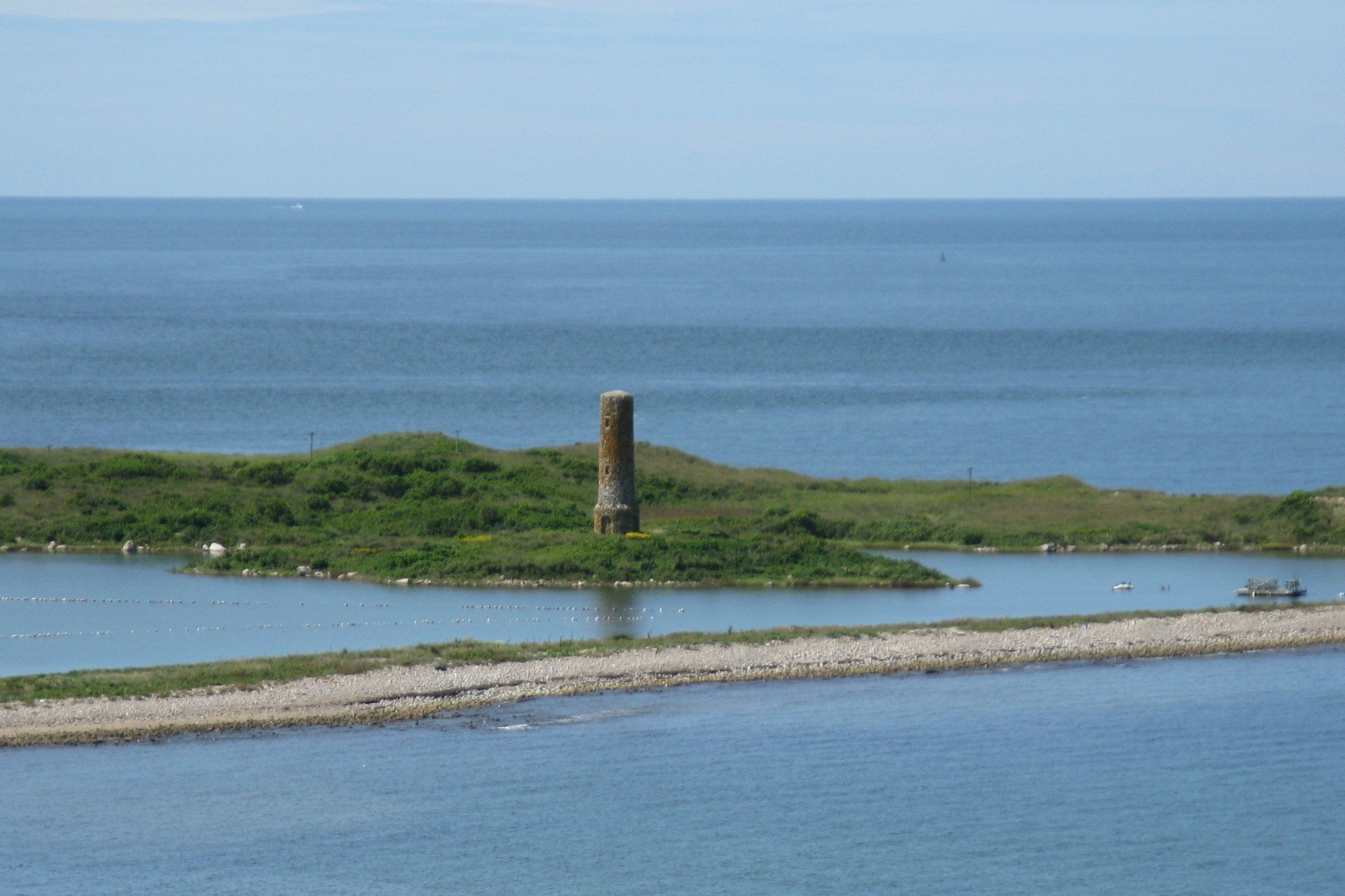
Bartholomew Gosnold Monument

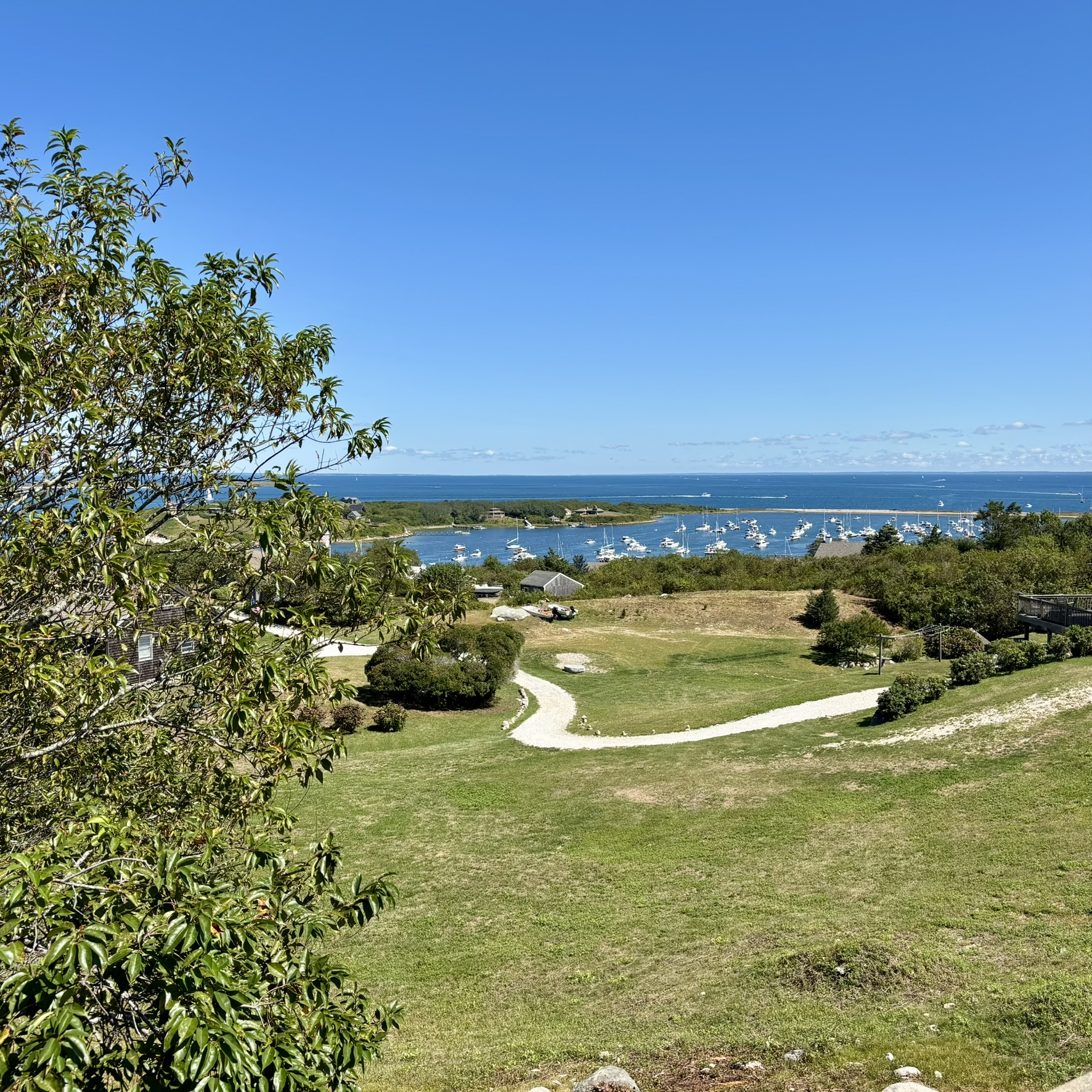
The road down to the ferry from the Cuttyhunk Fishing Club

== Sources ==
- Haskell, Louise T. (1953). The Story of Cuttyhunk (PDF). New Bedford, Mass.: Waterford Printing. OCLC 3880756.
- Cuttyhunk and the Elizabeth Islands from 1602, Bosworth Cuttyhunk Historical Society | Book Special
- Lighthouses of Cape Cod, Martha's Vineyard, Nantucket – Their History and Lore, Clark
- The Lighthouses of New England, Snow
- Massachusetts Lighthouses – A Pictorial Guide, Thompson
- Lighthouses and Life Saving Stations Along the Massachusetts Coast, Claflin
- Office of the Light House Board, List of Lights and Fog Signals on the Atlantic and Gulf Coasts of the United States, GPO
- "Lighthouses", Smithsonian Museum of American History NMAH | Lighthouse Postcards | Cuttyhunk lighthouse
