= Boston Harbor =

Estuary and harbor of Massachusetts Bay

Coordinates: 42°20′30″N 70°57′58″W

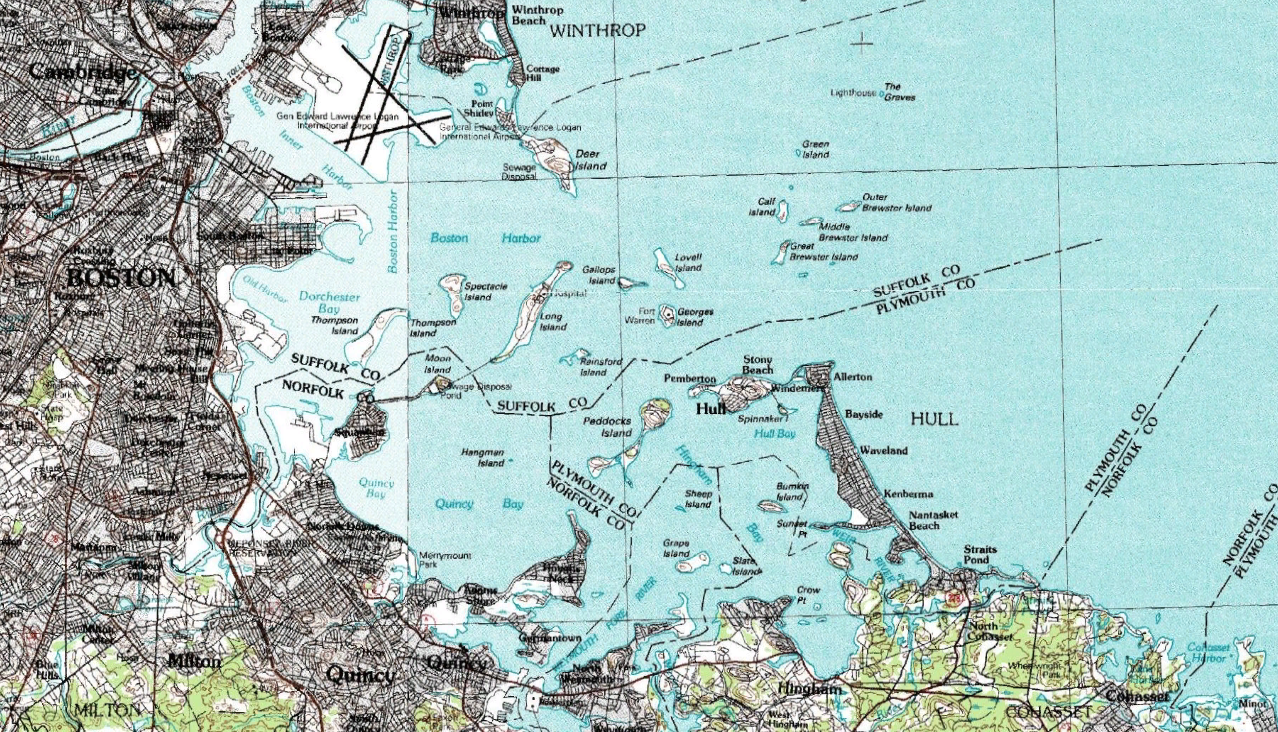
Topographic map of Boston Harbor

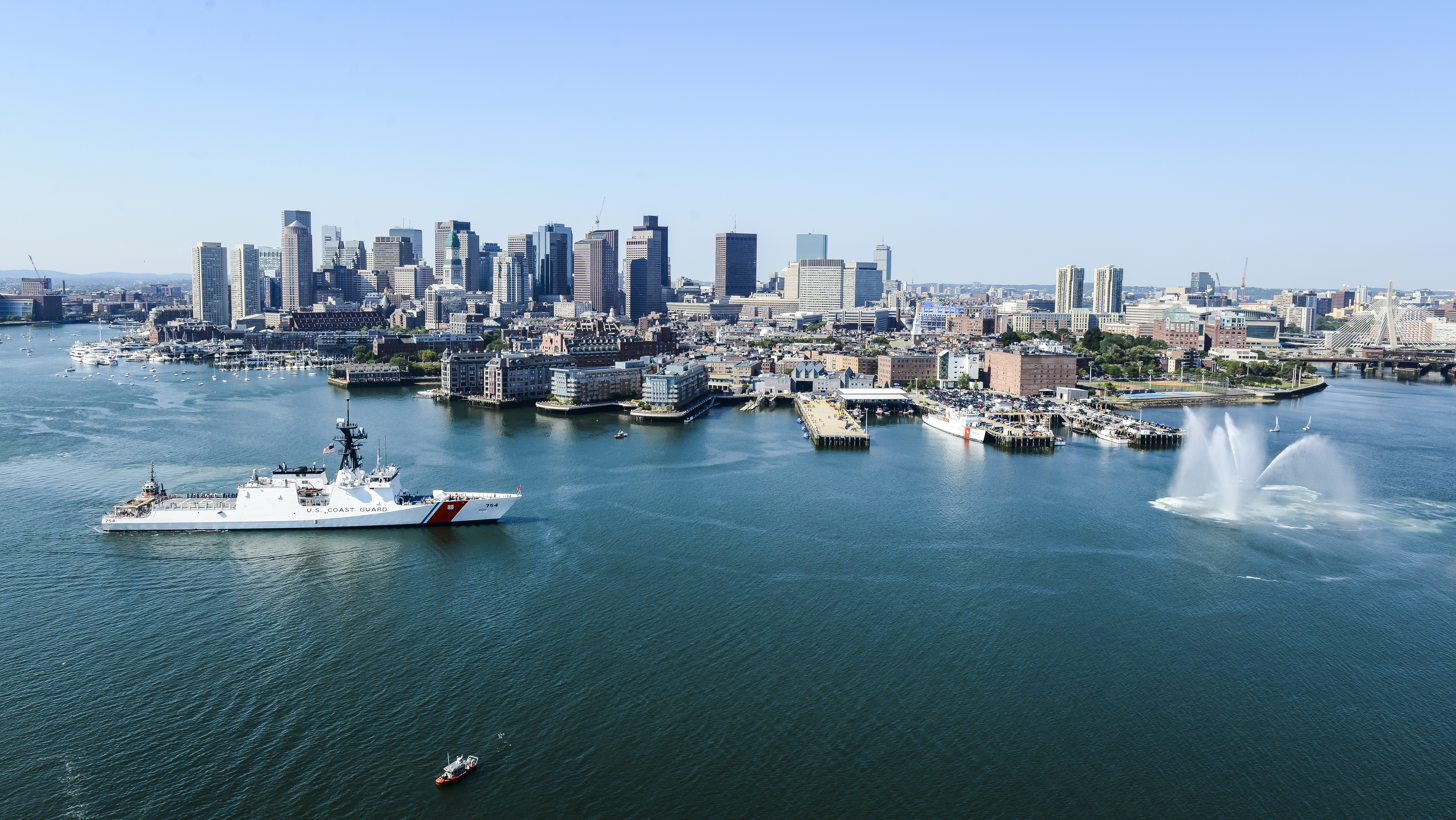
USCGC James pulls into Harbor in August 2015

Boston Harbor is a natural harbor and estuary of Massachusetts Bay, located adjacent to Boston, Massachusetts. It is home to the Port of Boston, a major shipping facility in the Northeastern United States.

The harbor was the site of the Boston Tea Party, a major 1773 event in the American Revolution.

== History ==
=== Before colonization ===
Boston Harbor was inhabited for thousands of years prior to European colonization of the Americas, with some of the earliest human remains in the Boston area found on Peddocks Island, dated to more than 4000 years before present. At the time of colonization, Moswetuset Hummock on the peninsula of Squantum was an important seat of the Massachusett leader Chickatawbut.

=== 17th century ===
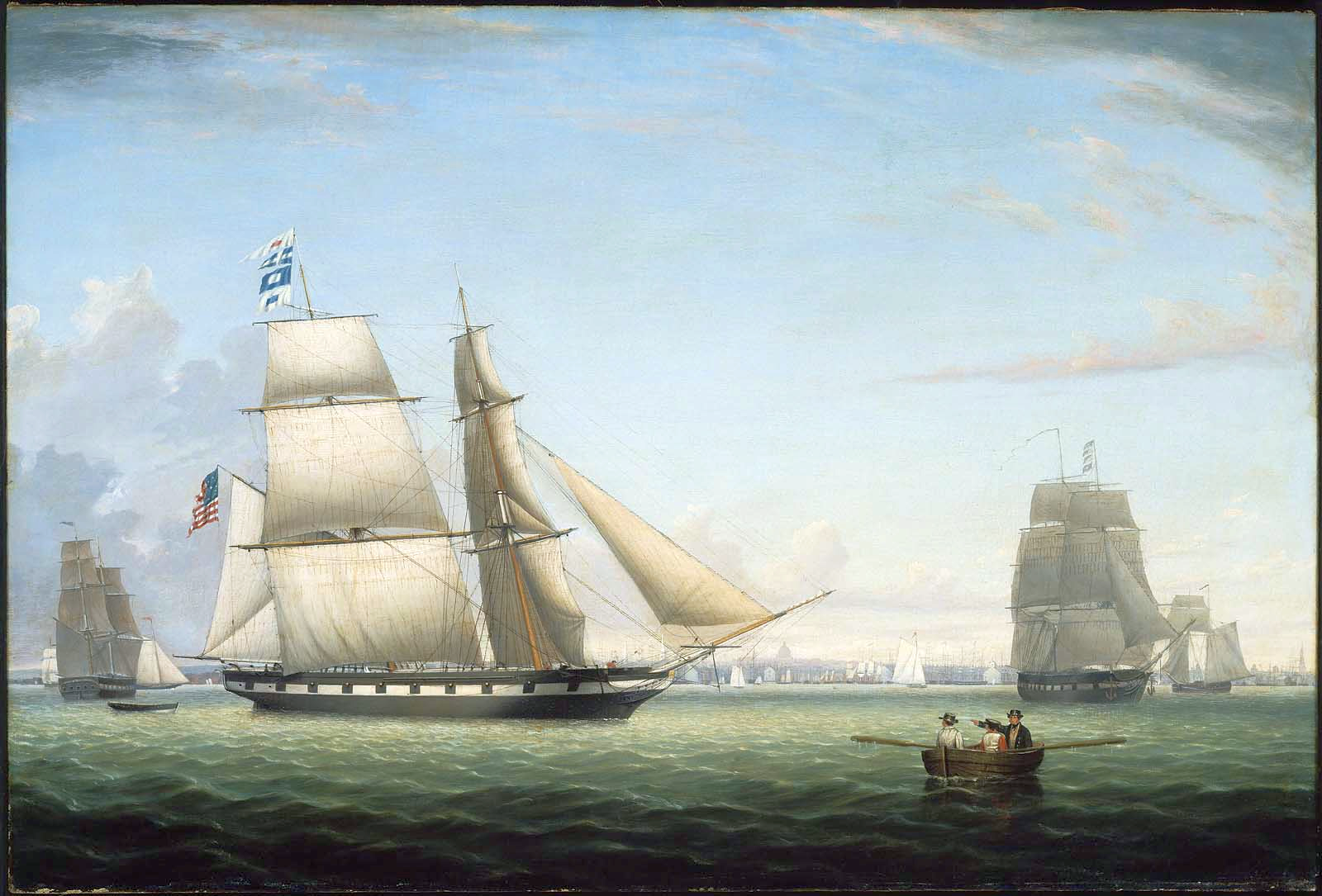
The Brig Antelope in Boston Harbor, an 1863 painting by Fitz Henry Lane now housed at the Museum of Fine Arts in Boston

Since it was first described by Europeans by John Smith in 1614, Boston Harbor has been an important port in American history. Boston Harbor was recognized by Europeans as one of the finest natural harbors in the world due to its depth and natural defense from the Atlantic as a result of the many islands that dot the harbor. It was also favored due to its access to the Charles River, Neponset River, and Mystic River, which made travel from the harbor deeper into Massachusetts far easier.

By 1660, almost all imports came to the greater Boston area and the New England coast through the waters of Boston Harbor. A rapid influx of people transformed Boston into an exploding city.

=== 18th century ===
Rear Admiral John Montagu, Boston, December 16, 1772 reports three frigates are stationed there to protect each of the harbour's three passages.

On December 16, 1773, Boston Harbor was the site of the Boston Tea Party, an iconic development in the American Revolution.

=== 19th century ===
Through the 19th century, Boston Harbor underwent extensive construction and development, including the building of wharves, piers, and new filled land into the harbor. In the late 19th century, Boston citizens were advised not to swim in any portion of the harbor. Two of the first steam sewage stations were built, with one in East Boston and one later on Deer Island. With these mandates, the harbor was seeing small improvements, but raw sewage was still continuously pumped into the harbor.

=== 20th century ===
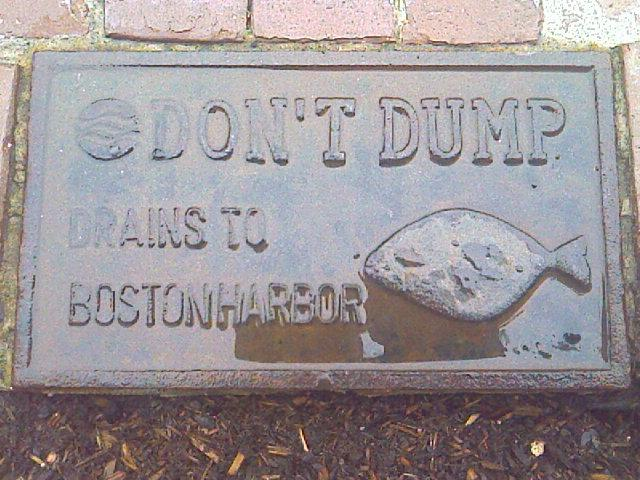
Signage on the streets of Boston

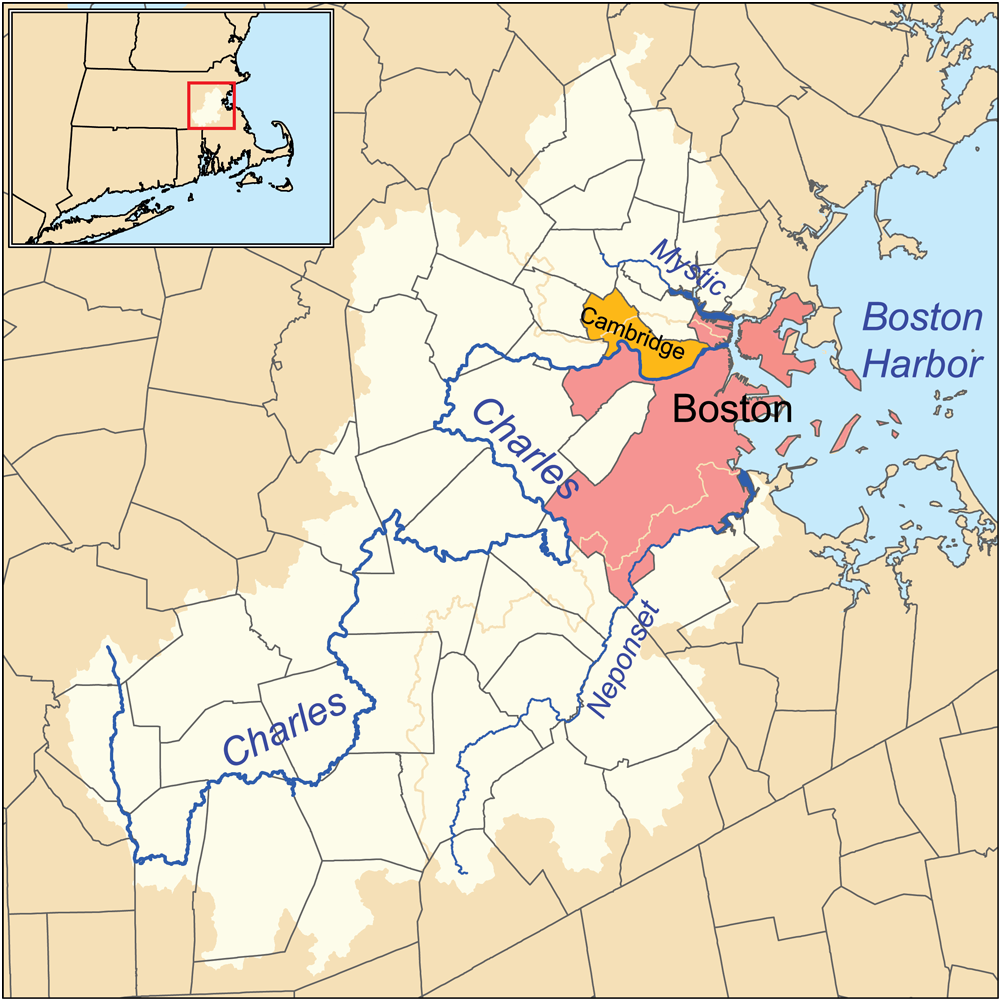
The Charles, Mystic, and Neponset rivers, which each empty into Boston Harbor

In 1919, the Metropolitan District Commission was created to oversee and regulate the quality of harbor water. However, not much improvement was seen and general public awareness of the poor quality of water was very low. In 1972, the Clean Water Act was passed in order to help promote increased national water quality.

Since the mid-1970s organizations within the Boston community have battled for a cleaner Boston Harbor. More recently, the harbor was the site of the $4.5 billion Boston Harbor Project. Failures at the Nut Island sewage treatment plant in Quincy and the companion Deer Island plant adjacent to Winthrop had far-reaching environmental and political effects. Fecal coliform bacteria levels forced frequent swimming prohibitions along the harbor beaches and the Charles River for many years.

In 1982, Quincy, Massachusetts sued the Metropolitan District Commission (MDC) and the separate Boston Water and Sewer Commission in 1982, charging that unchecked systemic pollution of the city's waterfront contributed to the problem. That suit was followed by one by Conservation Law Foundation and finally by the United States government, resulting in the landmark court-ordered cleanup of Boston Harbor.

The lawsuits forced then-Massachusetts Governor Michael Dukakis to propose separating the water and sewer treatment divisions from the MDC, resulting in the creation of the Massachusetts Water Resources Authority in 1985. The slow progress of the cleanup became a key theme of the 1988 U.S. presidential election as George H. W. Bush defeated Dukakis partly through campaign speeches casting doubt on the governor's environmental record, which Dukakis himself had claimed was better than that of Bush. The court-ordered cleanup continued throughout the next two decades and is still ongoing.

Before the cleanup projects, the water's pollution gained notability in popular culture when The Standells released their 1965 song, "Dirty Water", which referred to the state of the Charles River. Neal Stephenson, who attended Boston University from 1977 to 1981, based his second novel, Zodiac, around pollution of Boston Harbor.

Since the writing of the song, the water quality in both the harbor and the Charles River has significantly improved, and the projects have dramatically transformed Boston Harbor from one of the filthiest in the nation to one of the cleanest. Today, Boston Harbor is safe for fishing and for swimming nearly every day, though there are still beach closings after even small rainstorms, caused by bacteria-laden storm water and the occasional combined sewer overflow.

=== 21st century ===
In 2022, pieces of plastic transmission line used in rock explosives, known as explosive shock tubing, began washing up on coastal shores of Cape Cod and Rhode Island. This led to an investigation that was conducted by the U.S. Army Corps of Engineers, it was suspected to have been related to a concluded Boston Harbor dredging project. The outcome was to seek to find methods to prevent future environmental impacts from reoccurring.

== Geography ==
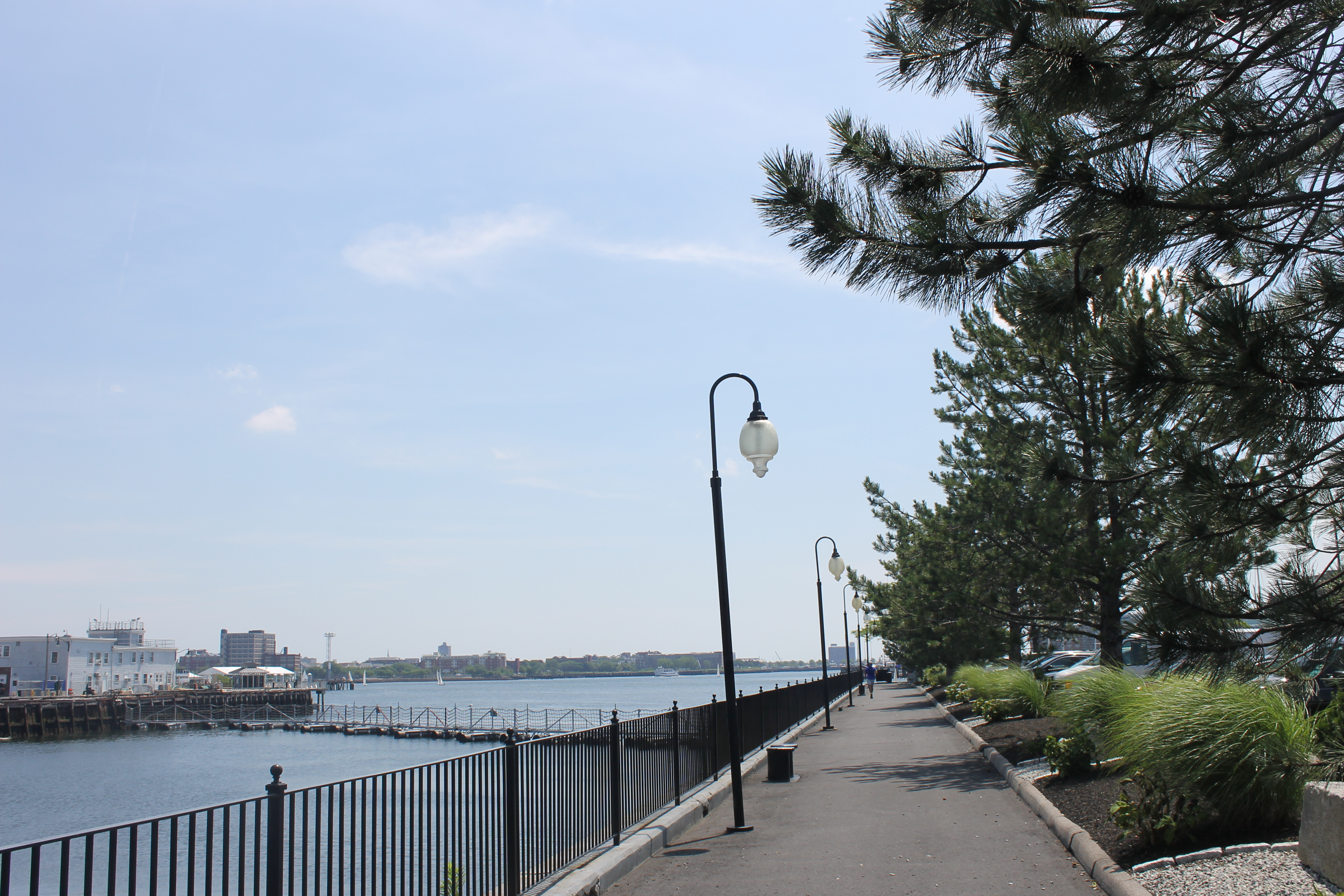
A section of the Boston Harborwalk

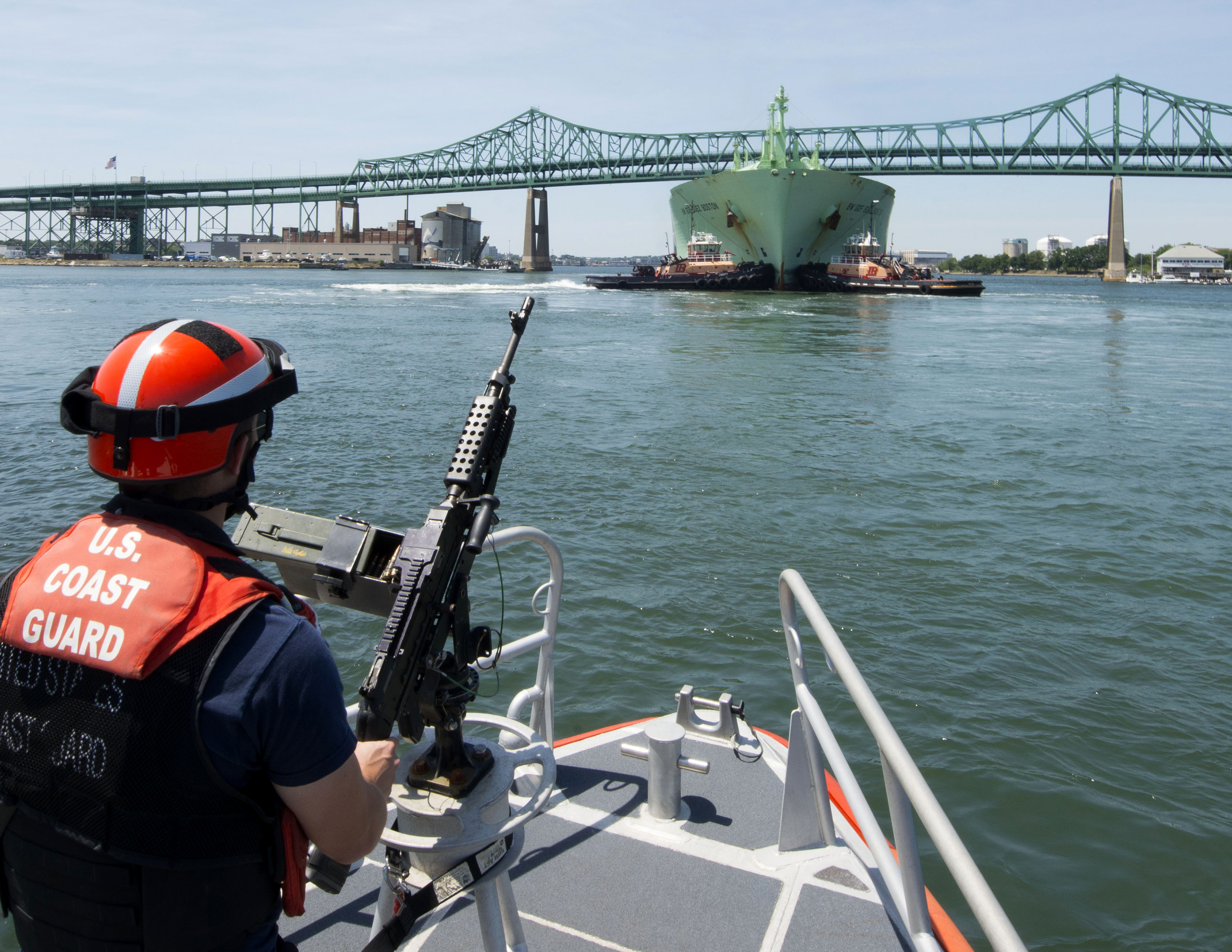
U.S. Coast Guard escorts an LNG tanker in Boston Harbor in 2016

Boston Harbor is a large harbor, which constitutes the western extremity of Massachusetts Bay. The harbor is sheltered from Massachusetts Bay and the open Atlantic Ocean by a combination of the Winthrop Peninsula and Deer Island to the north, the hooked Nantasket Peninsula and Point Allerton to the south, and the harbor islands in the middle. The harbor is often described as being split into an inner harbor and an outer harbor. The harbor itself comprises 50 square miles (130 km^{2}) with 180 miles (290 km) of shoreline and 34 harbor islands.

=== Inner Harbor ===
The inner harbor was historically the main port of Boston and is still the site of most of its port facilities as well as the Boston waterfront, which has been redeveloped for residential and recreational uses. The inner harbor extends from the mouths of the Charles River and the Mystic River, both of which empty into the harbor, to Logan International Airport and Castle Island, the latter now connected by land in 1928 to Boston, where the inner harbor meets the outer harbor.

=== Outer Harbor ===
The outer harbor stretches to the south and east of the inner harbor. To its landward side, and moving in a counterclockwise direction, the harbor is made up of the three small bays of Dorchester Bay, Quincy Bay and Hingham Bay. To seaward, the two deep water anchorages of President Roads and Nantasket Roads are separated by Long Island. The outer harbor is fed by several rivers, including the Neponset River, the Weymouth Fore River, the Weymouth Back River and the Weir River.

Dredged deep water channels stretch from President Roads to the inner harbor, and from Nantasket Roads to the Weymouth Fore River and Hingham Bay via Hull Gut and West Gut. Some commercial port facilities are located in the Fore River area, an area which has a history of shipbuilding including the notable Fore River Shipyard.

=== Land fill ===
In the 1830s, members of the maritime community observed physical decay in the harbor. Islands in the outer harbor were visibly deteriorating and erosion was causing weathered materials and sediment to move from where it was protecting the harbor to where it would do the most harm. Recent shoaling experiences and comparisons with old charts caused observers to insist that the inner harbor was also filling and created widespread anxiety about the destruction of the Boston Harbor. Although the scientific understanding of hydraulics was still in its infancy and there were high degrees of uncertainty regarding the meeting of land and water, scientists and engineers began to describe the Boston Harbor as a series of channels created and maintained by the scouring force of water moving in and out of the harbor, river systems, and tidal reservoirs. This interpretation came to be known as the theory of Tidal scour. This understanding of the harbor as a dynamic landscape assuaged concerns some had over the negative impacts of land fill operations of land and real estate developers.

As the 19th century progressed, the acceleration of urban growth dramatically increased the need for more land. The Ordinance of 1641 extended the property rights of riparian owners from the line of low tide to a maximum distance of 100 rods (1,600 ft; 500 m) from the line of high tide. Generally, other states drew the line of private property at high tide. However, extending shore lines into bordering bodies of water was not unique to Boston. Chicago built into Lake Michigan, New York extended itself into the Hudson and East rivers, and San Francisco reclaimed sections of its bay. The Boston Harbor's unique geography inspired the law that made land reclamation such a widespread activity in Boston. By the end of the nineteenth century, the city had created more land in two generations than it had in the previous two centuries.

=== Harbor Islands ===
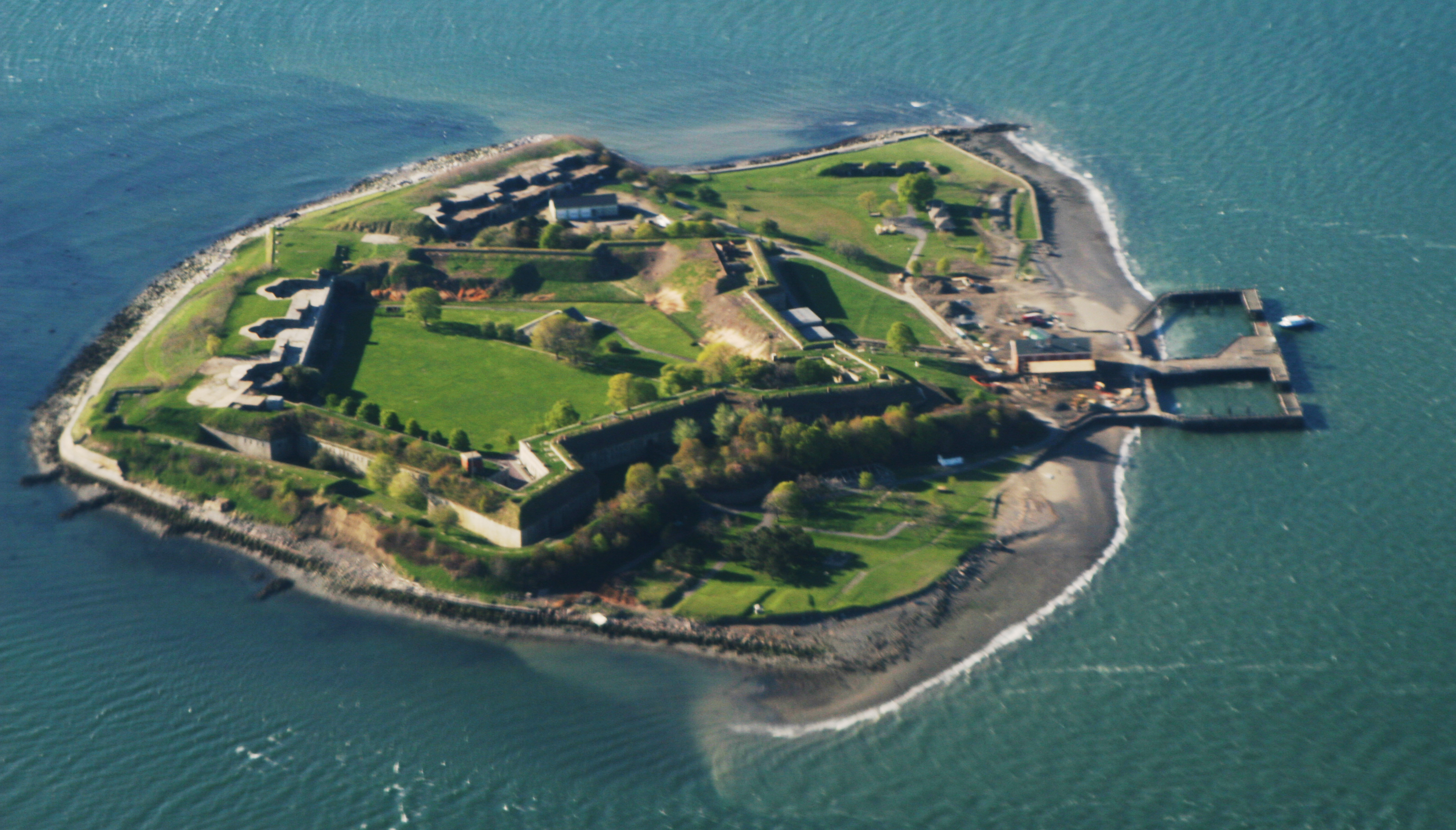
Georges Island, with star-shaped Fort Warren

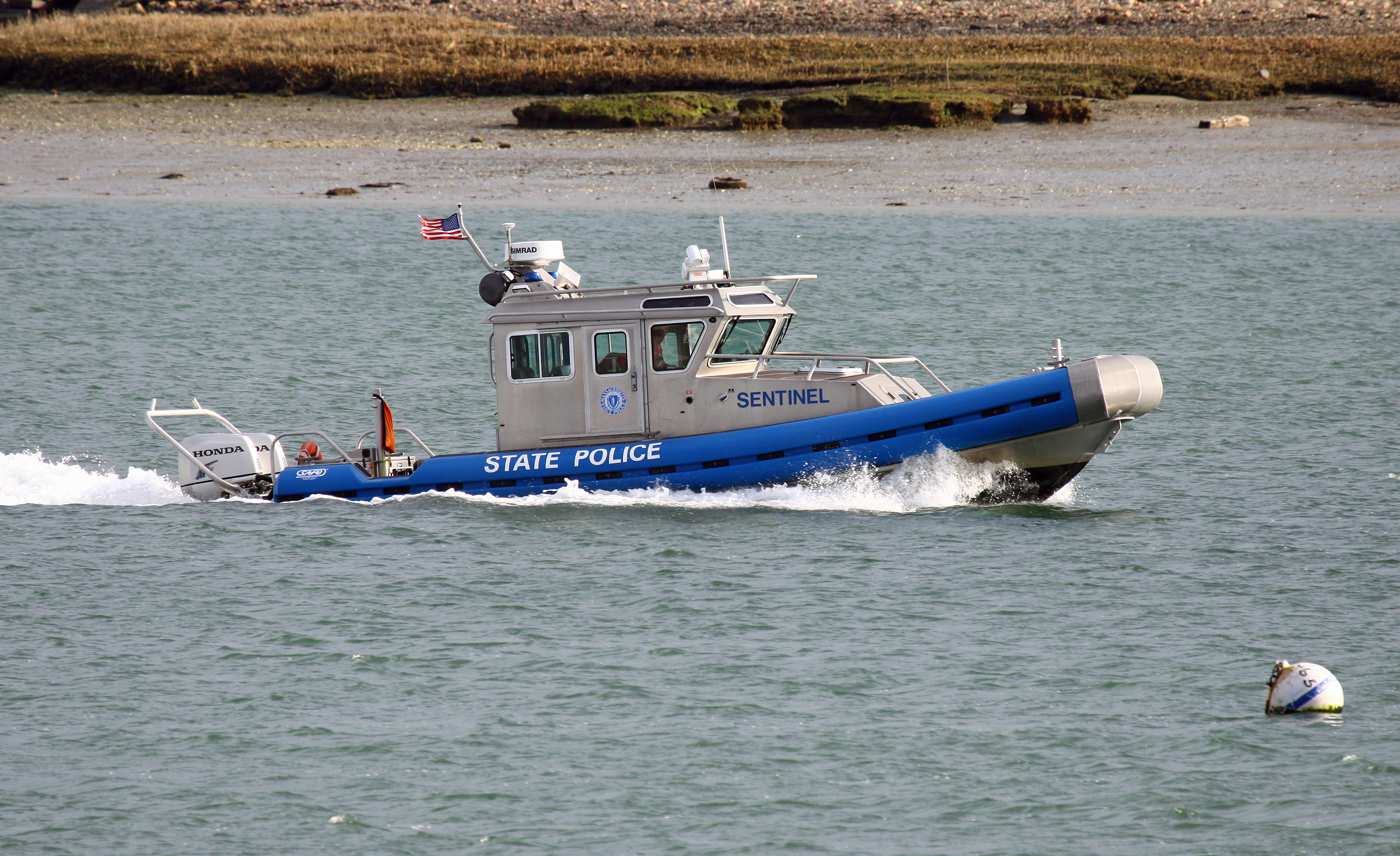
State Police inflatable patrols off Logan International Airport

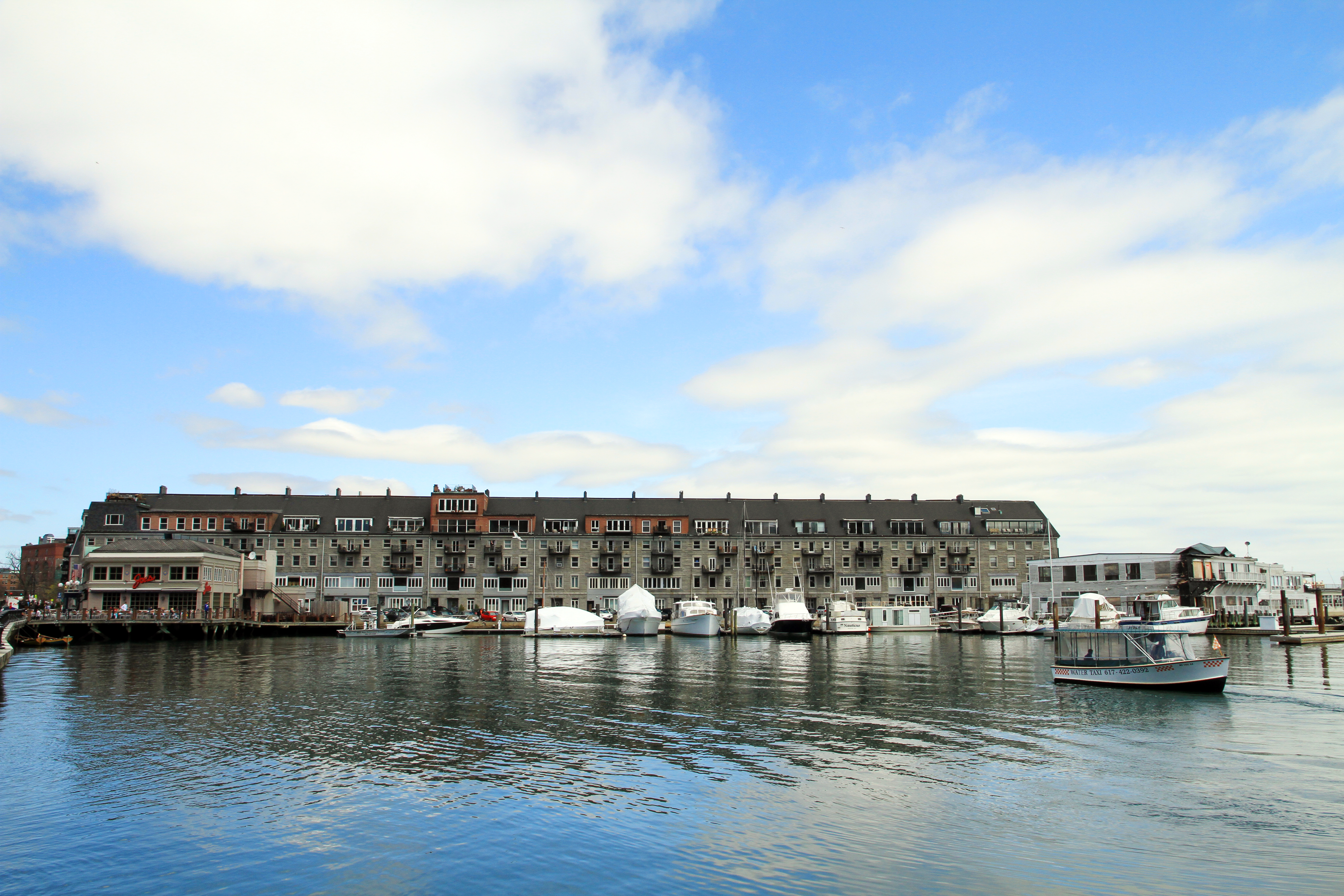
Former warehouse repurposed as housing and a restaurant, on Commercial Wharf near Atlantic Avenue

Boston Harbor contains a considerable number of islands, 34 of which have been part of the Boston Harbor Islands National Recreation Area since its establishment in 1996. The following islands exist within the harbor, or just outside it in Massachusetts Bay:

- Bumpkin Island
- Button Island
- Calf Island
- Castle Island
- Deer Island
- Gallops Island
- Georges Island
- Grape Island
- Great Brewster Island
- Green Island
- Hangman Island
- Langlee Island
- Little Brewster Island
- Little Calf Island
- Long Island
- Lovells Island
- Middle Brewster Island
- Moon Island
- Nixes Mate
- Outer Brewster Island
- Peddocks Island
- Raccoon Island
- Ragged Island
- Rainsford Island
- Sarah Island
- Shag Rocks
- Sheep Island
- Slate Island
- Snake Island
- Spectacle Island
- Spinnaker Island
- The Graves
- Thompson Island

Two former islands, Castle Island and Deer Island, still exist in a recognizable form. Castle Island was joined to the mainland by land reclamation, while Deer Island ceased to be an island when the channel which formerly separated it from the mainland was filled in by the New England Hurricane of 1938.

Nut Island is a small former island in Boston Harbor that was joined by landfill to the Houghs Neck peninsula in northeastern Quincy by the 1940s so it could be used as the site of a sewage treatment facility.

Two other former islands, Apple Island and Governors Island, have been subsumed into land reclamation for Logan International Airport.

The Harbor Islands have made up Boston's least populated electoral area, Ward 1, Precinct 15, since 1990, though the polling place is on the mainland at Columbia Point. Since 1920, Boston must pass legislation to redistrict. As of 2018, there were two active voters, staff at the Thompson Island Outward Bound Educational Center. There were previously registered voters at a recovery center and a homeless shelter on Long Island, but few voted and they have closed.

=== Aquaculture ===
In 1996, The Boston Globe reported that Mayor Thomas Menino and MIT engineer Clifford Goudey were planning a program to use the great tanks on Moon Island as a fish farm or a temporary home for tuna or lobster in an attempt to implement a recirculating aquaculture system in Boston Harbor. The prices of both these fish types vary by season. The plan was to collect and store fish in the tanks and sell the fish at higher prices when they were out of season. Nothing has come of this plan to date.

== Lights and other aids to navigation ==
- Boston Light
- Deer Island Light
- Egg Rock Light
- Long Island Head Light
- Lovells Island Range Lights
- Nixes Mate
- Spectacle Island Range Lights
- The Graves Light

== Images ==
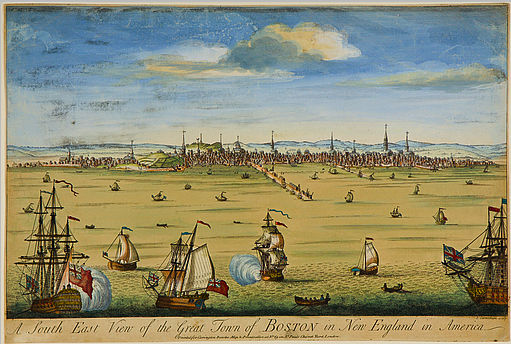
South East View of the Great Town of Boston, by John Carwitham, c. 1765

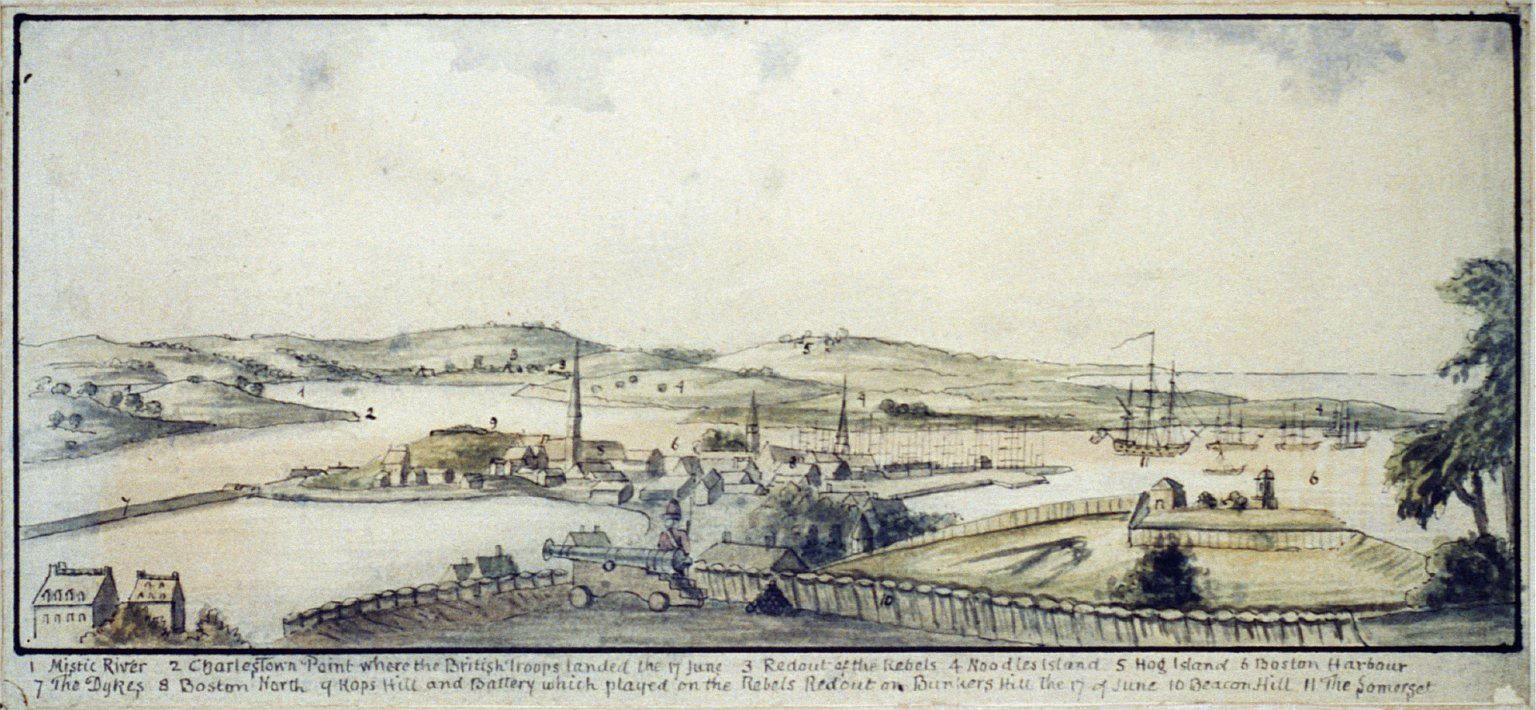
View from Beacon Hill, c. 1770s (Library of Congress Prints and Photographs Division Washington)

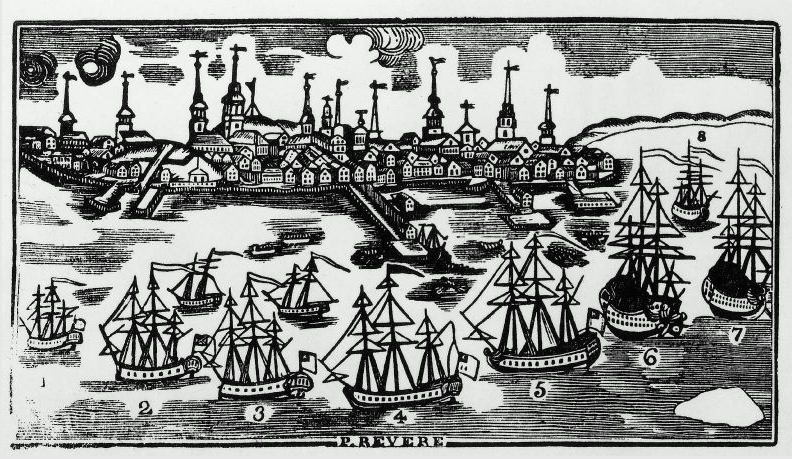
Boston Harbor, c. 18th century, by Nathaniel Dearborn after Paul Revere (Museum of Fine Arts, Boston)

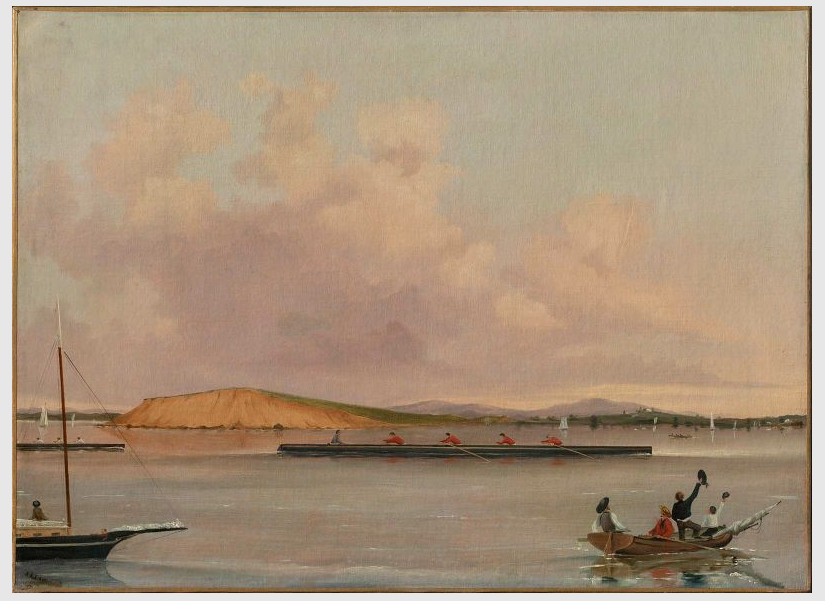
Boat Race, Boston Harbor, by A. A. Lawrence, 1852 (Museum of Fine Arts, Boston)

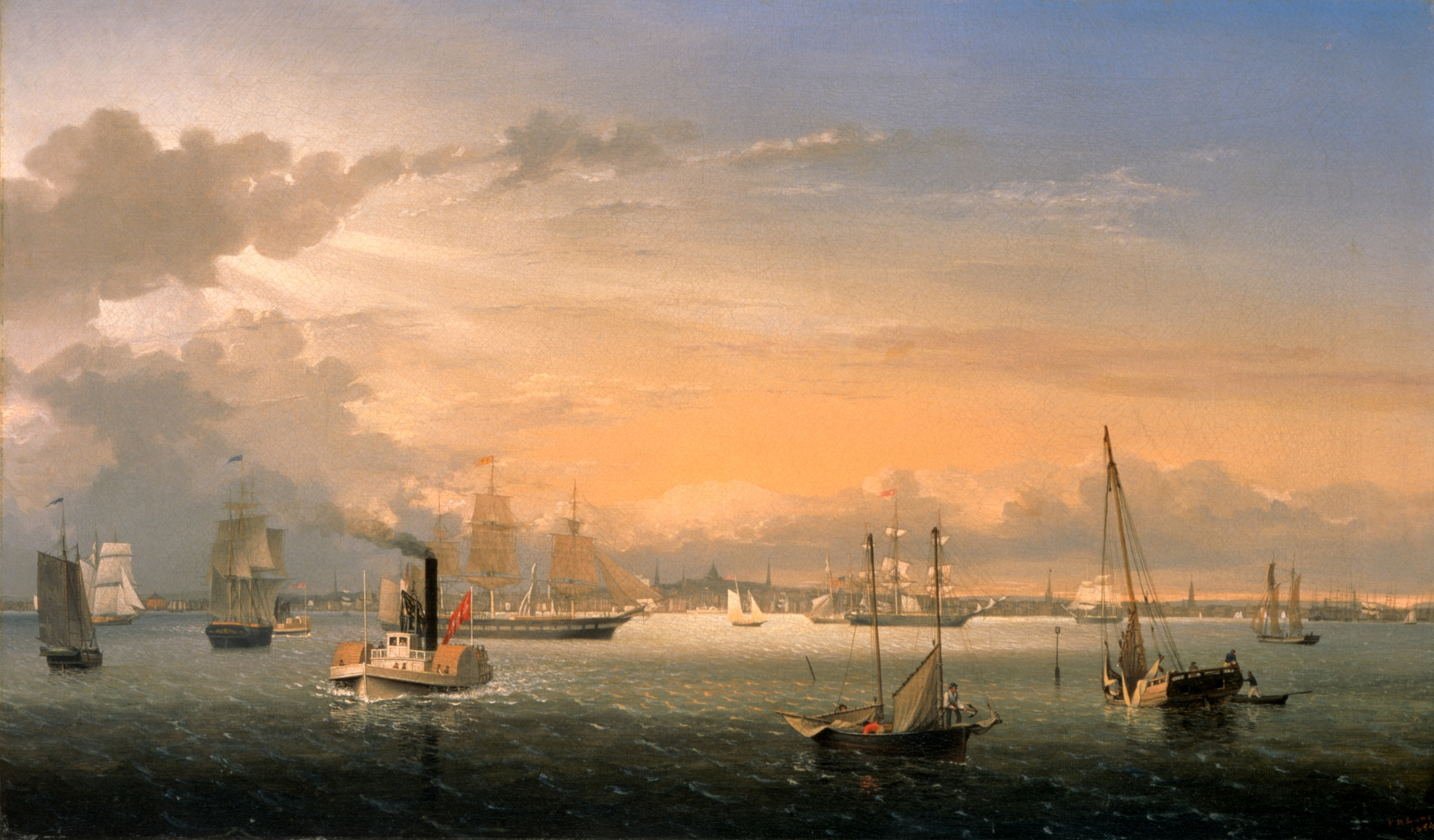
Boston Harbor by Fitz Hugh Lane, 1854

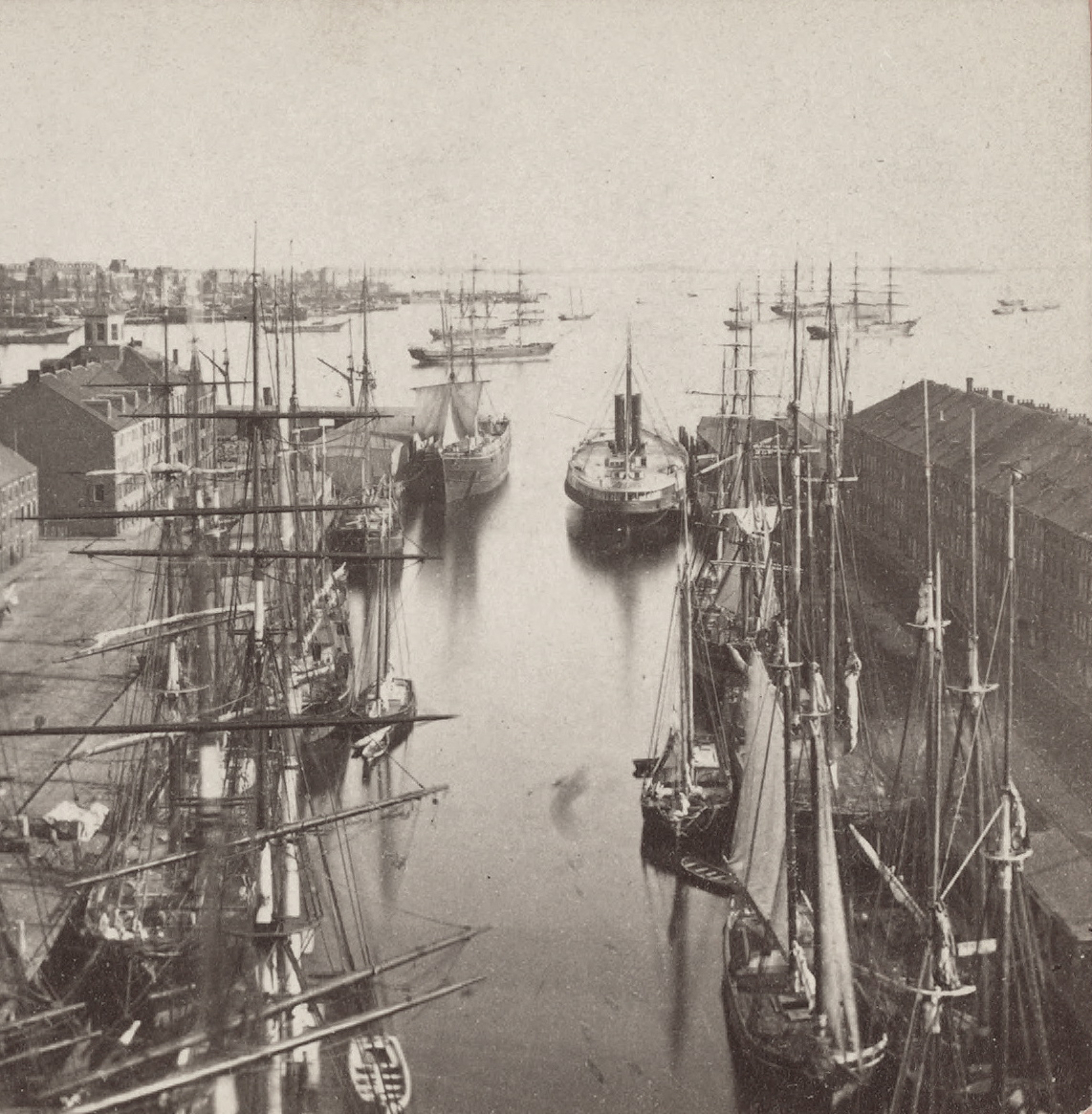
Boston harbor and East Boston from State Street Block, by John P. Soule, 19th century

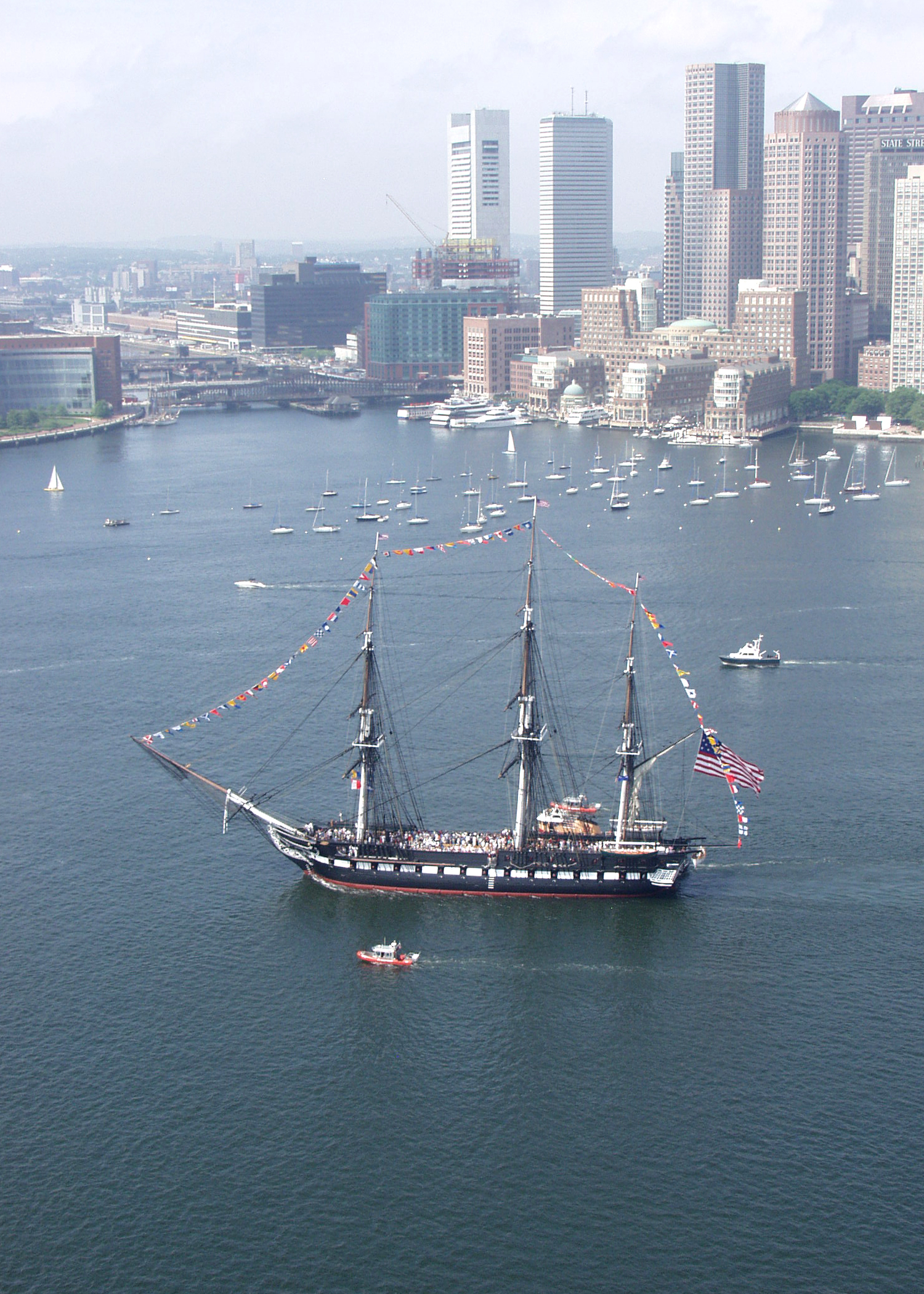
USS Constitution, 2005

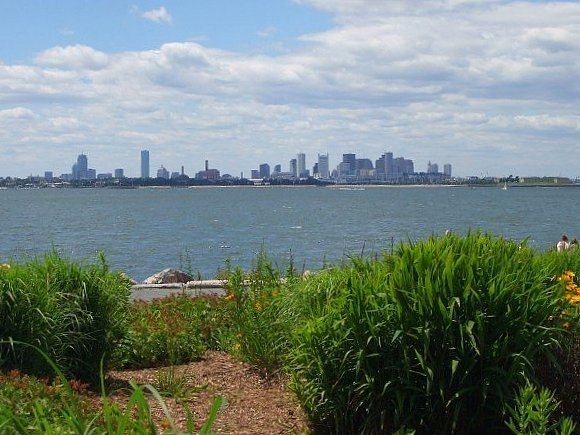
Boston's skyline from Spectacle Island

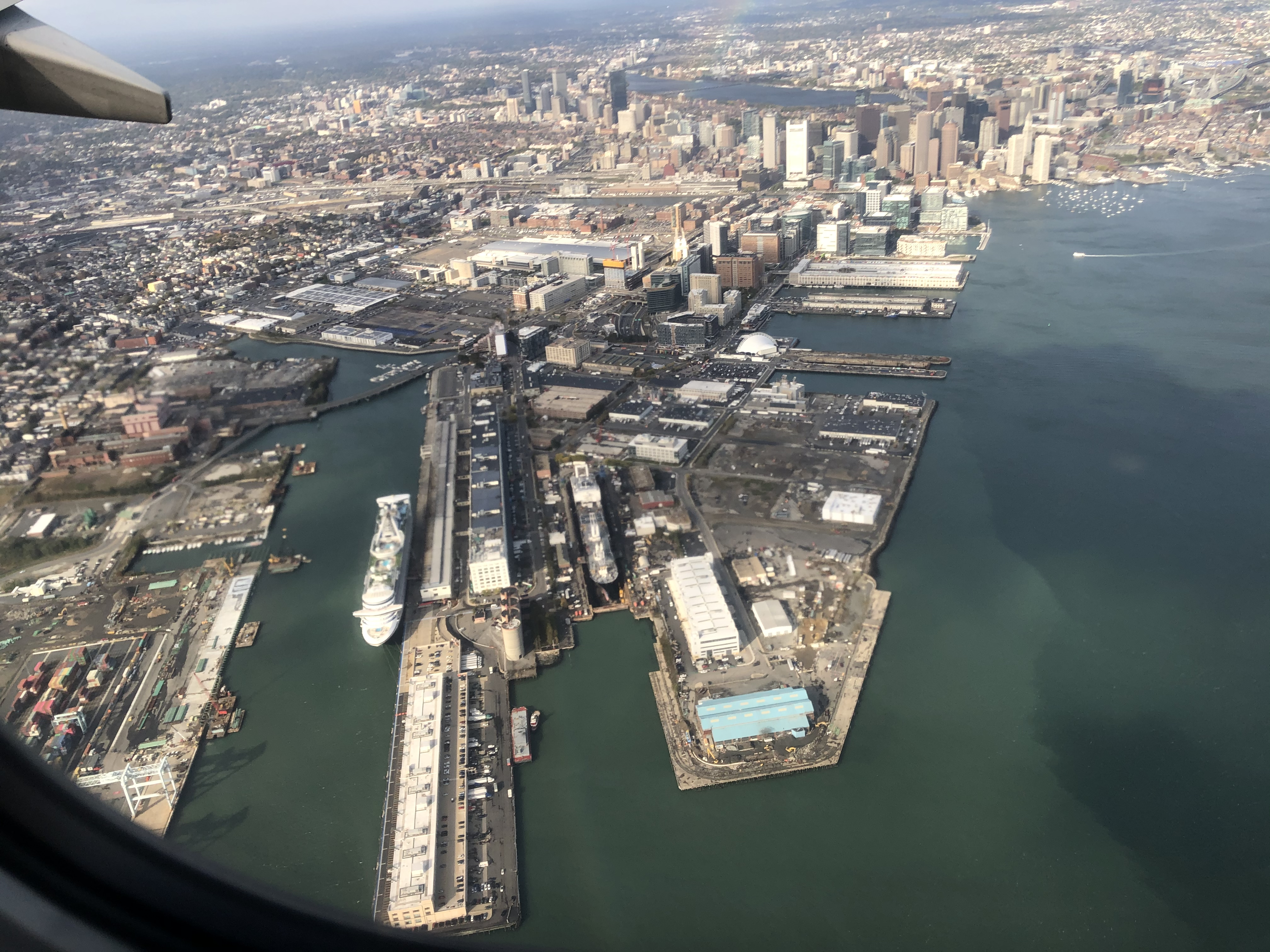
Container and cruise terminals and dry dock #3 in 2019

== See also ==
- Boston Harbor Islands National Recreation Area
- Boston Harborwalk
- List of islands of Massachusetts
- Long Wharf
- Massachusetts Port Authority
