= Rainsford Island =

Island in Boston Harbor, US

Coordinates: 42°18′43.10″N 70°57′15.30″W

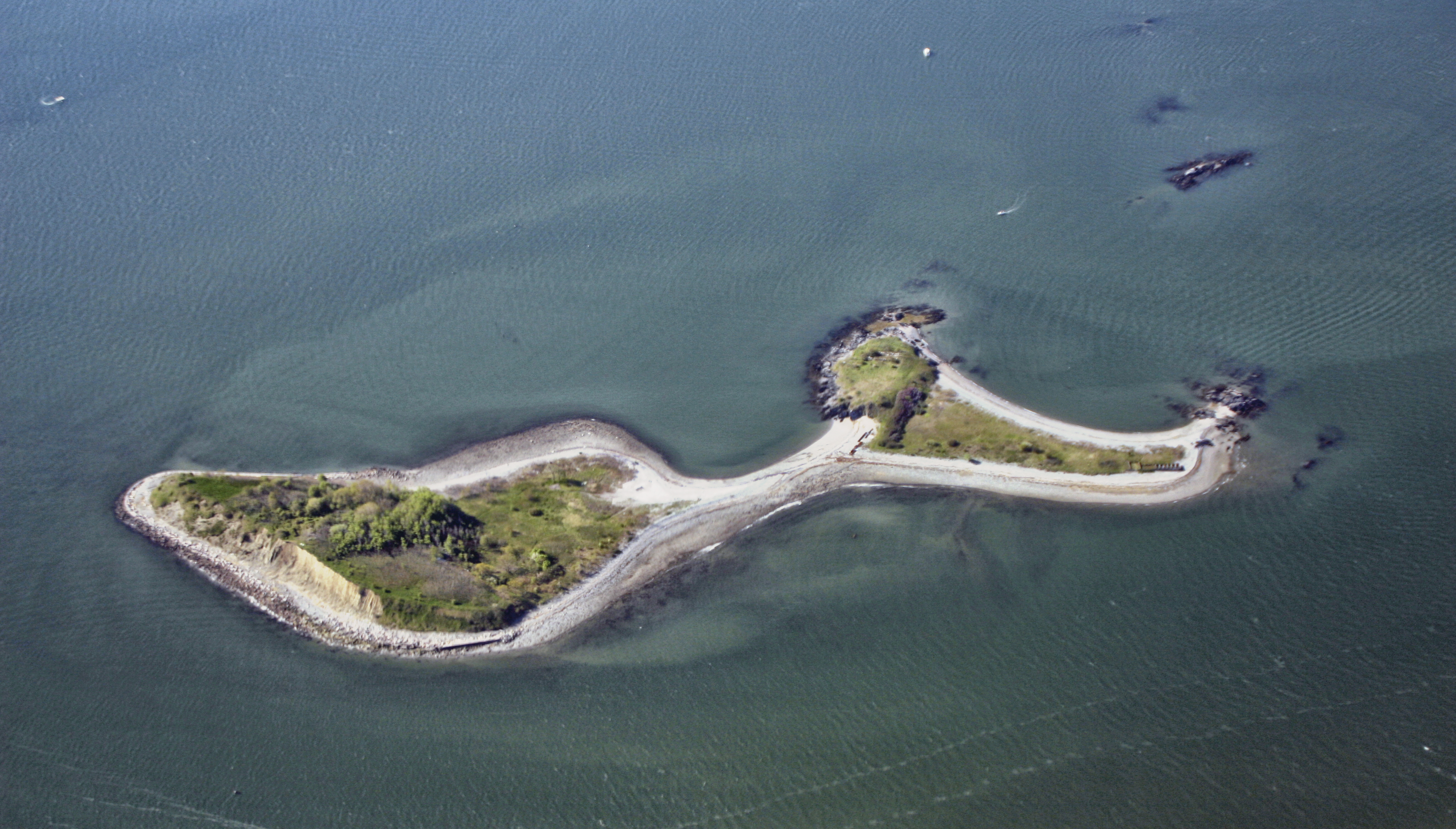
Rainsford Island

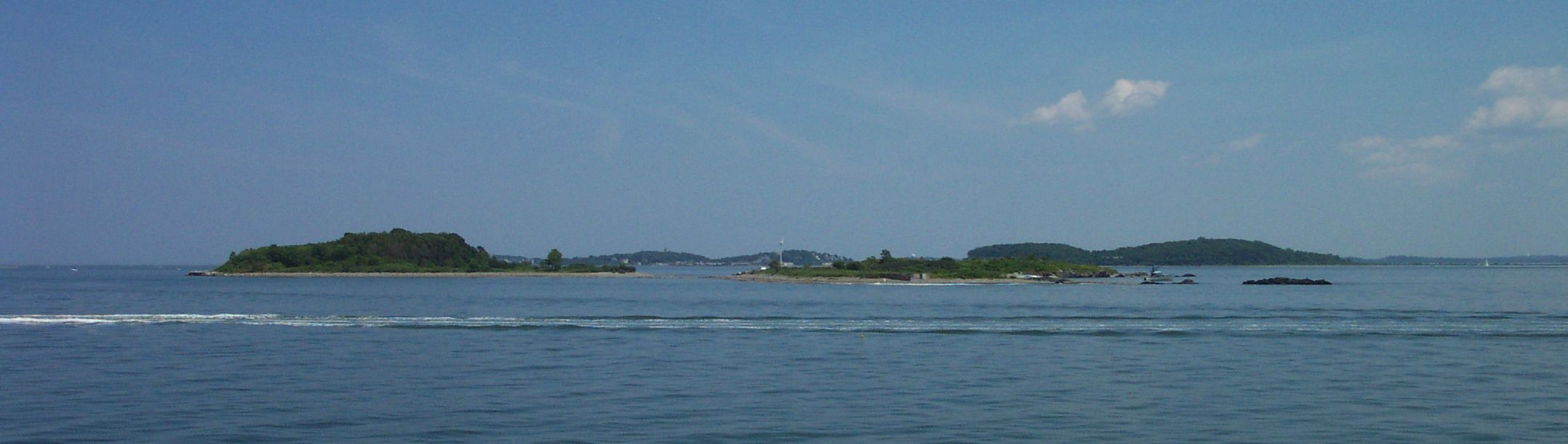
View from the water

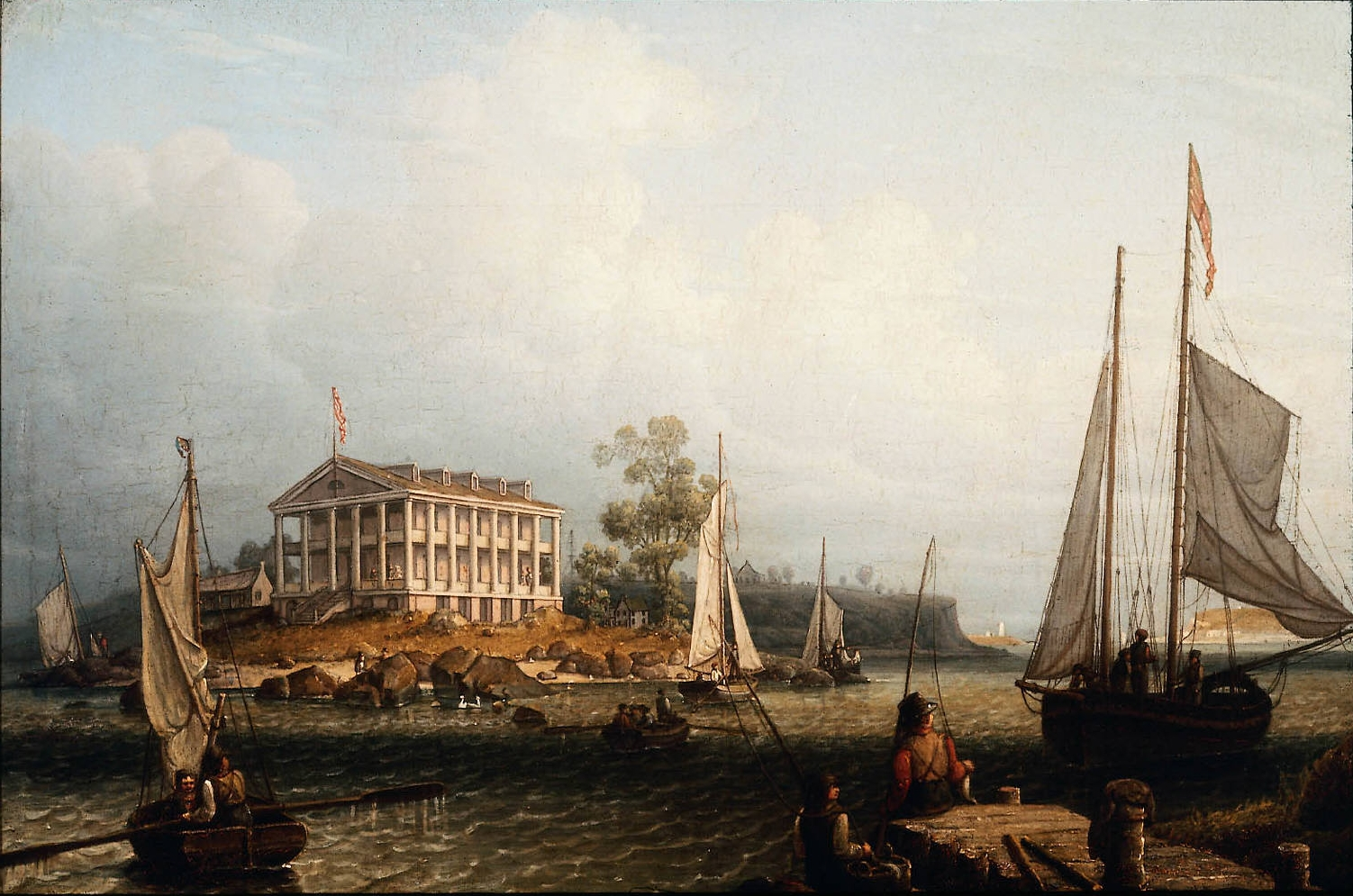
Quarantine Hospital on Rainsford Island, built in 1832 by Josiah Rogers

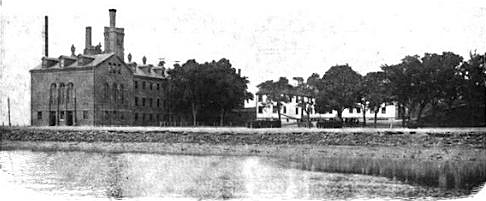
Rainsford Island reformatory, 1897

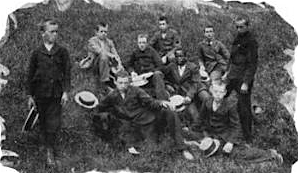
Boys at the Rainsford Island reformatory, 1897

Rainsford Island, formerly known Hospital Island, Pest House Island, and Quarantine Island, is a 11-acre (45,000 m^{2}) island in the Boston Harbor, situated between Long Island and Peddocks Island. The island is composed of two drumlins, reaching an elevation of 49 feet (15 m) above sea level. The shoreline is predominantly rocky with a sandy cove in the south side, and a variety of wildflowers abound. Access is by private boat only. Since 1996 it has been part of the Boston Harbor Islands National Recreation Area.

== History ==
This island was named for its earliest known European settler, Edward Rainsford (brother of Richard Raynsford), who may have been granted rights to the island in 1636 to make a farm to keep the cattle of Owen Rowe.

The island is known to have been used by Native Americans and, during the colonial period, was occupied, farmed and grazed. Between 1737 and 1925 the island served at different times as a quarantine hospital, unmarked burial ground for the diseased and criminals, almshouse, veterans hospital, reform school, and resort. However only foundations and a dilapidated seawall still survive from these uses.

Rainsford Island hospital facilities were expanded and improved in the early 19th century. A huge Greek Revival-style building, the Stone Hospital or Greek Temple, was built in 1832 by Josiah Rogers. The Stone Hospital may have been designed by his brother, the American architect Isaiah Rogers, who was celebrated for his designs of the Boston and New York Merchants' Exchange, the U.S. Treasury Building in Washington, D.C., and the Tremont Hotel in Boston.

On August 19, 1899, A group of boys escaped after setting fire to part of the reformatory, and many left the island on stolen boats and improvised rafts. Most were eventually captured.

== Cemetery ==
At least 1,777 people were buried on Rainsford Island between the 1730s and 1898, but as of 2020 there is no surviving monument, fence or other marker denoting the cemetery. Most people interred were poor or had died after treatment in the island's hospitals and many were buried in mass graves. Over 100 Civil War veterans are buried there including at least one from the 54th Massachusetts Regiment.

== Bibliography ==
- "Rainsford Island: Resort to Reformatory", lecture by Ellen Berkland, Boston City Archeologist, Boston Landmarks Commission, and Elizabeth Carella, curator, Archives for Historical Documentation, Wednesday, May 14, 2003, held at the Old South Meeting House, Boston, Massachusetts.

"From a farm, summer resort, quarantine hospital, almshouse and a boy's reformatory to eventually an abandoned eleven acres, Rainsford Island in Boston Harbor has served many since its 1636 occupation by Edward Rainsford. Ellen P. Berkland, Boston City Archeologist, and Elizabeth Carella, Curator of Photography, present how one archeological field season and extensive documentary research shed light on the fascinating history of Rainsford Island. This slide lecture reviews the archeological and historic evidence and examines the ways in which the island has served the marginalized populations of Boston for decades."

- Claesson, Stefan, "Rainsford Island Archaeological Survey", Institute of Maritime History, 2001-2002.
