= The Graves Light =

Historic lighthouse in Massachusetts, United States

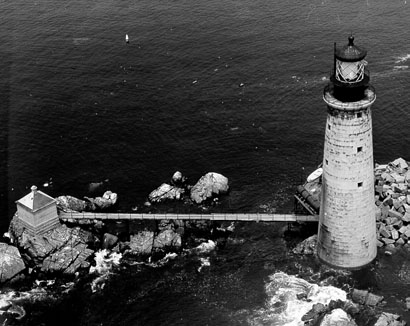
- US Coast Guard photo
- Location: Offshore of Boston, Massachusetts
- Coordinates: 42°21′53.6″N 70°52′8.7″W

Tower
- Constructed: 1903
- Foundation: Granite
- Construction: Granite Block
- Automated: 1976, solar 2001
- Height: 113 feet (34 m) (tower)
- Shape: Conical
- Markings: Natural with Black Lantern
- Heritage: National Register of Historic Places listed place
- Fog signal: HORN: 2 every 20s

Light
- First lit: 1905
- Focal height: 96 feet (29 m)
- Lens: First order Fresnel Lens (original), VRB-25 (current)
- Range: 15 nautical miles (28 km; 17 mi)
- Characteristic: Fl (2) W 12s
- Graves Light Station
- U.S. National Register of Historic Places
- Nearest city: Boston, Massachusetts
- Architect: Royal Luther
- Website: www.graveslightstation.com
- MPS: Lighthouses of Massachusetts TR
- NRHP reference No.: 87002041
- Added to NRHP: September 28, 1987

The Graves Light is a lighthouse located on The Graves, the outermost island of the Boston Harbor Islands National Recreation Area, and 9 miles (14 km) offshore of downtown Boston, Massachusetts, USA.

At 113 feet (34 m), it is the tallest lighthouse in the approaches to the Port of Boston, and is an important navigation aid for traffic to and from the port. It was built at the same time that the North Channel into Boston Harbor was dredged to become the principal entrance for large vessels. The Graves are the outermost rocks near the outer end of the North Channel.

It was added to the National Register of Historic Places as Graves Light Station on September 28, 1987, reference number 87002041.

== Construction and history ==
The lighthouse was built in 1905, to a conical design using granite blocks on a granite foundation, and equipped with one of the few first-order Fresnel lens used. The lens assembly stands about 12 ft (4m) tall and is now at the Smithsonian Institution. The light was the setting for the climactic storm in the 1948 film Portrait of Jennie.

Operated by the United States Coast Guard, the light was automated in 1976 and has a characteristic of two white flashes every 12 seconds.

Various sources agree that the ledges were named for a Thomas Graves, but differ on who he was; some prefer a 17th-century English rear admiral; others like a colonial-era American merchant. The USCG history web site shows both. The new owners retained a historian who ascertained that the ledges were named for Rear Admiral Thomas Graves (1605–1653), whose family settled in Charlestown, Massachusetts, but who died in an English naval battle against the Dutch in 1653.

The Graves Island Light Station was put up for auction on June 10, 2013, by the U.S. General Services Administration. Opening bid was $26,000. The tenth and winning bid was a record $933,888, the highest price ever paid for a U.S. lighthouse. A Massachusetts couple, David and Lynn Waller, were the buyers of the lighthouse. The lighthouse includes two bedrooms, a kitchen, and a study, but landing is difficult and entering the building requires traversing a 40-foot (12 m) ladder. A former caretaker described it like "living in a pipe."

As of 2014, the Wallers were undertaking a major restoration project costing hundreds of thousands of dollars. The lighthouse is still being used for navigation using solar panels since 2001, and will remain so under the terms of the sale. These replaced a severed underwater cable that supplied electricity from the town of Hull. The cable had replaced the original oil-fired lamp, fueled with oil stored in an adjacent building; the walkway to the oil house washed away in 1991.

== See also ==
- National Register of Historic Places listings in southern Boston, Massachusetts
