= Boston Harbor Islands National and State Park =

Group of islands in Boston, Massachusetts

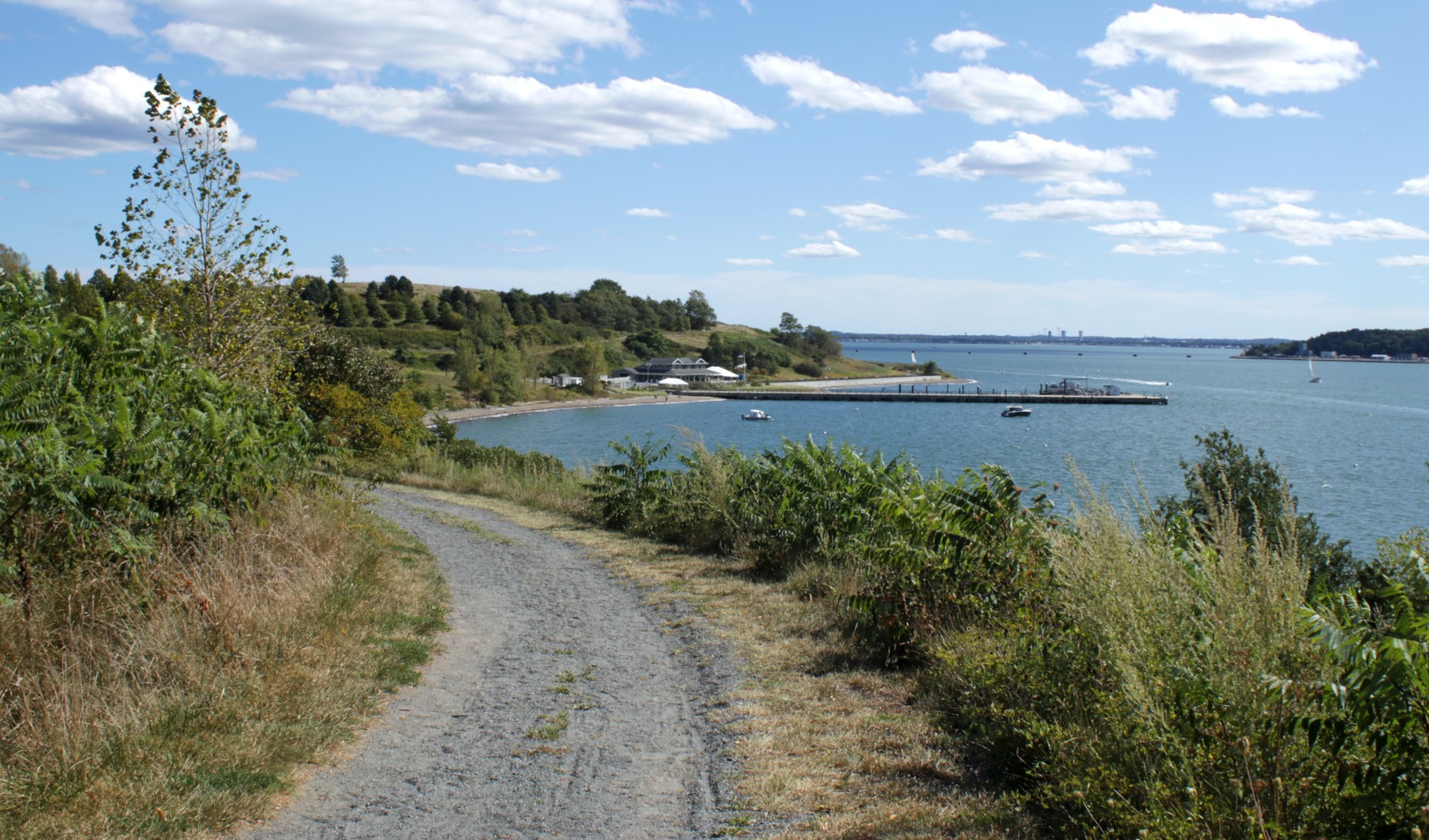
- View of Spectacle Island showing trails, visitor center, and pier from the island's north side.

- Location within Massachusetts Location within the United States
- Interactive map of Boston Harbor Islands National and State Park
- Location: Norfolk, Plymouth, and Suffolk counties, Massachusetts, US
- Nearest city: Boston, Massachusetts
- Coordinates: 42°19′7″N 70°56′45″W
- Area: 1,482 acres (6.00 km^{2})
- Established: November 12, 1996
- Visitors: 28,157 (in 2024)
- Governing body: Boston Harbor Islands Partnership which includes the National Park Service together with other federal, state, city, and nonprofit agencies.
- Website: Boston Harbor Islands National Recreation Area
- Boston Harbor Islands Archeological District
- U.S. National Register of Historic Places
- U.S. Historic district
- Area: 886.7 acres (358.8 ha) (historic district)
- NRHP reference No.: 85003323
- Added to NRHP: December 21, 1985

Boston Harbor Islands National and State Park is a combination national recreation area and state park situated among the islands of Boston Harbor, Massachusetts, United States. The park is made up of 34 islands and peninsulas and is managed by the Boston Harbor Islands Partnership. Twenty-one of the islands are also included in the Boston Harbor Islands Archeological District.

The park is significant for a wide range of natural and cultural resources, including three National Historic Landmarks, unique geological features, archaeological resources resulting from thousands of years of occupation of the islands by Indigenous people of Massachusetts, and complex natural communities.

Attractions include hiking trails, beaches, the Civil War-era Fort Warren, and Boston Light, the oldest lighthouse station in the United States. Georges Island and Spectacle Island are served seasonally by ferries to and from Boston, and Peddocks Island is served by a ferry from Hingham.

== List of islands and peninsulas ==
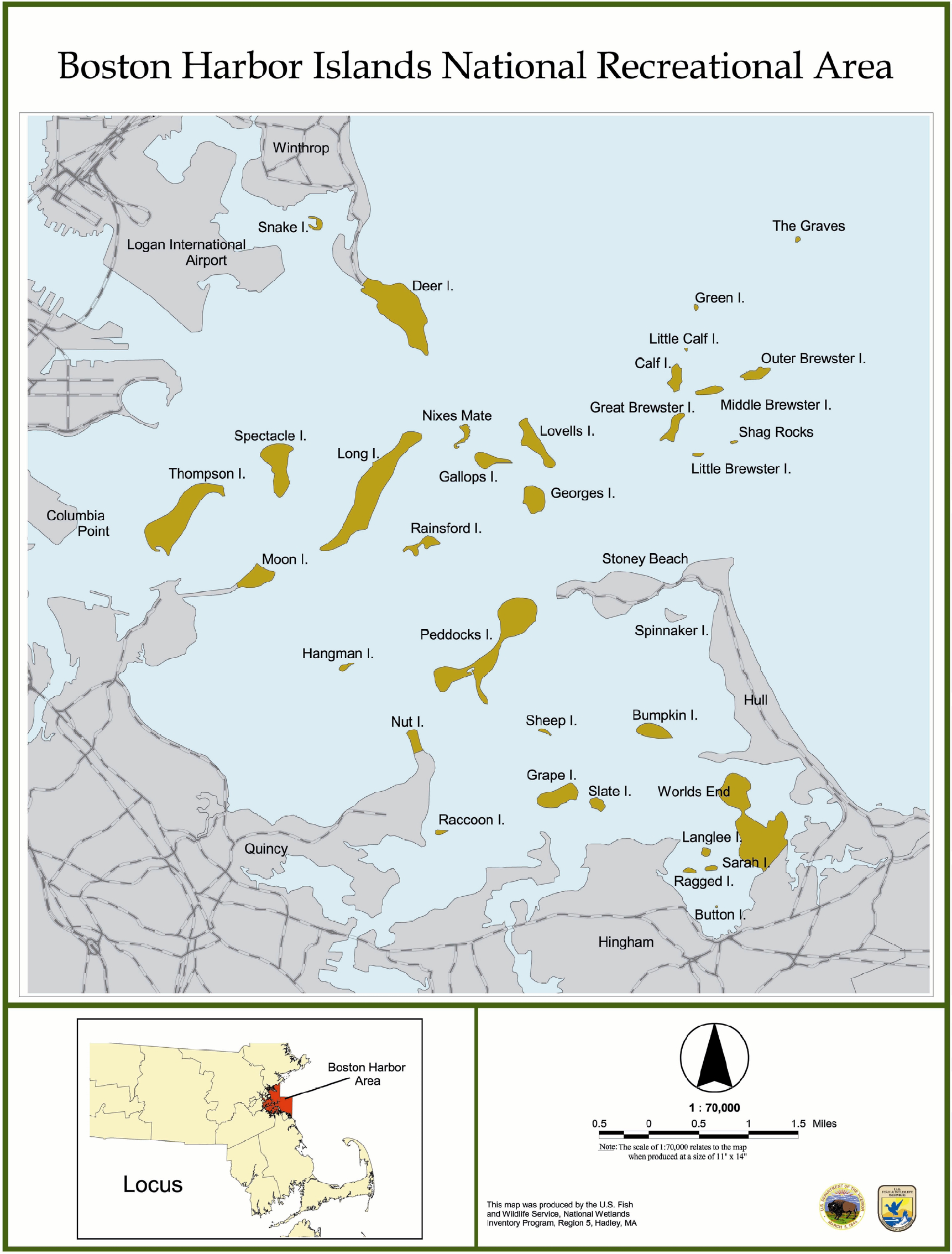
Map of the Boston Harbor Islands National Recreation Area

The Boston Harbor Islands National Recreation Area is made up of islands and peninsulas on and around Boston Harbor. These include:

- Bumpkin Island (Hingham)
- Button Island (Hingham)
- Calf Island (Boston)
- Deer Island (Boston)
- Gallops Island (Boston)
- Georges Island (Boston)
- Grape Island (Weymouth)
- The Graves (Boston)
- Great Brewster Island (Boston)
- Green Island (Boston)
- Hangman Island (Quincy)
- Langlee Island (Hingham)
- Little Brewster Island (Boston)
- Little Calf Island (Boston)
- Long Island (Boston)
- Lovells Island (Boston)
- Middle Brewster Island (Boston)
- Moon Island (Quincy)
- Nixes Mate (Boston)
- Nut Island (Quincy)
- Outer Brewster Island (Boston)
- Peddocks Island (Hull)
- Raccoon Island (Quincy)
- Ragged Island (Hingham)
- Rainsford Island (Boston)
- Sarah Island (Hingham)
- Shag Rocks (Boston)
- Sheep Island (Weymouth)
- Slate Island (Weymouth)
- Snake Island (Winthrop)
- Spectacle Island (Boston)
- Thompson Island (Boston)
- Webb Memorial Park (Weymouth)
- World's End (Hingham)

Though they are located in Boston Harbor, neither Castle Island nor Spinnaker Island belong to Boston Harbor Islands National Recreation Area. Other former islands (Apple Island, Governors Island and Noddle's Island) were obliterated by the formation of East Boston and the expansion of Logan International Airport before the creation of the national recreation area.

== History ==
=== Indigenous history ===
The islands have been places of significance to Native Americans for many thousands of years. Extensive archaeological evidence of Indigenous activity in the area motivated the designation of 21 islands in an archaeological district listed on the National Register of Historic Places. Indigenous tribes connected with the Boston Harbor Islands include the Massachusett Tribe at Ponkapoag, the Mashpee Wampanoag Tribe, the Wampanoag Tribe of Gay Head (Aquinnah), the Nipmuc Nation, and the Narragansett Indian Tribe.

People began using various sites among the islands on a seasonal basis starting in the Middle Archaic period and intensified this occupation throughout the Late Archaic and Woodland periods. The islands' rich variety of resources, including shellfish, migratory birds, nut-bearing trees, fish, seals, and mammals like deer and raccoon, made them ideal places for temporary settlements. Prehistoric people also practiced controlled burning, woodcutting, and plant collecting, using traditional subsistence methods that made minimal impacts on natural resources. Beyond subsistence, the islands have also served as sites for ceremony and burial grounds.

During King Philip's War, English colonists distrusted indigenous people, even those that had converted to Christianity and moved to "praying towns." Colonists forcefully removed hundreds of Native American people, mostly women and children, from their homes in these towns (along with non-Christian Native Americans) and placed them in internment camps on Deer Island, Long Island, Peddocks Island, and Great Brewster Island. With inadequate shelter and food, about half of them died due to starvation or exposure while others were sold into enslavement in the West Indies. Women and children made up the majority of people interned on Deer Island. Today, descendants of the Tribal Nations involved in King Philip's War meet yearly on Deer Island to commemorate their ancestors' suffering.

=== Post-colonization ===
With the arrival of European colonists came heavy use of the islands. They became hubs for resource extraction, coastal defense, industry, and maritime navigation, amid other activities.

The islands’ proximity to Boston, a major port city, has made them strategic locations for coastal defense facilities, and many of the islands saw activity during the Revolutionary War, Civil War, and the two world wars. Many of the harbor's structures that are associated with military history still stand today, including Fort Warren.

Since the 17th century the islands have been locations for many institutions, including quarantine hospitals, almshouses, reform schools, military prisons, and internment facilities. Businesses and recreation facilities, from resorts to waste processing plants, were also operated on several islands.

Several navigation aids of historic significance, including Boston Light, are also located in the park. The park boundaries also include sites of former lighthouses and range lights that are no longer standing, some of which have been replaced by modern structures.

=== Modern history ===
The islands were privately owned until the 1970s when the state of Massachusetts purchased the islands to preserve their nature while developing them for recreation. Boston Harbor Islands National Recreation Area was established on November 12, 1996; the federal government does not own the park, but the National Park Service participates in the Boston Harbor Islands Partnership to coordinate management.

=== National Register of Historic Places ===
The park is home to six sites that have been listed on the National Register of Historic Places, including three National Historic Landmarks. These also include mainland access points, such as Long Wharf, that were named in the park's establishing legislation.

=== National Historic Landmarks ===
- Boston Light
- Fort Warren
- Long Wharf and Custom House Block

== Ecology ==
The park contains an extensive array of habitats. Among the park's 35+ miles of coasts and shoreline are intertidal and subtidal zones, rocky beaches, and coastal bluffs. Forests, grassy meadows, salt marshes, and other habitats can be found on some islands.

These marine and terrestrial habitats are homes to many different species of animal. Land animals include coyote, common raccoon, and white-tailed deer. More than 200 species of bird have been documented on the islands. Humpback, fin, minke, and North Atlantic right whales are occasional visitors to the harbor along with other marine mammals like porpoises and dolphins. The islands are rich with mollusks, including many species of mussel, snail, clam, oyster, and more. Marine arthropods like crab and lobster can be found here as well as many terrestrial arthropods, such as insects and arachnids.

Plant life on the islands is also extensive, with native, non-native, and invasive species present depending on the history of the island in question. Native trees include eastern cottonwood, quaking aspen, northern red oak, bitternut hickory, and sassafras, among many others. Herbaceous plants and shrubs inhabit many of the islands’ meadows, forests, and coasts.

Various species of protist and fungus have also been documented on the islands.

Because of the park's abundance of healthy habitat for shorebirds, the park was designated a Massachusetts Important Bird Area. The park surveys bird species as indicators for the ecological health of the park.

Six species in the park are listed through the Massachusetts Natural Heritage Program. These include the following bird species: barn owl, common tern, least tern, Northern harrier; and the plant species sea beach dock and American sea blite.

== Management ==
The Boston Harbor Islands National Recreation Area is managed by the Boston Harbor Islands Partnership, a statutory body established as a federal operating committee by the park enabling legislation. The partnership consists of individual members who represent a range of federal, state, city, and nonprofit agencies, including:

- National Park Service
- U.S. Coast Guard
- Massachusetts Department of Conservation and Recreation
- Massachusetts Port Authority
- Massachusetts Water Resources Authority
- City of Boston
- City of Boston Planning Department
- Boston Harbor Now
- Cathleen Stone Island Outward Bound Education Center
- The Trustees of Reservations
- Boston Harbor Islands Advisory Council

Apart from the representative for the Coast Guard, who is appointed by the Secretary of Homeland Security, all the members of the partnership are appointed by the Secretary of the Interior after consultation with the appropriate agency or other body.

In practice, day-to-day management of each individual island or other site is the responsibility of one of the partner agencies or other bodies. The partnership provides a consistency and coordination across the whole park.

== Access ==
Boston Harbor City Cruises offers ferry service from Long Wharf to Georges and Spectacle Islands. Ferry service from Hingham to Peddocks Island is also available.

Deer Island, Nut Island, Worlds End, and Webb Memorial are accessible by road from the mainland. Moon Island and Long Island are closed to the public.

== In popular culture ==
Bostonian Dennis Lehane drew inspiration from the harbor islands when writing his novel Shutter Island, citing a childhood visit to Long Island. The harbor islands are also featured in the film adaptation, as portions of the movie were shot at Peddocks Island.

== See also ==
- National Register of Historic Places listings in Plymouth County, Massachusetts
- National Register of Historic Places listings in Quincy, Massachusetts
- National Register of Historic Places listings in Suffolk County, Massachusetts
