= Snake Island (Massachusetts) =

Island in Boston Harbor, USA

Coordinates: 42°21′56.74″N 70°58′43.22″W

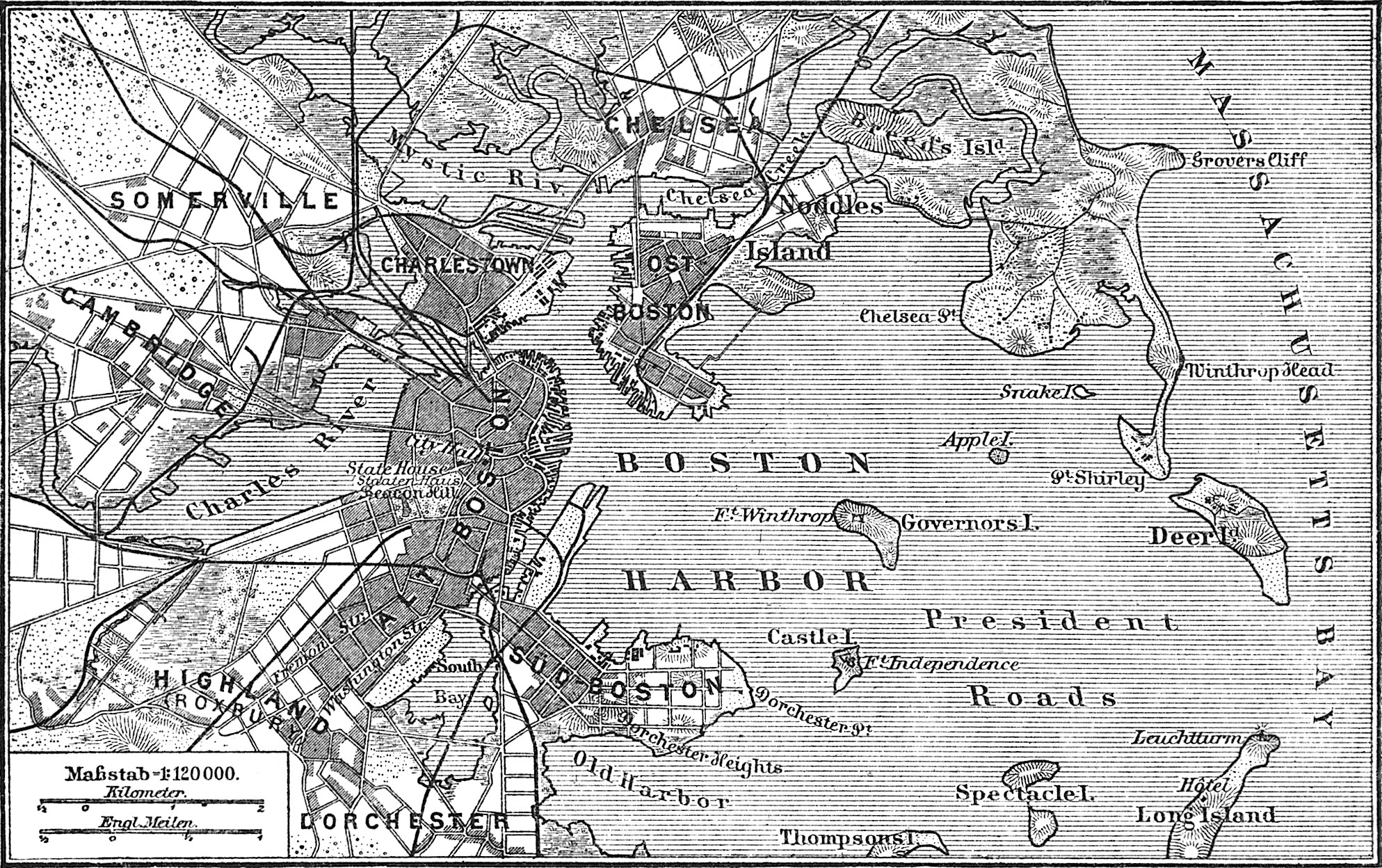
1890 map of Boston Harbor showing Snake Island on the middle righthand side.

Snake Island, also known as Bare Island, is an island in Boston Harbor. The island is part of the Boston Harbor Islands National Recreation Area and is situated in the inner harbor between the town of Winthrop and the reclaimed land that forms Logan International Airport. It is part of the Town of Winthrop. It is named for its serpentine shape, and has a permanent size of 3 acres (12,000 m^{2}), and rises to a height of 10 feet (3.0 m) above sea level.

Since the 18th century the island has been owned by variety of owners, and has been used for livestock grazing, and as a squatter camp occupied by lobstermen and clammers. In the 1900s a grounded steamer served as residence for lobstermen from Winthrop. Today the island is uninhabited and classified as "conservation land". Access is by private boat only.

The island is less than 1/4 mile from two shores of the Town of Winthrop. Unique among the Boston Harbor Islands, it has an interior lagoon which fills and partly drains, with the tide. The water entrance to the lagoon is winding and only six feet wide, not navigable for even a canoe or kayak, except at an unusually high tide. The lagoon and lack of predators makes the island attractive to birds, including migratory species. It is posted off-limits in the spring, when many bird species nest there. In recent years the island has increased in area, due to shoaling of the surrounding water, especially to the west; its long "tail" is now fully exposed at low tide. Access is only possible by beachable small craft, due to very shallow water and mud flats around the island.
