= The Graves (Massachusetts) =

Group of rocks in Suffolk County, Massachusetts, United States

Coordinates: 42°21′54.67″N 70°52′09.65″W

The Graves is an aggregation of rock outcroppings in Massachusetts Bay, Massachusetts, United States. Situated some 11 miles (18 km) offshore of downtown Boston, it is the outermost island in the Boston Harbor Islands National Recreation Area.

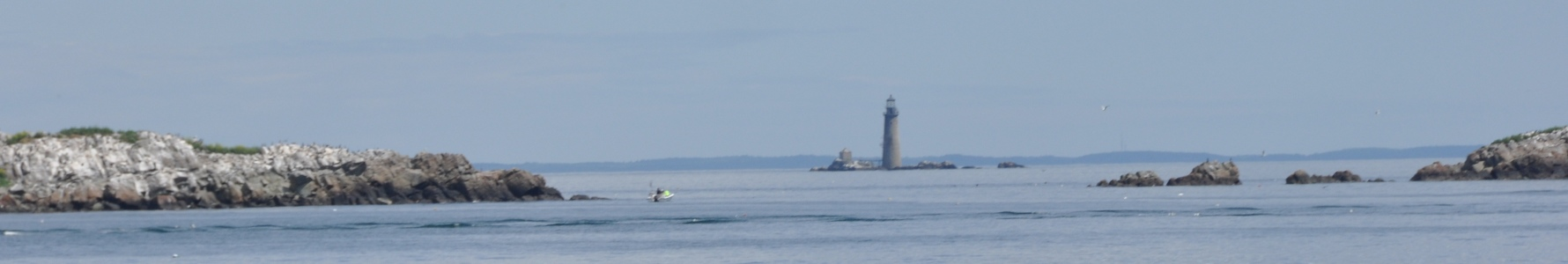
View of The Graves, bracketed by two of the Brewster Islands

It is the location of The Graves Light, at 113 feet (34 m) tall the tallest lighthouse in Boston Harbor, and an important navigation aid for traffic to and from the port. The island has a permanent size of 1.8 acres, and rises to a height of 15 feet (4.6 m) above sea level; there is only aquatic vegetation on the island. The island is privately owned and the beacon and foghorn are managed by the Coast Guard, and is not open to the public.

The Graves are named after Thomas Graves, a prominent early trader of colonial Massachusetts and a rear admiral in the English Navy who was killed in action against the Dutch in 1653.

The Graves are northeast of the Roaring Bulls and far northwest of Three and One-half Fathom Ledge. The Commonwealth of Massachusetts ceded jurisdiction of The Graves, which lay outside the jurisdiction of any town, to the Federal Government on April 22, 1903, so that a lighthouse could be built on the ledge. The United States Lighthouse Service operated Graves Light until 1939, when it was merged into the United States Coast Guard. Graves Light was declared surplus property and sold by auction to a private owner in 2013.
