= Grape Island (Norfolk County, Massachusetts) =

Island in Boston Harbor

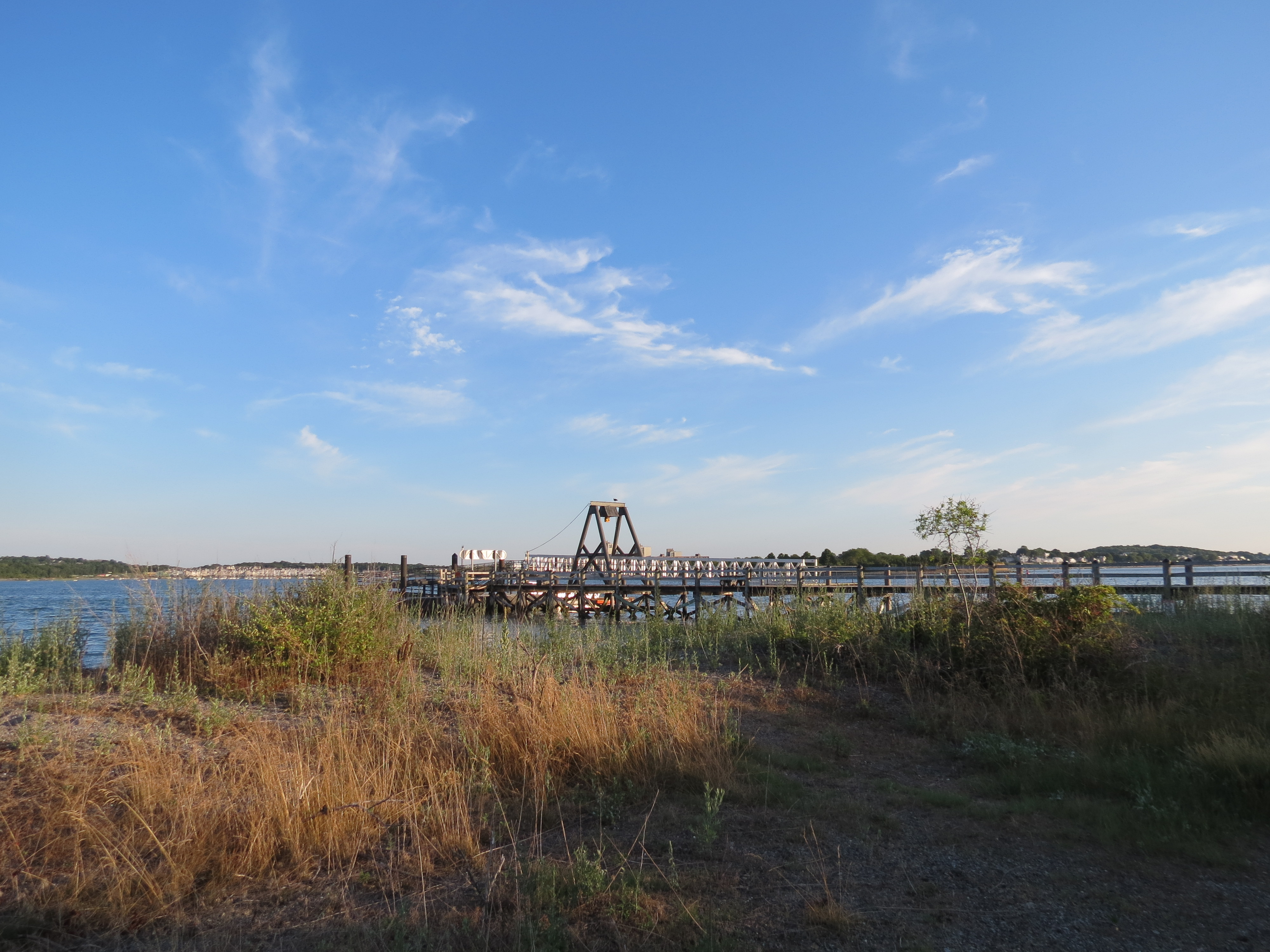
- Grape Island in 2012
- Interactive map of Grape Island

Geography
- Location: Boston Harbor
- Coordinates: 42°16′08.44″N 70°55′15.05″W

Administration
- United States

Grape Island is an island in the Hingham Bay area of the Boston Harbor Islands National Recreation Area. The island is part of the territory of the town of Weymouth, Massachusetts. The island has a permanent size of 54 acres (220,000 m^{2}), plus an intertidal zone of a further 46 acres (190,000 m^{2}), and is composed of two drumlins, reaching an elevation of 70 feet (21 m) above sea level, and connected by a marshy lowland. Tidal sand spits extend from the west end towards Weymouth Neck in Webb Memorial State Park and from the east end towards Slate Island.

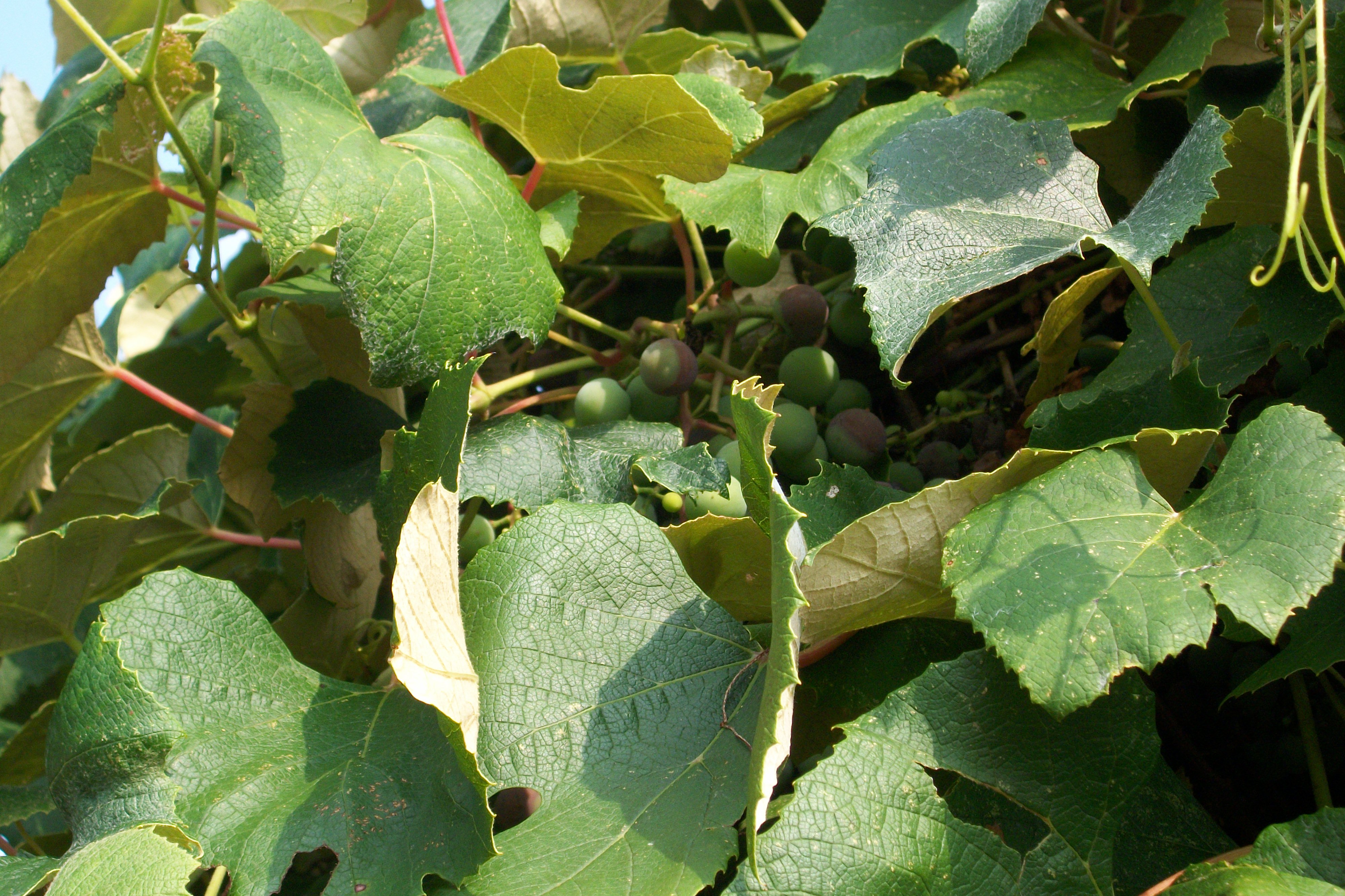
Concord grapes growing on Grape Island

As a visitor attraction, Grape Island offers trails, rocky beaches, and camping in wooded campsites. At weekends and summer weekdays it is served by a shuttle boat to and from Georges Island, connecting there with ferries to Boston and Quincy.

The island was farmed and grazed for three hundred years, until the 1940s. On the eve of the American Revolution, the island was owned by Hingham resident Elisha Leavitt, a Tory. In 1775, British troops raided the island during the siege of Boston, as Abigail Adams wrote to her husband John about May 24, 1775: "...it seems their Expidition (sic) was to Grape Island for Levets hay." A pitched battle ensued until the British were forced to retreat to the mainland. The angry colonists burned Leavitt's barn to the ground. In the end, very little damage was done to either side despite the effort expended. Three British soldiers may have been wounded (unconfirmed), no Continental soldiers or partisans were wounded, and less than two tons of hay were taken by the British.

Since the abandonment of agricultural use in the 1940s, the natural succession of vegetation has created a wooded and shrubby landscape. Vegetation on the island includes early successional tree and shrub species on the drumlins, including staghorn sumac, gray birch, and quaking aspen. The island has an abundance of berries, including blackberry, dewberry, raspberry, blueberry, huckleberry, and American elderberry. The island's marshy lowland contains salt tolerant species such as saltspray rose, cordgrass, purple loosestrife, honeysuckle, and seaside goldenrod.

Grape Island contains two freshwater springs. One spring is located on the north side of the western drumlin and is located underneath a large boulder that faces Peddock's Island. Another freshwater spring is located behind the marsh that is situated in the saddle between the two drumlins. Both of these areas are off the trail.
