= Shag Rocks (Massachusetts) =

Group of rocks in Massachusetts, United States

Coordinates: 42°19′49″N 70°52′56″W

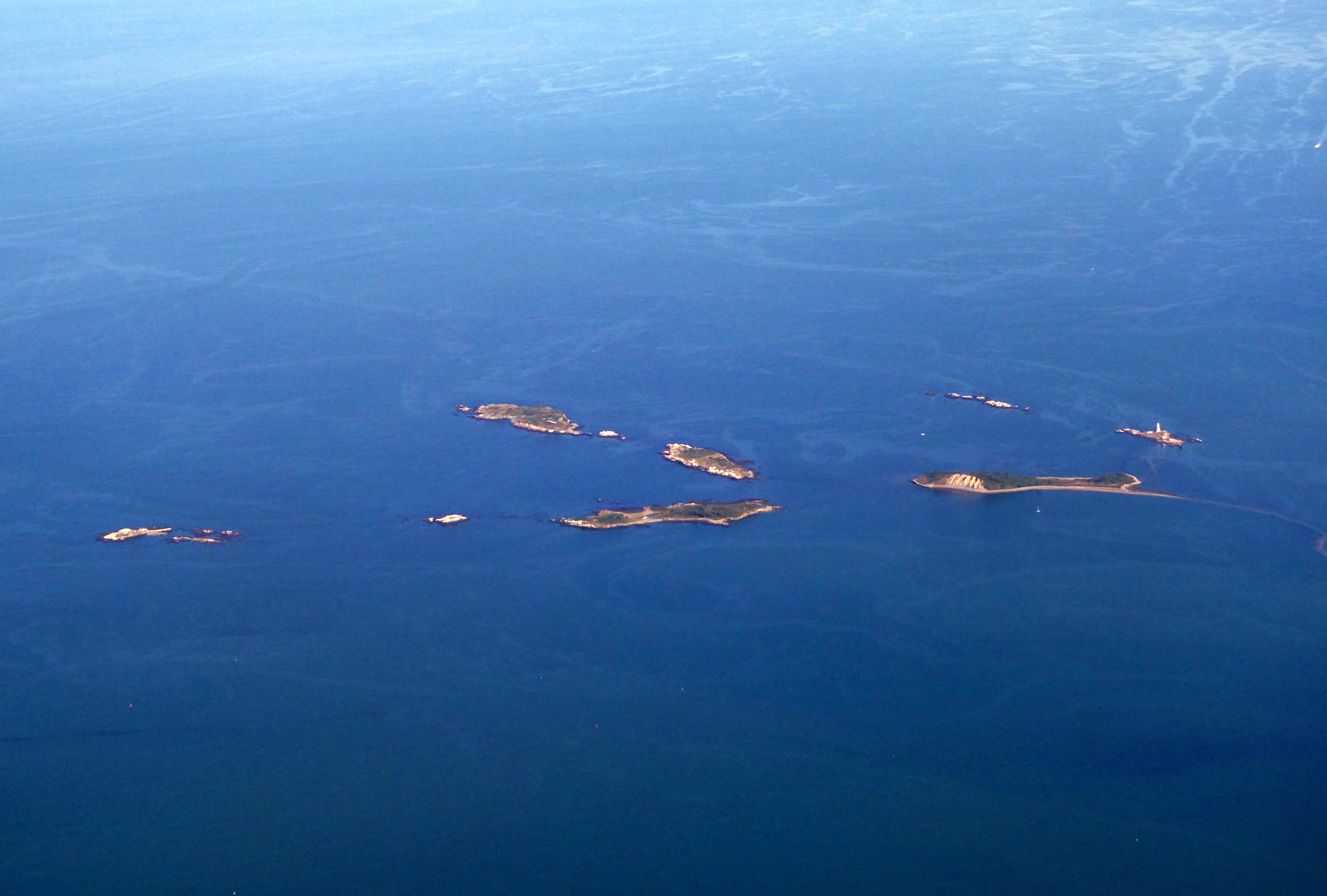
Shag Rocks (second from right, rear) and surroundings in 2024

Shag Rocks are barren rocks situated 8 nautical miles (15 km; 9.2 mi) offshore of Custom House Tower in downtown Boston, in the Boston Harbor Islands National Recreation Area and within the city limits of Boston. The rocks are northeast of Little Brewster Island and east of Great Brewster Island and have been the site of several shipwrecks. Boston Light on Little Brewster Island warns mariners to steer clear of the rocks. Public access is impractical.
