= Little Calf Island =

Island in Suffolk County, Massachusetts, United States

Coordinates: 42°20′44.99″N 70°53′38.35″W

Little Calf Island is a small rocky island in the Boston Harbor Islands National Recreation Area, some 9 miles (14 km) offshore from downtown Boston, Massachusetts. The island has no vegetation and no history of human occupation. It is used for nesting by gulls and cormorants which can be aggressive during their nesting season. Access by humans is by private boat only, and is discouraged.
