= Slate Island =

Island in Hingham Bay, Massachusetts, USA

Coordinates: 42°16′0.63″N 70°54′43.9″W

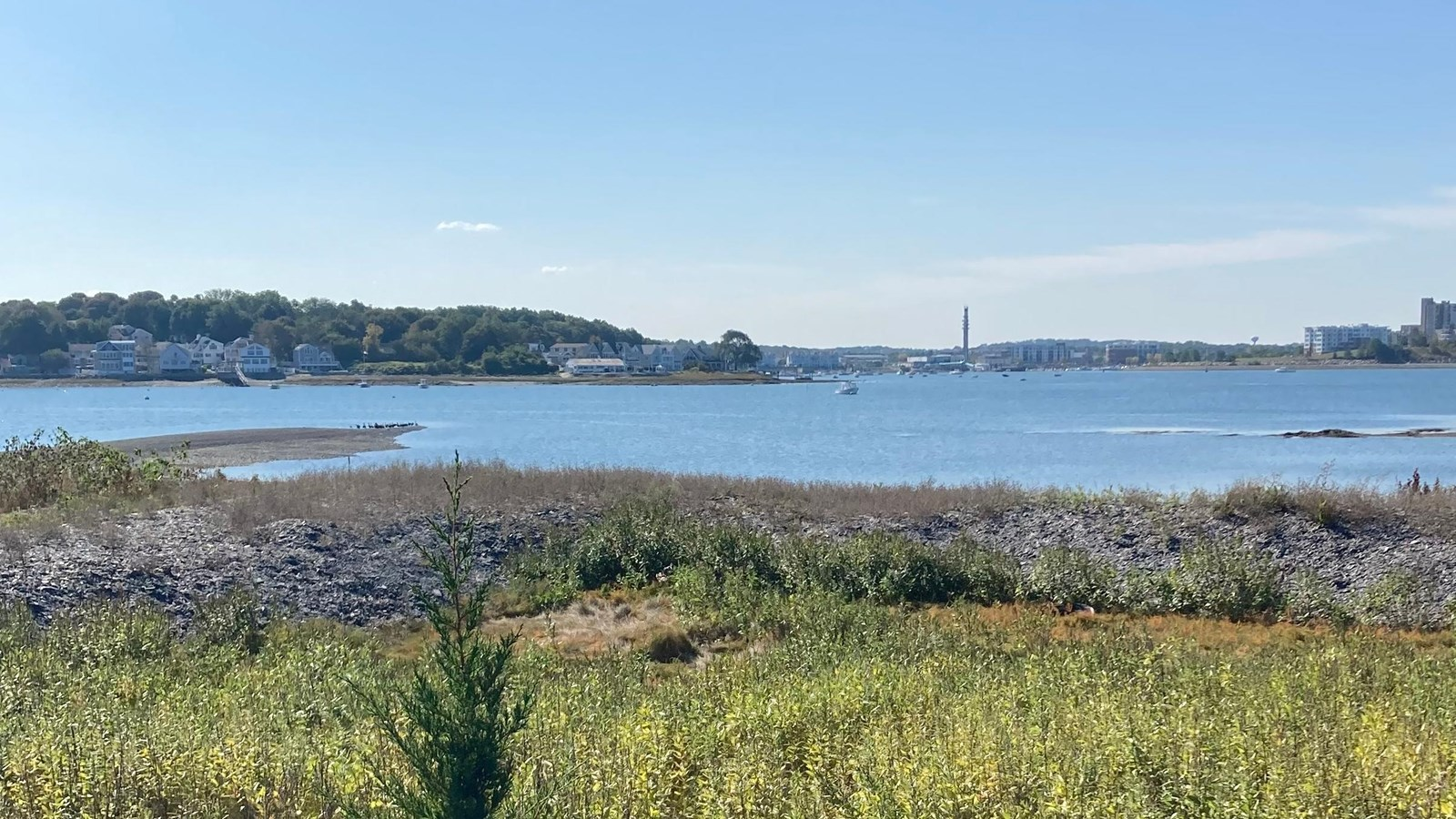
View from Slate Island

Slate Island is an uninhabited island of about 12.7 acres (5.1 ha) (at high tide) in Hingham Bay, an arm of Boston Harbor. It is part of Boston Harbor Islands National and State Park and is just east of Grape Island. The island mostly consists of slate outcrops partly covered with glacial till, and the shore is mostly rock. The highest elevation is 32 feet (9.8 m).

The island was visited seasonally by Native Americans. In colonial times slate was quarried from the islands (the remnants of the quarry are still visible), mostly for house foundations. William Torey was given a grant for the island in 1650, with a stipulation that anyone was free to extract slate. Slate mining continued to a small degree into the 20th century and contributed to soil erosion on the rocky island. Later owners included Joseph Andrews, Samuel Lovell, Thomas Jones, and Caleb Loring.

In the 17th century the island became part of the town of Hull (it is now in Weymouth). Around 1840 a hermit (his name lost to history) lived in a hut near the southern cove. (Moses Forster Sweetser opined that "his lonely hut must have made Thoreau's hermitage at Walden seem like Scollay Square after a theatre performance.") In the 1890s owner Edwin Clapp gave the island to the Clapp Memorial Association, which briefly hosted a summer camp there. Slate Island was privately owned until the 1970s when it became public property and part of the Boston Harbor Islands National and State Park.

There are no trails, docks, or any other facilities on the island, which is overrun with vegetation including an abundance of poison ivy. The island is not serviced by the park ferry.
