= Peddocks Island =

Island in Boston Harbor

Coordinates: 42°17′32.60″N 70°56′21.60″W

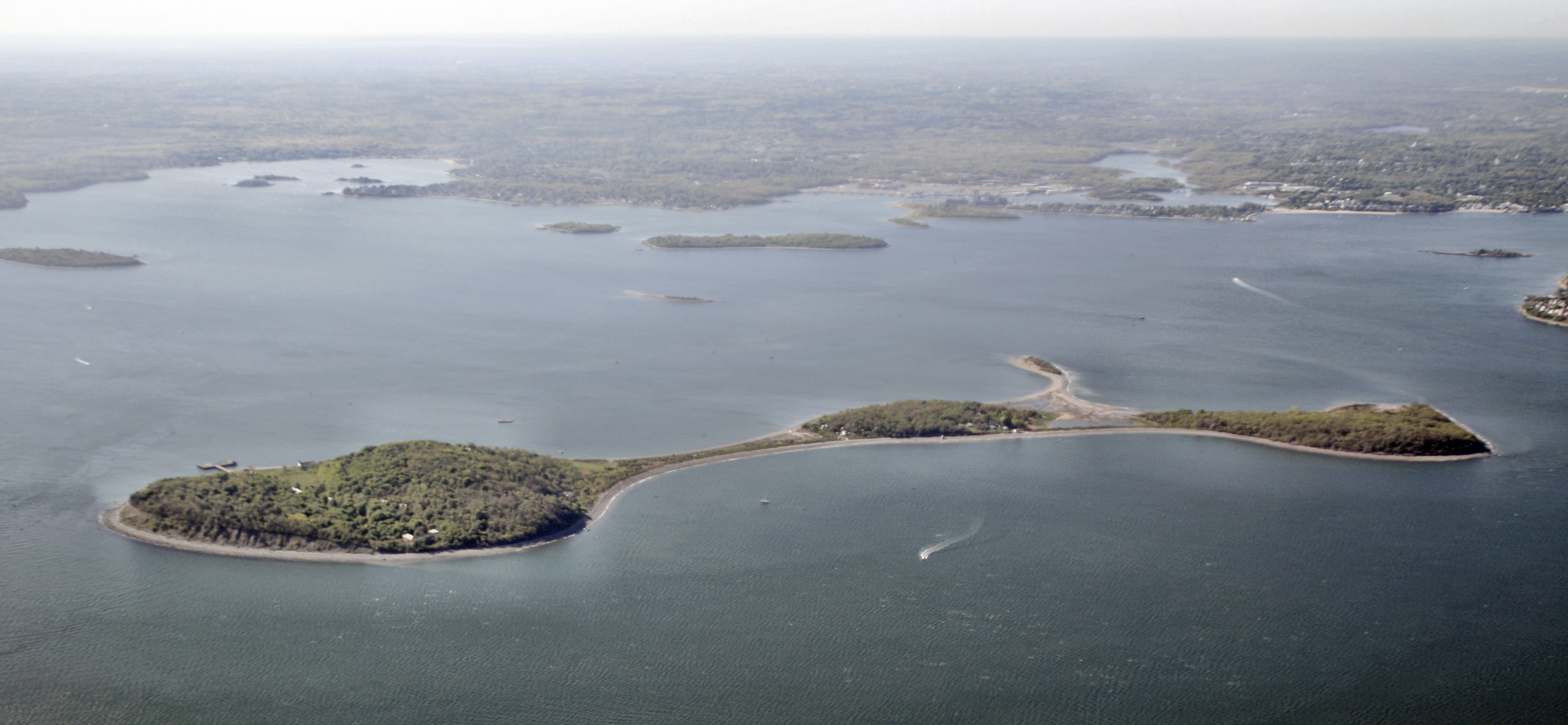
Peddocks Island, with the former Fort Andrews on the left, in East Head.

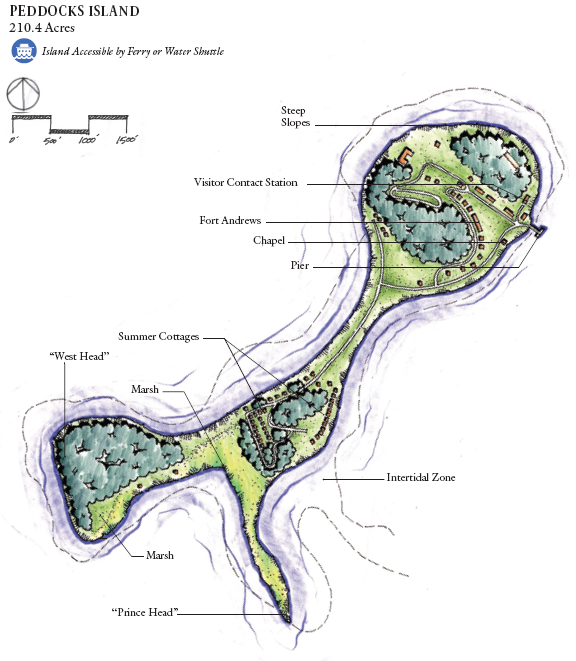
Map of Peddocks Island, provided by the National Park Service.

Peddocks Island is one of the largest islands in Boston Harbor. Since 1996 it has formed part of the Boston Harbor Islands National Recreation Area. Managed by the Department of Conservation and Recreation, the island is home to the now-defunct Fort Andrews, active in harbor defense from 1904 to the end of World War II, on its eastern end, and a group of privately owned cottages on its western end. Campsites are also on the eastern end. Ferry service between Peddocks Island and Georges Island (where Fort Warren stands) is provided on a seasonal basis.

== Topography ==
Peddocks Island lies across Hull Gut from the Pemberton neighborhood of Hull to the north and across West Gut to Nut Island & Houghs Neck to the west. The island is located at 42° 17' 32.6" North latitude and 70° 56' 21.6" West longitude. The area of the island is 210.4 acres (0.851 km^{2}), its total acreage at low tide is 288, and its highest elevation is 80 feet. Boasting the longest island shoreline in Boston Harbor, Peddocks Island comprises four headlands connected by gravel or sand bars known as tombolos.

== History ==
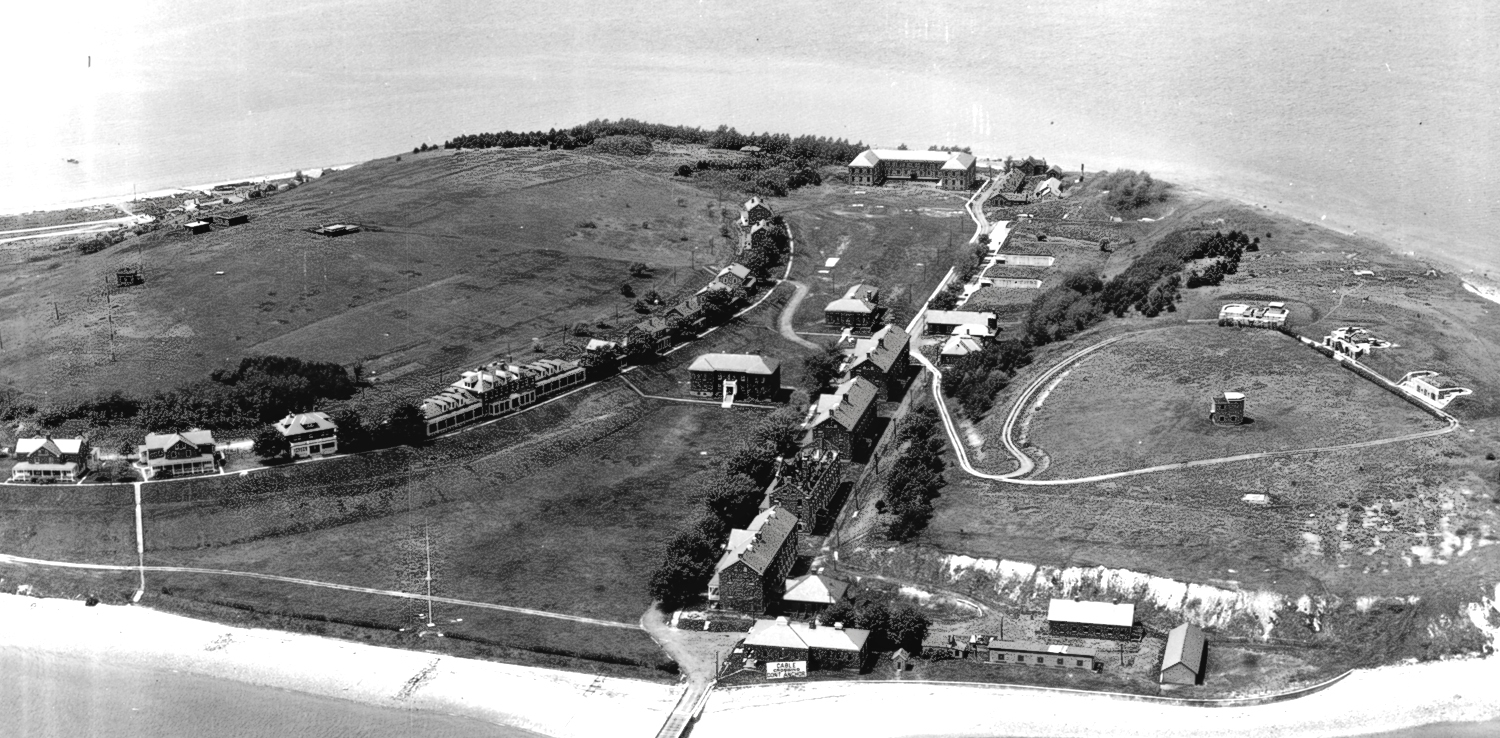
A 1932 Army photo of Fort Andrews.

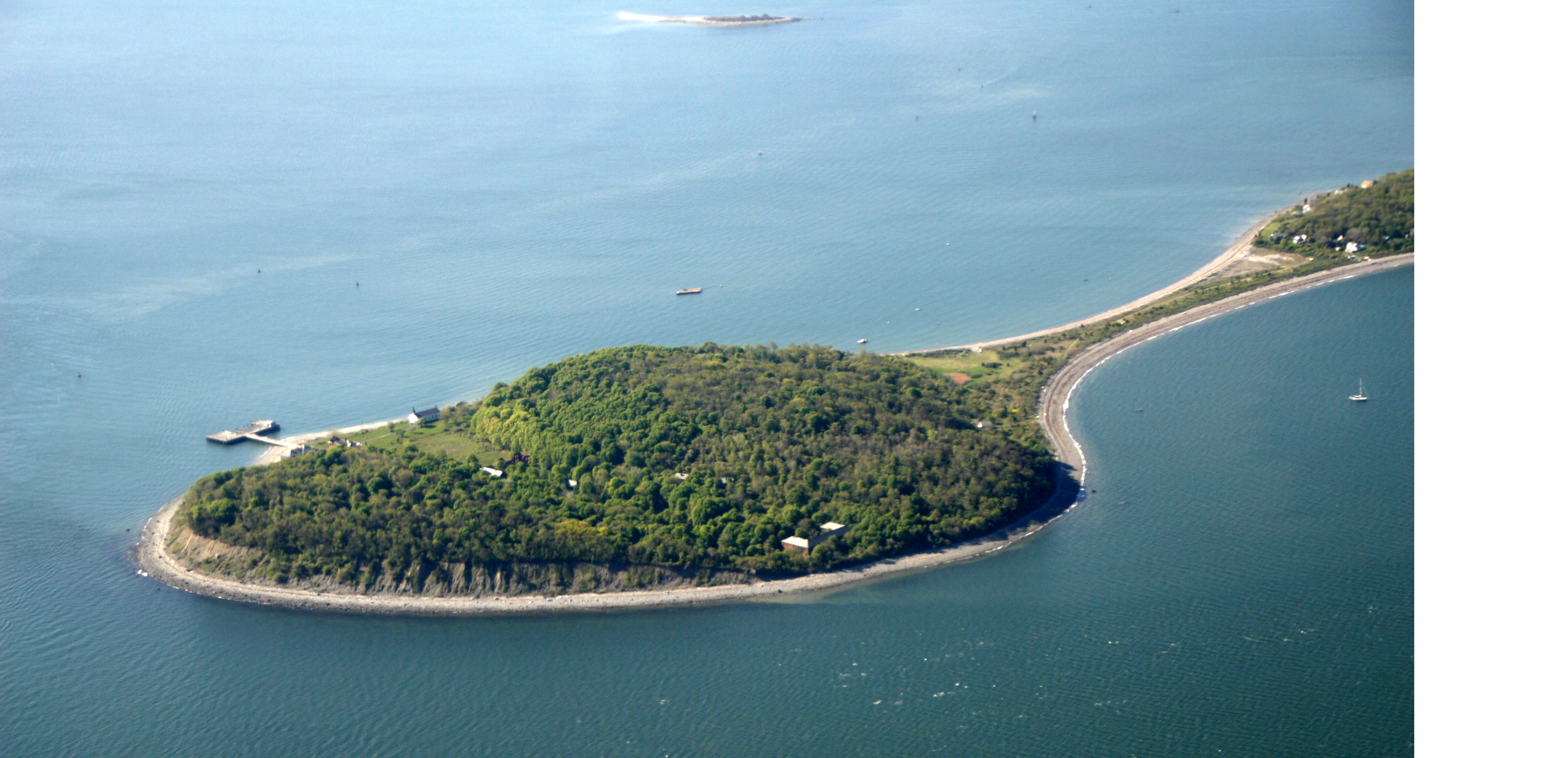
Middle Head and East Head of Peddocks Island.

One of many Boston Harbor Islands inhabited by Native Americans prior to European settlement in America, Peddocks Island is the site of some of the earliest human burials in the Boston area, dated to more than 4000 years before present.

Peddock's Island was primarily used for farming since 1634. Its closeness to mainland Boston enabled its use for military purposes as well. During the American Revolutionary War, more than 600 militiamen were stationed on the island to guard against the return of British troops following their evacuation of Boston by the hand of Gen. George Washington on March 17, 1776. A patriot infantrymen's raid on a Loyalist (Tory) farm is also believed to have taken place on the island.

In 1887, a fishing community, the predecessor to the cottages, started on the island.

In 1904, Fort Andrews was built on the island, and it served as an active harbor defense fort until the end of World War II. As of 2008, 26 of the original buildings of Fort Andrews were still standing — guardhouses, prisoner-of-war barracks, stables, a gymnasium, a firehouse, etc. — although most of them were in decrepit shape and were closed to the public for safety reasons.

In 1993, current cottage owners were granted life tenancy in the park, after which the park would take over the cottages.

In 2008, Peddocks Island was used for filming scenes in Martin Scorsese's Shutter Island, starring Leonardo DiCaprio.

In 2011, Boston granted $7.8 million to renovate the island. This will fund a program in which 11 buildings will be demolished and a further 11 restored, in an attempt to make the island more visitor-friendly as a historical museum and nature reserve. Additionally, walking and hiking trails will be provided, along with tours of the historical buildings.

== Natural resources ==
There is a freshwater marsh on the southern end of Peddocks Island.

Predominant tree and shrub species on the island include maple, birch, oak, pine, poplar, sumac, and apple. The island is also populated with wild roses and poison ivy.

Deer and coyotes are also found on the island.
