= Langlee Island =

Island in Plymouth County, Massachusetts, United States

Coordinates: 42°15′37.49″N 70°53′11.75″W

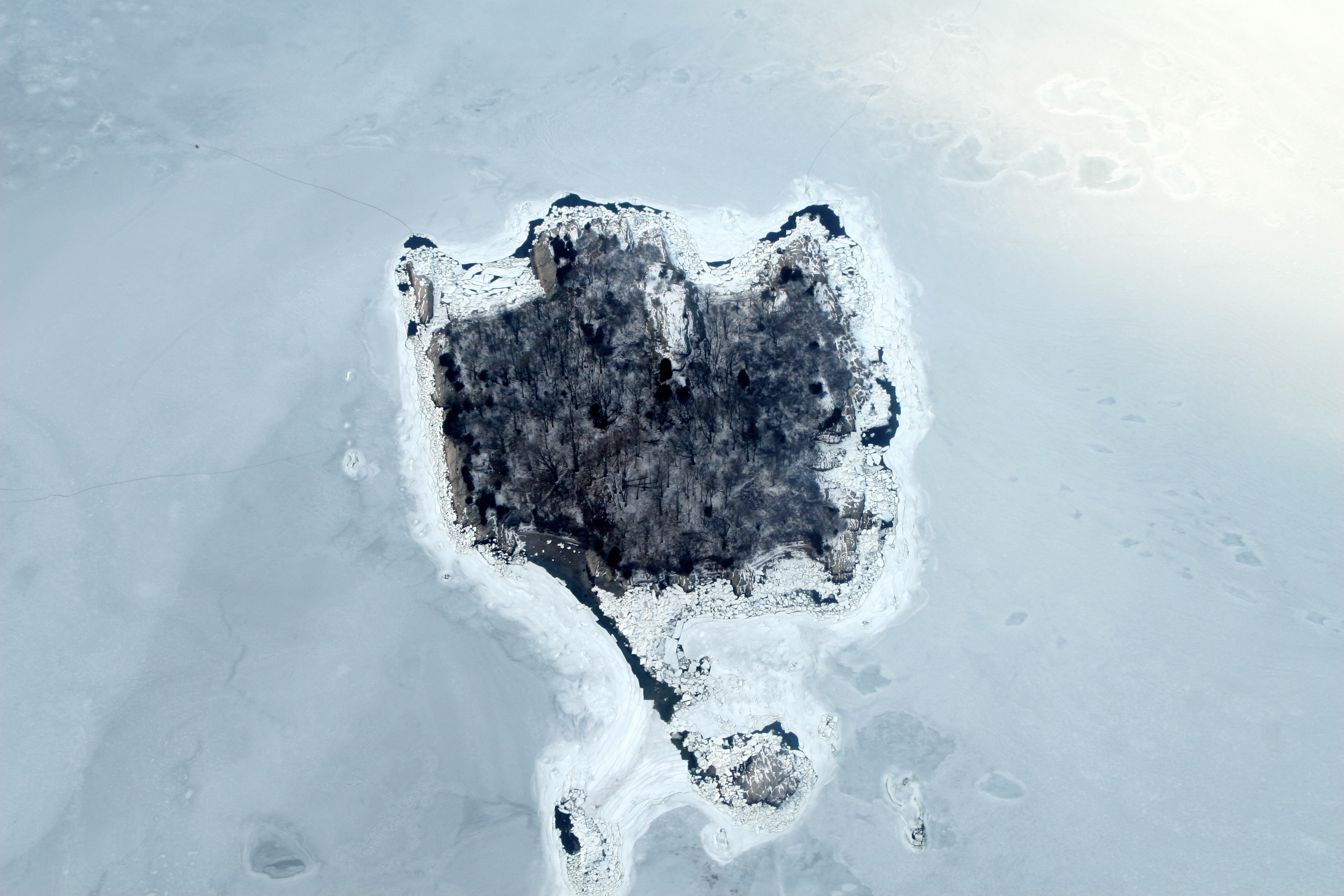
Aerial view of Langlee Island

Langlee Island or Langley Island is an island in the Hingham Bay area of the Boston Harbor Islands National Recreation Area. The island has a permanent size of 4 acres (16,000 m^{2}), plus an intertidal zone of a further 3 acres (12,000 m^{2}), and is composed of a massing of Roxbury puddingstone which rises to a height of 40 feet (12 m) above sea level. This results in steep cliffs on the northern shore, while there are several small sandy beaches and a tidal mudflat on the east side. The center of the island contains glacial till that supports tree and shrub cover. As a result of previous planting, the island hosts large examples of oak, maple, juniper, and birch trees, while self-seeded huckleberry and viburnum mix with common greenbriar, dewberry, sumac, and poison ivy.

The island was purchased by John Langlee in 1689, and has had several private owners since. Eventually, it was given to the town of Hingham by its last private owner, and the town still manages it as part of the National Recreation Area. Access is by private boat only.
