= Sheep Island (Massachusetts) =

Island in Hingham Bay, Boston Harbor, Massachusetts

Coordinates: 42°16′48.3″N 70°55′33.1″W

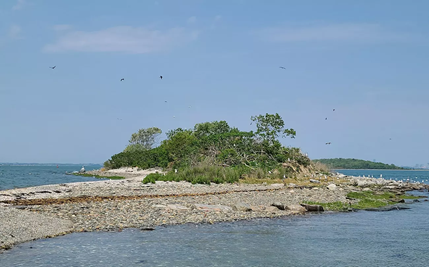
Sheep Island

Sheep Island is a small uninhabited island of about 3.2 acres (1.3 ha) (or less) in Hingham Bay, an outer arm of Boston Harbor. It is within the bounds of the town of Weymouth, Massachusetts, is owned by the Massachusetts Department of Conservation & Recreation, and is part of the Boston Harbor Islands National and State Park.

Sheep Island is an eroded glacial drumlin, long and narrow, the highest elevation being 10 feet (3.0 m). A patch of vegetation grows on the west end, sumac and grasses, and the shoreline is gravel beach. The island was formerly a good deal larger, about 25 acres (10 ha) in early colonial times, and since then has been steadily eroding to its present size.

The island (then called Round Island) was deeded to the town of Weymouth in 1636. In colonial times it was used by the town for grazing sheep. William Chamberlain is the first known owner. In the 19th century people would sometimes camp there, and in the 20th century there was a house and a hunting lodge, belonging to a Mr. Bicknell. No structures remain now.

Sheep Island serves as a nesting ground for local birds. People birdwatch there, but the authorities discourage visits during nesting season (all visits are by private boat, as the island is not served by the park's ferry service). There are unimproved trails but no other amenities.

Sheep Island has also appeared in maps and publications as Shean Island (1759), Sun Island (1775), Sheaf Island (1865), and Ship Island.
