= Raccoon Island (Massachusetts) =

Island in Massachusetts, United States

Coordinates: 42°15′46.01″N 70°56′51.33″W

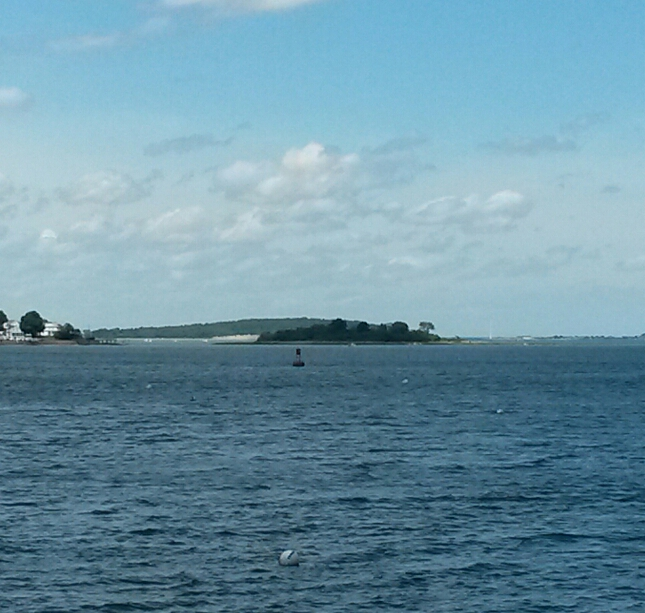
View of Raccoon Island from across the Weymouth Fore River, in North Weymouth, Ma. (Peddock's Island in background)

Raccoon Island is an island in the Hingham Bay area of the Boston Harbor Islands National Recreation Area, situated just offshore of Hough's Neck in the city of Quincy. The island has a permanent size of just under 4 acres (16,000 m^{2}), and is composed of bedrock outcroppings which reach an elevation of 30 feet (9.1 m) above sea level. The island is characterized by gravel beaches and rocky slopes. While it is possible to walk to the island at low tide, public access is discouraged. Raccoon Island used to be named "Sun Island." Both of the names come from unknown origin. In the 1600s the colonist would bring sheep out on the island to let them graze. According to local people from Boston used to camp and hangout on the island in the 1880s. In 1928, it was bought by the Apostolic School in Waltham, apart of the stigmatines, for a summer home for the students. The island no longer has any buildings on it but does have the foundations of a house.
