= George Worthylake =

American lighthouse keeper (1673–1718)

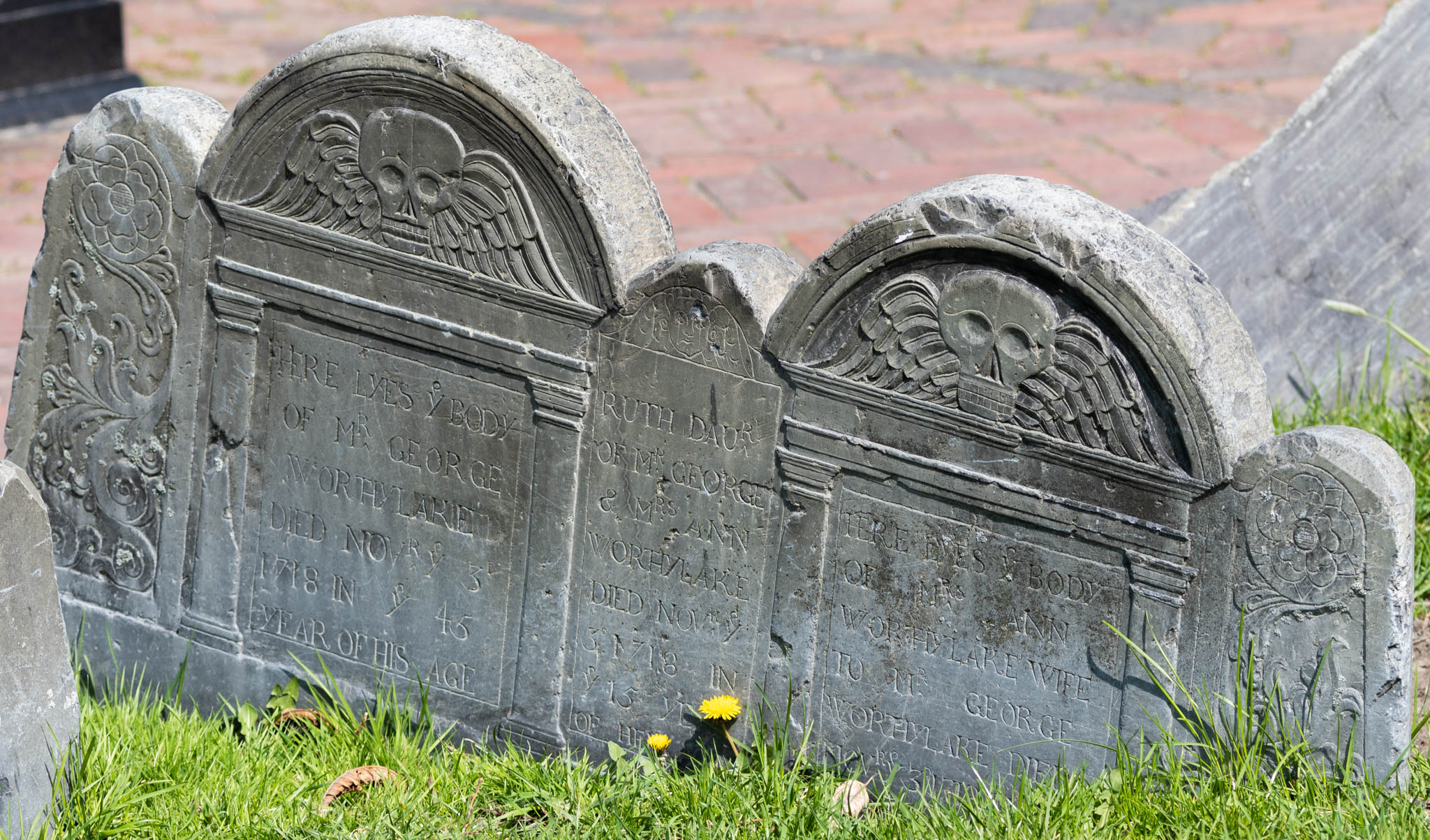
Tomb of the Worthylakes in Copp's Hill Burying Ground

George Worthylake (1673 – November 3, 1718) was the first lighthouse keeper in what was to become the United States. He was also the first to die in the line of duty.

Worthylake was hired as keeper of the Boston Light on Little Brewster Island by the General Court of Massachusetts, at a salary of £50 a year (equivalent to $16,000 today); he was admonished that any dereliction of duty would cost him £100. Besides keeping the light burning from sundown to sunup, he was also expected to serve as a harbor pilot. Worthylake would live on the island with his wife, Ann, and daughter Ruth. He is also known to have kept a flock of sheep on Great Brewster Island; these drowned in a storm in 1717.

On November 3, 1718, Worthylake, his wife Ann, daughter Ruth, servant George Cutler, slave Shadwell, and friend John Edge were returning to the lighthouse after going into Boston to attend a sermon. Upon arrival near the island in a sloop, they alighted in a canoe to transport them to the station. The canoe capsized, and they all drowned. George Cutler's body was never recovered. Benjamin Franklin memorialized the event in his ballad "The Lighthouse Tragedy"; he hawked copies of the poem, printed by his brother, in the streets of Boston. No authenticated copy survives, although a manuscript supposed to be related surfaced in 1940. In that, the poem begins: "Oh! George, This wild November/ We must not pass with you/ For Ruth, our fragile daughter/ It's chilly gales will rue." The manuscript handwriting was evaluated as being in a 19th-century style.

On November 14, 1718, less than two weeks after the Worthylakes had drowned, Robert Saunders, John Chamberlin, and a man named Bradduck were hired to maintain Boston Light until a replacement light-keeper could be appointed. They were summoned by a ship entering the harbor, in choppy seas, and Chamberlin and Bradduck both drowned on their return trip to the island. This event also inspired Franklin in his lighthouse ballad, as Chamberlin was called upon for a trivial reason and not for navigational support.

Worthylake, his wife, and his daughter are buried under an unusual triple headstone in Copp's Hill Burying Ground.

== See also ==
- F. Ross Holland Jr. – author of America's Lighthouses: Their Illustrated History Since 1716
- Sally Snowman – the last keeper of Boston Light
