= Joseph Lewis Cunningham =

Joseph Lewis Cunningham (1784–1843) or J. L. Cunningham worked as an auctioneer in Boston, Massachusetts, in the first half of the 19th century. Among the many lots he sold were birds, horses, real estate, furniture, sea captains' charts, telescopes, American and European artworks, fishing line, feathers, fabric, guns, musical instruments, fruit trees, flower seeds, printers' equipment, and books.

== Biography ==
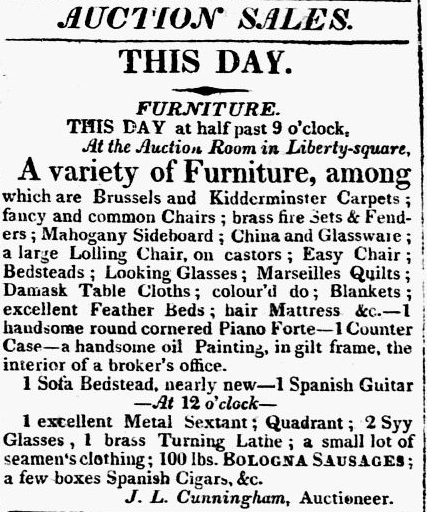
Furniture and 100 pounds of Bologna sausages, 1825

His business partners included John J. Linzee (Linzee & Cunningham, India Wharf) and Lemuel Blake (Blake & Cunningham, "respectable auctioneers and commission merchants").

In the early 1820s he conducted his auctioneering from nos. 2-3 Liberty Square; a fire in 1825 forced him to move. In 1826 he built Corinthian Hall, at the corner of Milk Street and Federal Street, and used "the first floor of the building for his extensive auction rooms." "Mr. J. L. Cunningham has erected a noble building... where formerly stood the mansion... of Judge Paine. It has a number of fine halls in the second and third stories, and on the lower floor, is a spacious and commodious auction room; adjoining which, on each street, are several neat and elegant shops. The halls will be much wanted, and Mr. Cunningham is entitled to some thanks for thus arranging his costly building to the public convenience and accommodation."

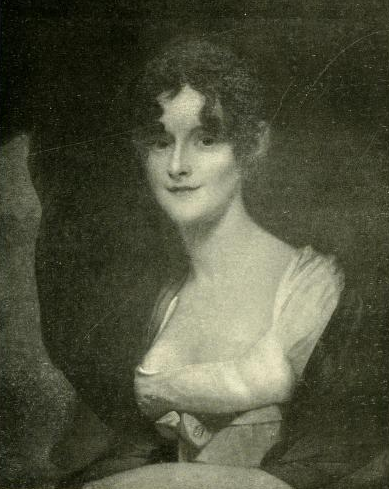
Portrait of Sarah Inman Linzee (1st wife of J.L. Cunningham), by Gilbert Stuart, early 19th century

He married three times, in 1807 to Sarah Inman Linzee (1787-1820), in 1821 to Mary Ann Inman (d.1825), and in 1828 to Catherine Amory. He lived in Boston on Somerset Street (c. 1807) and Bedford Street (c. 1823). He attended Trinity Church.

He died in 1843, and was "buried in vault no.32 under old Trinity Church, Boston, afterwards removed to Mt. Auburn cemetery in Cambridge." A trade auction of "books, stereotype plates and stationery, formerly held by J.L. Cunningham" brought in an "amount... unusually large, between 80 and 100,000 dollars."

== Auctions conducted by J.L Cunningham ==
- 1815
  - "Many thousand volumes of standard European and American publications," "the whole stock of books and stationery of the late firm of West & Blake"
  - "Entire stock of Col. John Boyle, bookseller"
- 1820
  - Library of Jacob Abbot Cummings (Blake & Cunningham)
- 1821
  - "Collection of cabinet paintings... Many of them have adorned the galleries of the Duke of Buckingham, Marquis of Stafford, Cardinal Woolsey, Lord Fife, Henry Hope, &c." 164 works, including (copies of) Rembrandt's "Achilles;" Titian; Watteau's "Garden at Versailles;" Thomas Sully's "Taking of Major Andre" at Doggett's Repository of Arts (Blake & Cunningham)

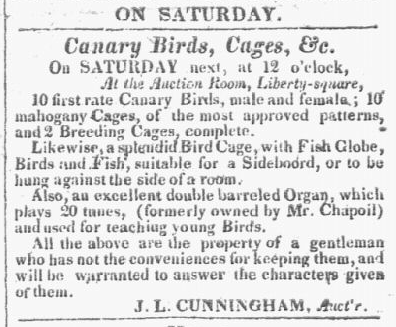
Canary birds, 1824

- 1823
  - "Furniture of a lady leaving the city," including "astral lamp - portable desk - an elegant urn"
  - Furniture of "a gentleman removing from the city"
  - "330 bales Russia feathers"
  - "Family horse and chaise"
- 1824
  - "50 dozen 18-thread cod lines... 5 sacks first quality live geese feathers"
  - "Stock of a rectifier of spirits"
  - "Cider and porter bottles, China ware, Naples soap, and brushes"
  - "Swedish iron"
  - "Music types"
  - "Paintings by some of the old masters, in handsome gilt frames, some of which were recently imported from London... Titian, Rubens, De Heem, Ruysdaal, Vanderveld, Brughel, Wouvermans;" also marble busts of Rubens and Raphael. At Doggett's Repository
  - "Madras handkerchiefs, splendid patterns"
  - "Canary birds, cages, &c."
  - "Furniture for a grocery store, such as standing casks and kegs, scales and weights, lot of measures, tea canisters, counters and drawers, empty pipes and barrels, stone jars"
  - "That valuable parcel of real estate, lately the property of Rebekah Parrott, deceased, situate at the corner of Liberty-square and Kilby"
  - "4 cases of preserved insects"
  - "Nautical instruments, charts, &c... of the late Capt. Charles S. Winship"
  - "Parlor fenders"
  - "A small, handsome, and well-broke poney, with an English-built gig"
  - "Six oven stoves, new"
  - "300 roles of French paper hangings... Also - a printing press"

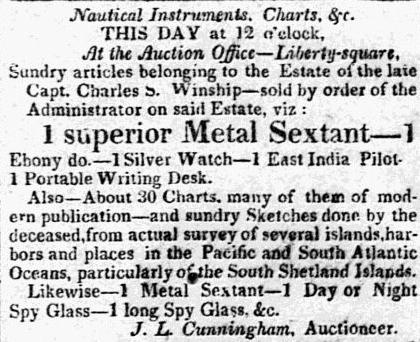
"Nautical instruments, charts, &c... of the late Capt. Charles S. Winship," 1824

- 1825
  - Art collection of "N. Delvaltooth;" including works by (or after) Claude Lorrain, Rembrandt, Watteau.
  - "1 brass turning lathe; a small lot of seamen's clothing; 100 lbs. Bologna sausages; a few boxes of Spanish cigars, &c."
  - "Shares in the South Boston Bridge Corporation... Shares in the Dorchester Turnpike Corporation" at Merchant's Hall
  - "Cabinet stock... at the cabinet manufactory of the late Thomas Emmons"
  - "Splendid collection of alabaster ornaments" at Concert Hall
  - Furniture; "also - a pair of duelling pistols; ... ebony German flute; ... gold watch; ... 3 boxes French cordials" at "the Julien Auction Room, corner of Milk and Congress-streets"
- 1826
  - Furniture of the Tontine Coffee House, Washington St.
  - "200 looking glasses"
- 1829
  - "600 double tulips, and 100 ranunculus roots, just received per Agnes, from London"
- 1841
  - "The celebrated Conway Medicines... recipes, medicines prepared and ready to be sent out"
  - "Private library... of a gentleman deceased... A solar microscope"
  - "Valuable cow and calf"
  - "Elegant oil paintings... 64... original pictures and facsimile copies... from some of the most celebrated pictures in... the Louvre, the Hague and Amsterdam" at Harding's Gallery
  - "That valuable estate, no.57 Mount Vernon Street," Beacon Hill
- 1842
  - "Collection of beautiful green-house plants - among them many fine varieties of roses, callas, verbenas, heliotropes, azalias"
  - "French fruit trees, just imported... varieties of... apples, plums, apricots, cherries, peaches, and grape vines"
  - "Dutch canary birds, chiefly good singers"
  - "Parlor organs"
  - "About 30 oil paintings, recently finished by C. Drew... views of well known places in America, chiefly in the neighborhood of Boston: among them several views of Boston Light, storm, shipwreck, several views of the coast of England, &c."
