= Calf Island (Massachusetts) =

Island in Massachusetts, United States

Coordinates: 42°20′23.80″N 70°53′46.17″W

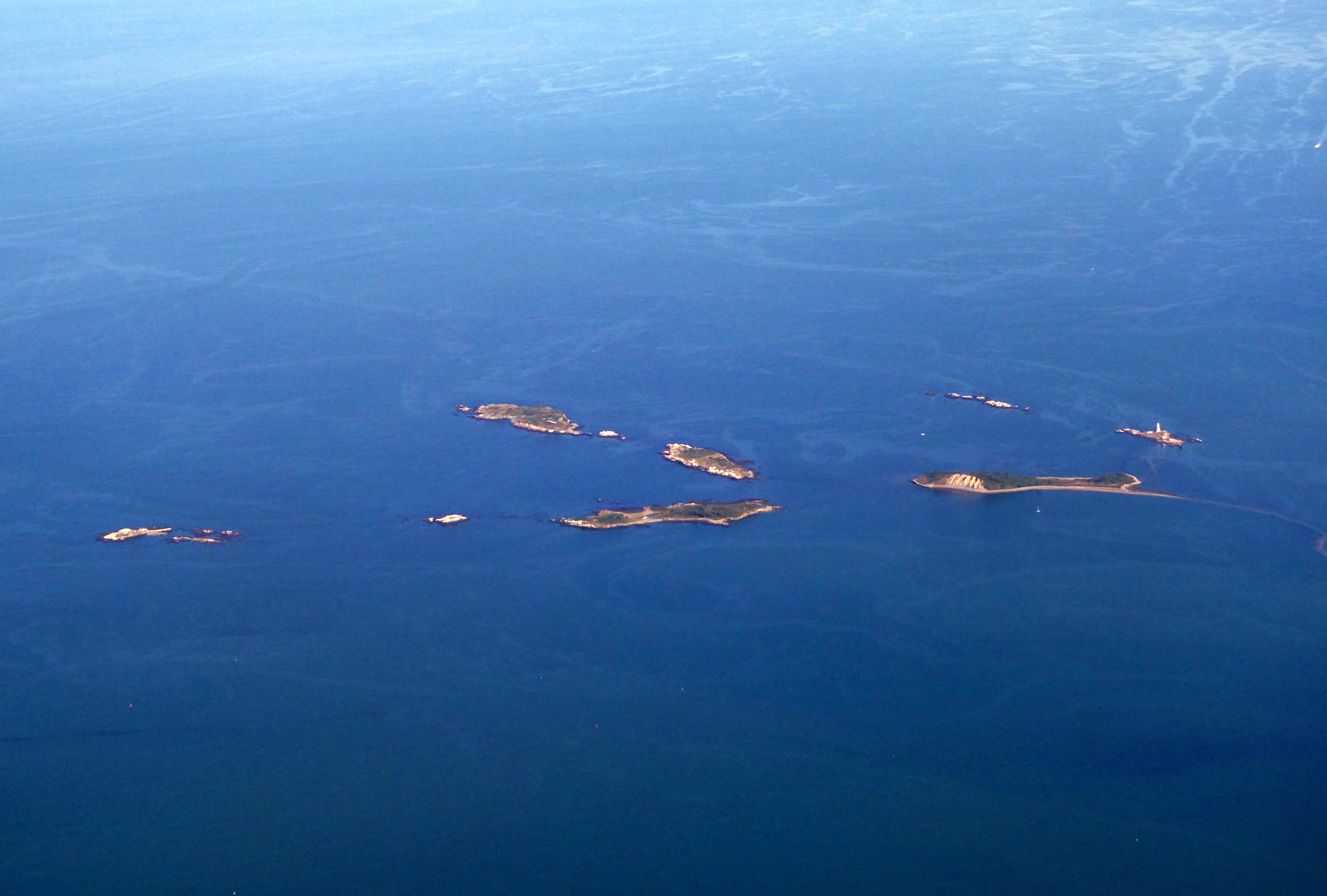
Calf Island (the closest island at center) and surroundings in 2024

Calf Island, also known as Apthorps Island, is an island situated some 9 miles (14 km) offshore of downtown Boston in Boston Harbor Islands National and State Park. The island has a permanent size of 18 acres (73,000 m^{2}), plus an intertidal zone of a further 16 acres (65,000 m^{2}).

The island is not served by public ferries. Access by private boat may be hazardous and is not recommended.

In the 17th century the island was granted to William Brewster of Plymouth Colony, after whom the adjacent islands of Great Brewster, Little Brewster, Middle Brewster and Outer Brewster are named. Subsequently, it was owned by Charles Apthorp who also owned Long Island and other property in the harbor. Over the years, several huts and houses were built on the island, including a colonial style summer estate built by Benjamin P. Cheney, Jr. and his wife, actress Julia Arthur, in 1902. Today only ruins remain.

Illegal boxing matches were staged on the island in the late 19th century.

In the 1920s, the Army planned to install a pair of 16-inch (410 mm) guns on Calf Island as part of the Harbor Defenses of Boston, along with 16-inch (410 mm) gun batteries on Deer Island (now underneath the Deer Island Waste Water Treatment Plant) and Hog Island (now called Spinnaker Island), to cover the seaward approaches to Boston Harbor. The battery on Calf Island was never built.

The center of the island contains a freshwater marsh. The thin soil layer supports grasses, shrubs and salt-tolerant trees. Some of the plant species found on the island include wild cherry, beach plum, and mock orange.
