= Green Island (Massachusetts) =

Island in Suffolk County, Massachusetts, United States

Coordinates: 42°21′08.10″N 70°53′30.10″W

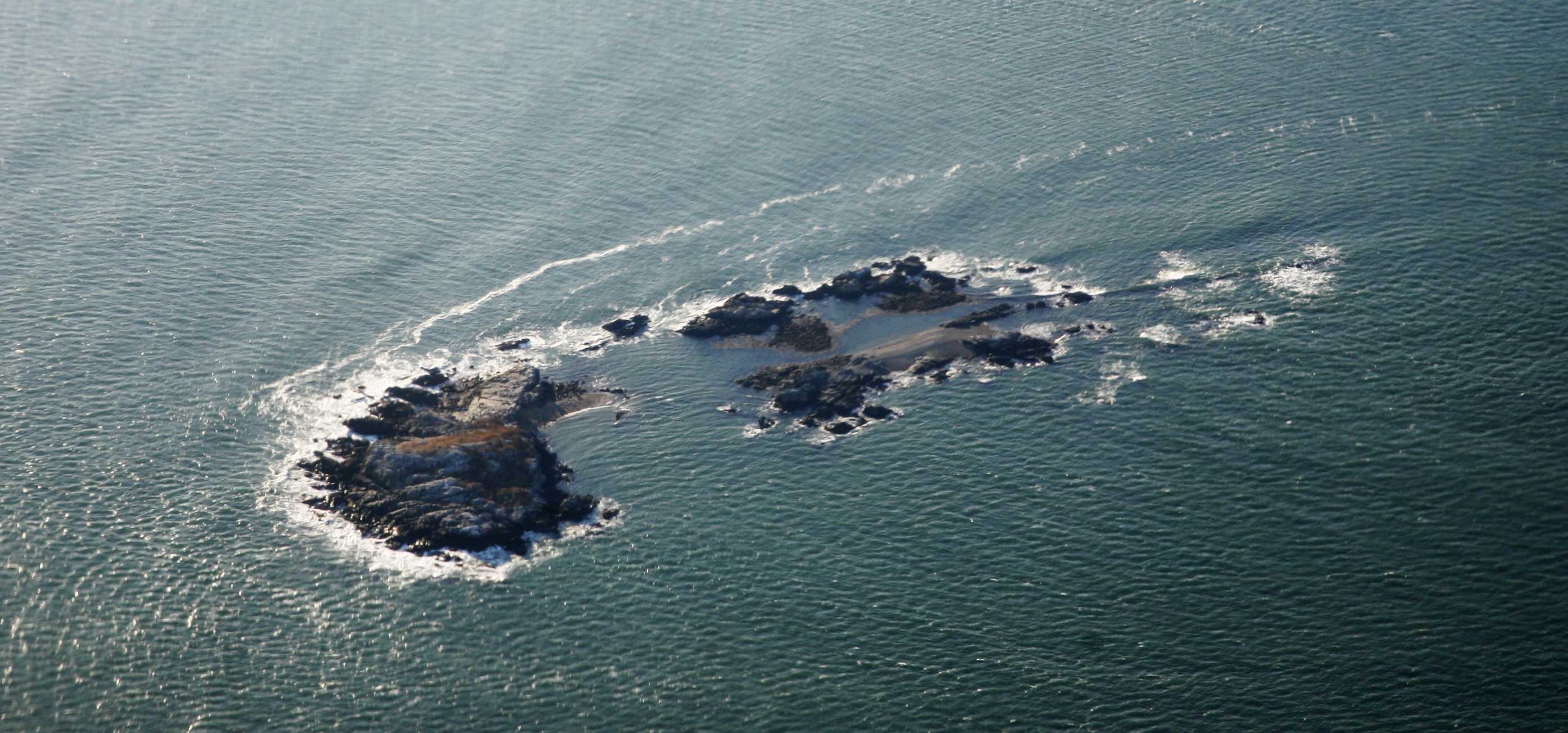
Green Island in 2009

Green Island, also known as North Brewster Island, is a rocky outer island in the Boston Harbor Islands National Recreation Area, to the north of Calf Island and Hypocrite Channel. The island has a permanent size of 2.5 acres (10,000 m^{2}), plus an intertidal zone of a further 15 acres (61,000 m^{2}), and is exposed from the east and northeast with little soil or plant life. The island is named after Joseph Green, a well-known merchant, who owned the island during Colonial times.

Green Island is a nesting area for herring gulls, black-backed gulls, cormorants, barn swallows, red-winged blackbirds, and rats. The island is a popular location for striped bass fishermen during the summer months. However, access by humans is difficult, and especially discouraged during the birds' nesting season.

== History ==
Due to the severity of the cold weather during the winter of 1865, Samuel Choat had to be removed from Green Island. He was 70 years of age at the time. On February 8, Choat was transferred to the State Almshouse in Bridgewater where he died on February 23, 1865.

== See also ==
- Great Brewster
- Little Brewster
- Middle Brewster
- Outer Brewster
- Long Island
