= Hypocrite Channel =

Water channel in Boston, Massachusetts, United States

Coordinates: 42°20′51.71″N 70°53′40.26″W

The Hypocrite Channel is a small channel in Massachusetts Bay, located within the city limits of Boston. It's also located within the Boston Harbor Islands National Recreation Area. The channel runs between the islands of Half Tide Rocks, Calf Island, Little Calf Island, and Green Island.
