= Doggett's Repository of Arts =

Former Massachusetts art gallery

Coordinates: 42°21′34.58″N 71°3′27.81″W

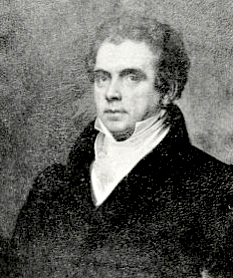
Portrait of John Doggett, proprietor, 19th century

Doggett's Repository of Arts (c. 1821-1825) was an art gallery in Boston, Massachusetts, United States, located at 16 Market Street. Its proprietor, John Doggett, was a gilder and framer with a retail shop near the gallery (nos.18 and 20 Market Street). The gallery exhibited originals and copies of works by European masters such as Titian, Rembrandt, Watteau, and David, and a few American artists, such as Thomas Sully, Gilbert Stuart, Samuel F.B. Morse, Rembrandt Peale, and William Dunlap. By July 1825, the gallery was converted into retail space for Doggett's frame, mirror and carpet business.

== Exhibitions ==
- 1821
  - November - "Collection of cabinet paintings. ... Many of them have adorned the galleries of the Duke of Buckingham, Marquis of Stafford, Cardinal Woolsey, Lord Fife, Henry Hope, &c." 164 works, including (copies of) Rembrandt's "Achilles;" Titian; Watteau's "Garden at Versailles;" Sully's "Taking of Major Andre." Auctioned by Blake & Cunningham, Nov. 22
- 1822
  - March - Gilbert Stuart's portraits of "the five presidents of the United States:" George Washington, John Adams, Thomas Jefferson, James Madison, and James Monroe
  - July - "The grand, new and original historical painting, representing the sufferings, death and burial of our lord and saviour Jesus Christ, containing 21 figures as large as life, and occupying more than 300 square feet (28 m^{2}) of canvas."
  - October - William Dunlap's Christ rejected by the high priest and elders
- 1823
  - February - Samuel F.B. Morse's view of the U.S. House of Representatives
  - April - Thomas Sully's The Passage of the Delaware
  - August - Egyptian mummy: a "curious relic of antiquity, together with the sarcophagi in which it was contained, when taken from the catacombs of ancient Thebes"
  - August - Rembrandt Peale's Court of Death
  - December - Thomas Sully's Capuchin Chapel
  - December - "Stollenwerk's mechanical and picturesque panorama": "a commercial city, with its active citizens, merchants, mechanicks, labourers, beggars and promenaders, together with ships, boats, &c. are seen at one view, and put in motion by machinery"
- 1824
  - April - "French and Italian engravings, just imported from France;" auctioned by J.L Cunningham
  - July - "Paintings by some of the old masters, in handsome gilt frames, some of which were recently imported from London. ... Titian, Rubens, De Heem, Ruysdaal, Vanderveld, Brughel, Wouvermans;" also marble busts of Rubens and Raphael. Auctioned by J.L Cunningham on July 16.
  - October - Jacques-Louis David's Cain meditating the death of his brother Abel

== Image gallery ==
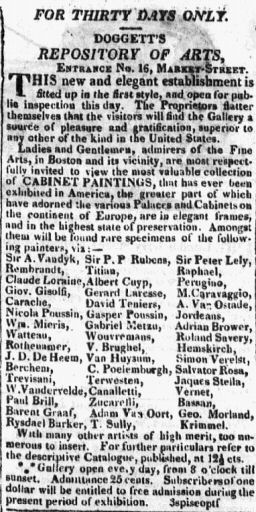
Advertisement for exhibit of European masters, 1821

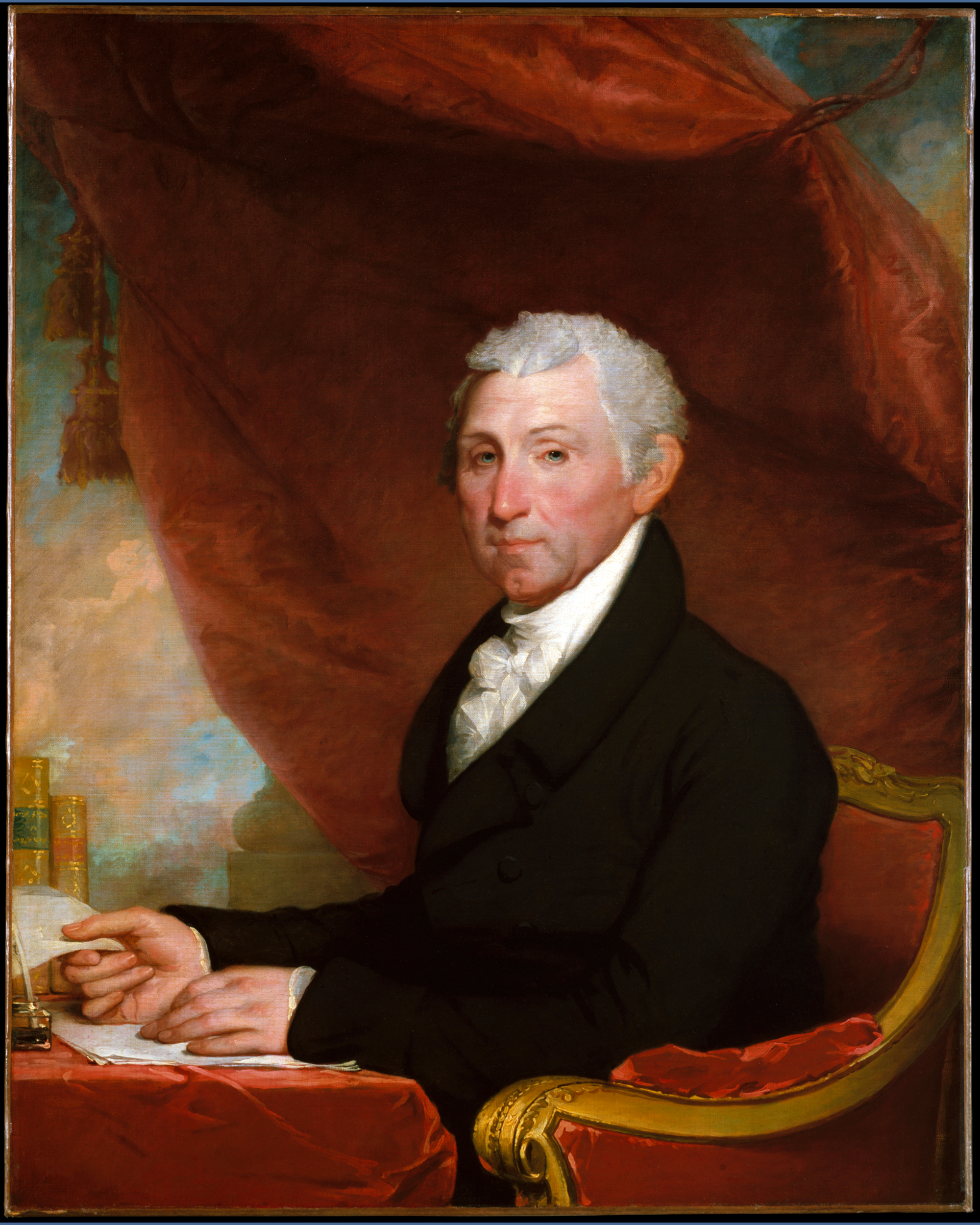
Gilbert Stuart's portrait of U.S. president James Monroe (c. 1820-1822), exhibited 1822 (Metropolitan Museum of Art, NY)

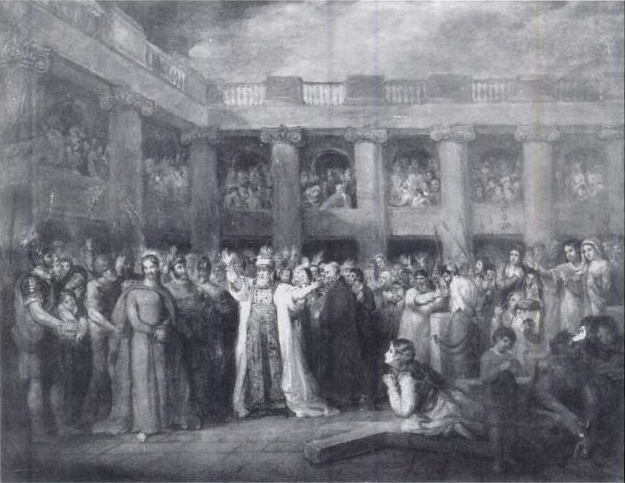
Dunlap's Christ Rejected (1822), exhibited 1822 (Princeton University)

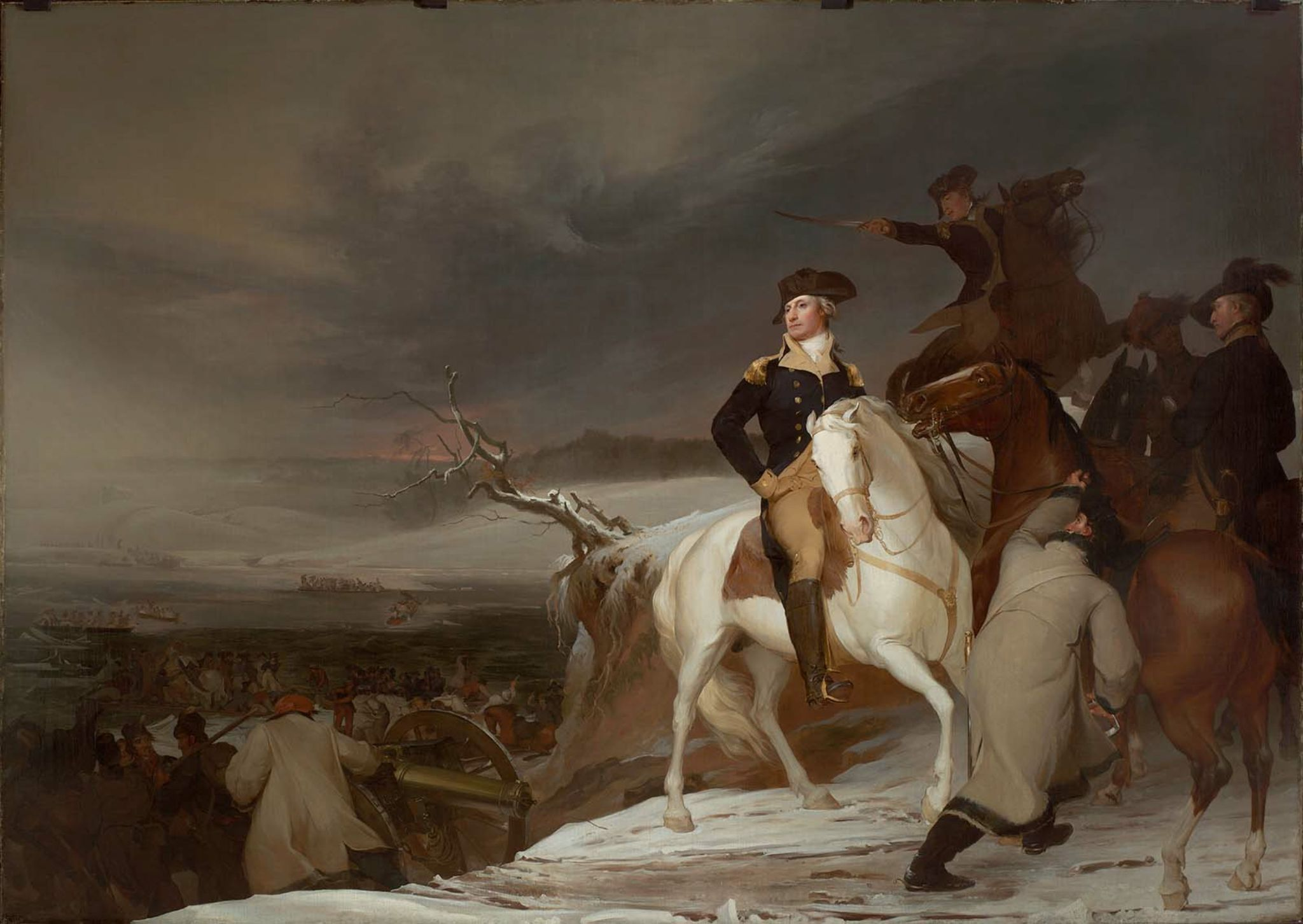
Thomas Sully's The Passage of the Delaware (1819), exhibited 1823 (Museum of Fine Arts, Boston)

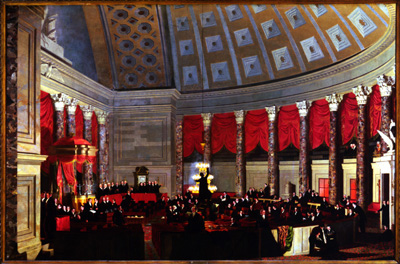
Morse's House of Representatives (1822-1823), exhibited 1823 (Corcoran Museum of Art)

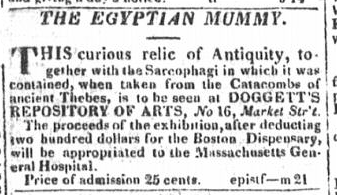
Advertisement for Egyptian mummy, 1823; proceeds to benefit the Boston Dispensary and Massachusetts General Hospital

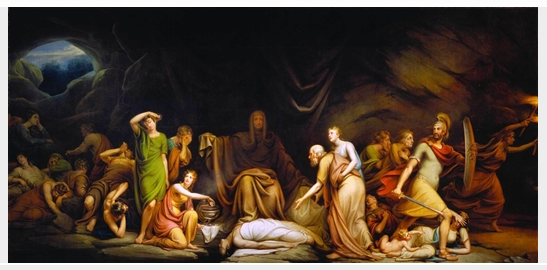
Peale's Court of Death (1820), exhibited 1823 (Detroit Institute of Arts)

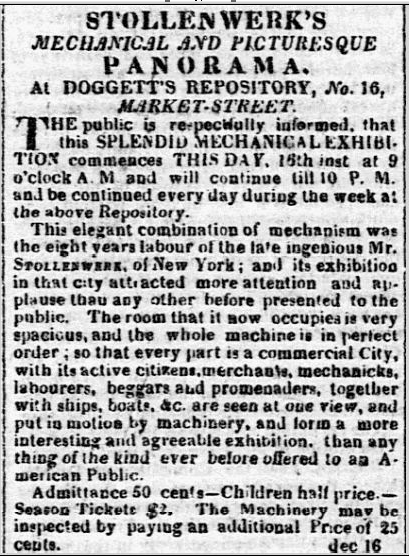
Advertisement for Stollenwerk's mechanical panorama, exhibited 1823-1825

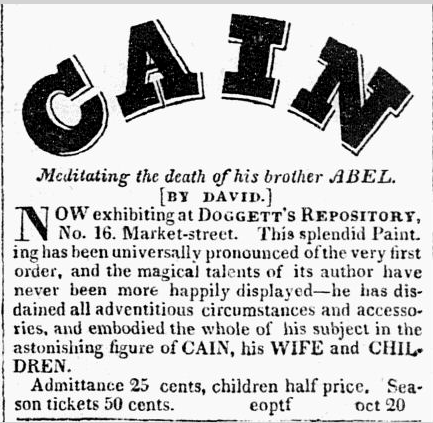
Advertisement for exhibit of David's "Cain meditating the death of his brother Abel", 1824

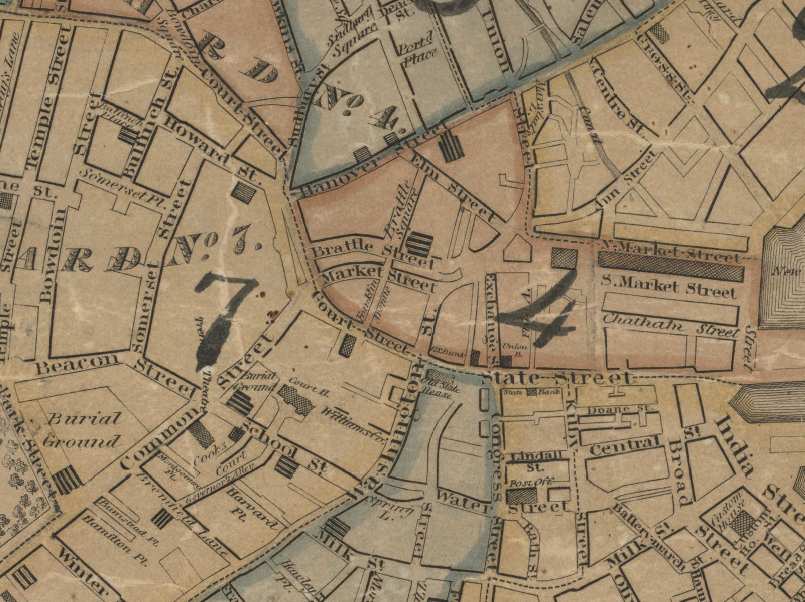
Detail of 1826 map of Boston, showing Market Street, near Brattle, Court, and Washington Streets, on the future site of Boston City Hall and City Hall Plaza in Government Center
