= Jacob Abbot Cummings =

Jacob Abbot Cummings (1773–1820) was a bookseller, publisher, schoolteacher and author in Boston, Massachusetts, in the early 19th-century.

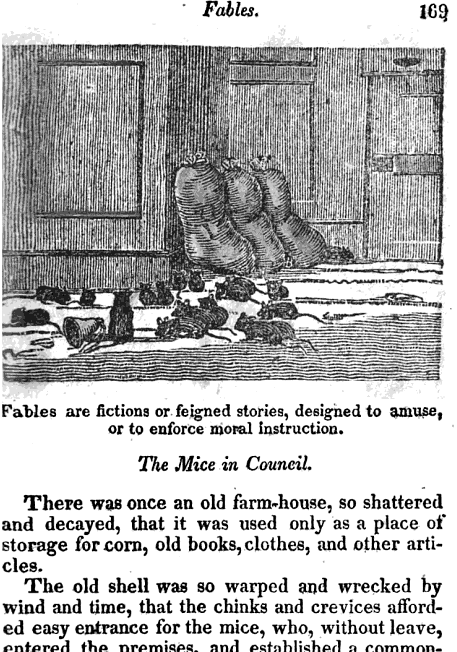
"The mice in council" from Cummings' Pronouncing Spelling Book, 1823

== Biography ==
Born in Hollis, New Hampshire, to Ebenezer Cummings and Elizabeth Abbot, Jacob attended Harvard University (class of 1801). In 1809 he married Elizabeth Merrill; their children were James Merrill (b. 1810) and John S. (1812–1813).

As a bookseller and publisher, his business partners included William Andrews (Andrews & Cummings, 1807–1809) and William Hilliard (Cummings & Hilliard, 1812–1820)

Cummings "kept a school for both girls and boys" in Boston. He "seems to have been ahead of his time in both the style and content of his teaching. ... He wrote a textbook, An Introduction to Ancient and Modern Geography, giving something of his pedagogical philosophy in the preface. 'It will not be profitable to confine the young mind long to any one part of the earth. ... No small injury is frequently done to young persons, by attempting to make them perfect in what they the first time commit to memory, especially if it be somewhat difficult.'" He also liked the bible "as a reading text because of its simple dialogue, short sentences, frequent transitions, and interesting narrative. He wrote that the children kept 'hoping on every perusal that scenes of sorrow and death may be reversed and the innocent sufferer escape.'"

After his death in 1820, Cummings' "private library" was auctioned at the office of Blake & Cunningham on Kilby Street in Boston.

== See also ==
- List of booksellers in Boston

== Images ==
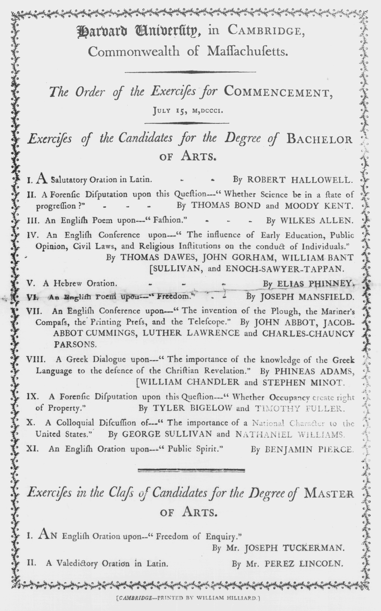
Harvard commencement, 1801

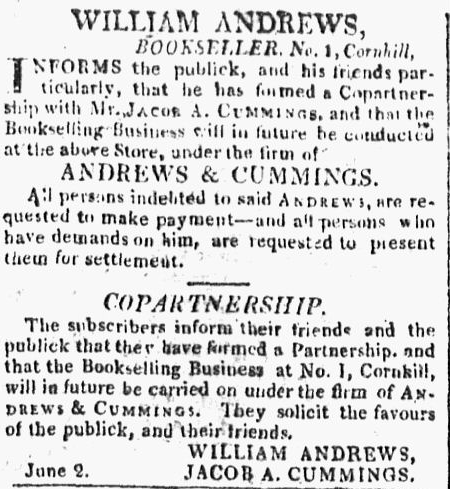
Andrews & Cummings, booksellers, no.1 Cornhill, Boston, 1807

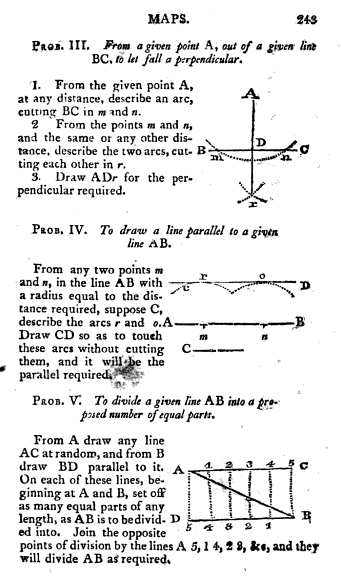
From Cummings' Introduction to Ancient and Modern Geography, 1815

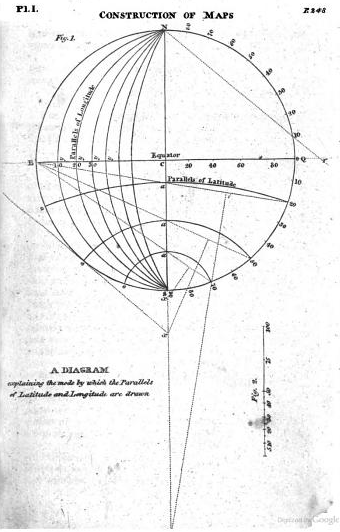
From Cummings' Introduction to ancient and modern geography, 1821

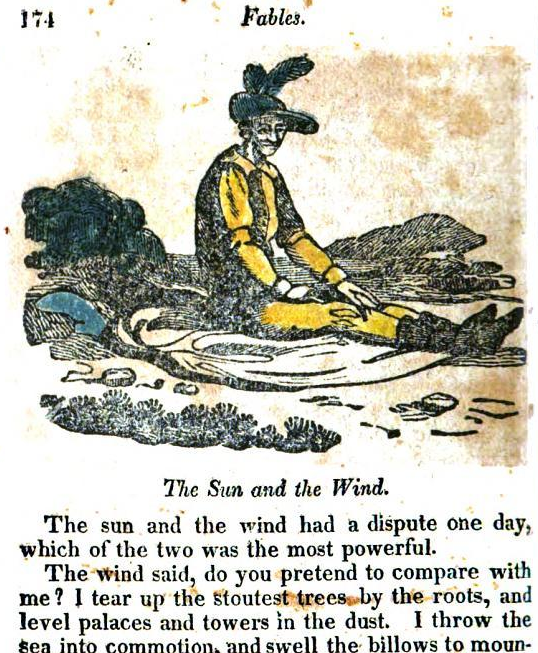
From Cummings' Pronouncing Spelling Book, 1823
