= Sally Snowman =

Last American lighthouse keeper

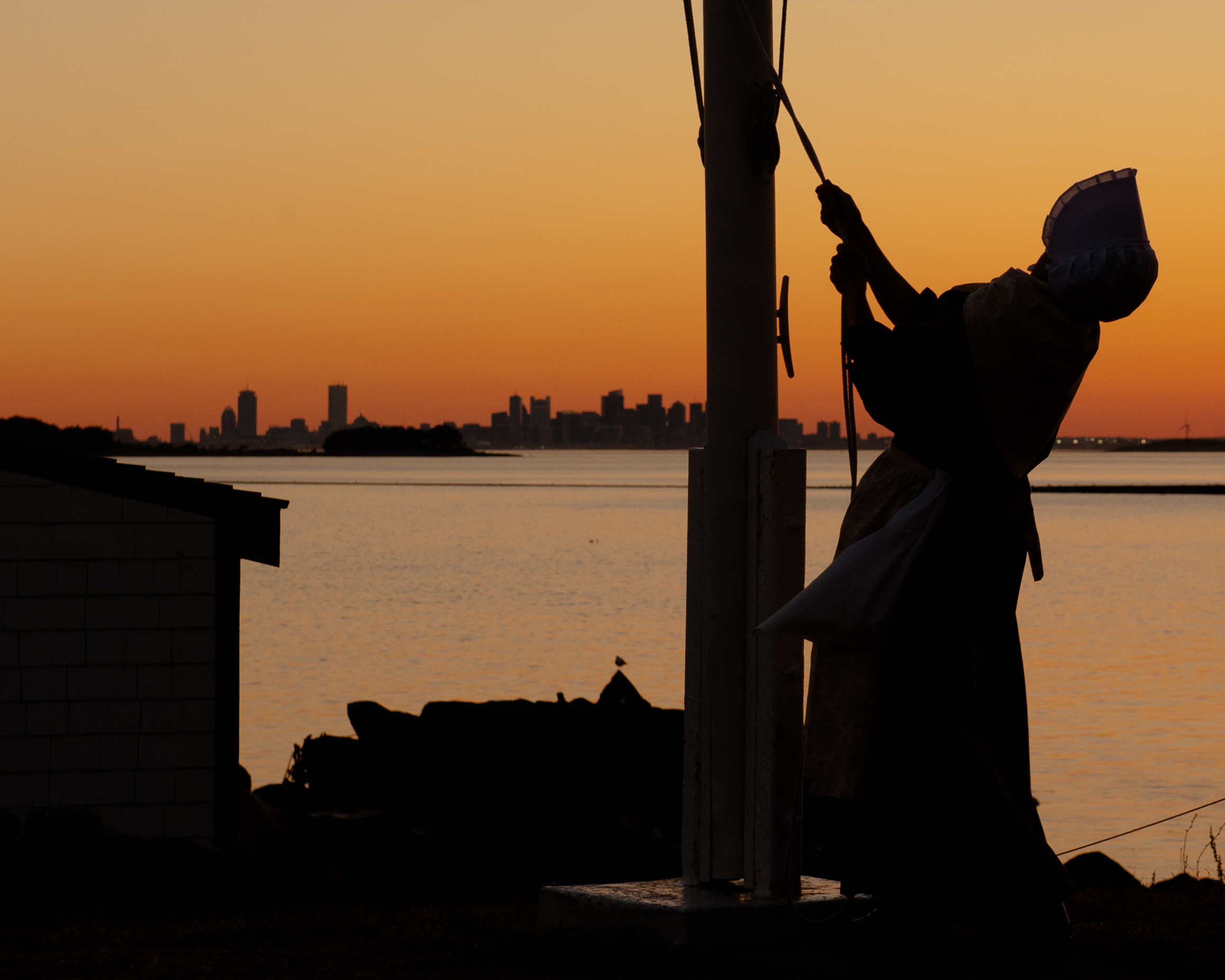
U.S. Coast Guard photo of Snowman (2016)

Sally Snowman (aged 72 as of December 30, 2023, her retirement date) was the last keeper of the Boston Light, a lighthouse in Boston Harbor on Little Brewster Island. As of December 30, 2023, Snowman has retired and is expected to be the last official lighthouse keeper ever in the U.S.

== Personal life and career ==
Snowman has lived near Boston Harbor since she was a child and first visited Little Brewster Island at age 10. She was married there to Jay Thompson in 1994 and they live in Weymouth, Massachusetts when not staying at the light.

She earned a B.S. at Bridgewater State College, and a Masters in education at Curry College. She then worked as a teacher while earning a Ph.D. in neurolinguistics from Walden University. She volunteered for 30 years for the Coast Guard Auxiliary, where she first met Thompson. In 2003, she was hired by the Coast Guard as a civilian, becoming the first woman and the seventieth keeper of the Boston Light.

== See also ==
- George Worthylake - the first keeper of the Boston Light in 1718
