= Middle Brewster Island =

Island in Suffolk County, Massachusetts, United States

Coordinates: 42°20′18.38″N 70°53′17.59″W

Middle Brewster Island is a rugged outer island in the Boston Harbor Islands National Recreation Area, located 9 miles (14 km) offshore from downtown Boston. The island has a permanent size of 13 acres (53,000 m^{2}), reaches a height of 52 feet (16 m) above sea level, and is bounded by sharp cliffs and sunken crags. It has only sparse vegetation and serves primarily as a nesting site for gulls and cormorants. The birds are aggressive during their nesting season and access by humans is discouraged during this period. Access is difficult due to the lack of beaches and inlets, and is only accessible by private boat.

Like the neighboring islands of Great Brewster, Little Brewster and Outer Brewster, Middle Brewster Island is named after William Brewster, the first preacher and teacher for the Plymouth Colony. During the 18th century the island hosted a fisherman's colony, and was used as a summer retreat by some Boston residents during the 19th century. Remains of the homes remain, including fireplaces, stone walls, and an arch that once supported a bell.

== See also ==
- Green Island (Massachusetts)
- Long Island
