= Outer Brewster Island =

Island in Suffolk County, Massachusetts, United States

Coordinates: 42°20′30.41″N 70°52′39.65″W

Outer Brewster Island, also known as Outward Island, is one of the outer islands in the Boston Harbor Islands National Recreation Area and is situated some 10 miles (16 km) offshore of downtown Boston. The island has a permanent size of 20 acres (8.1 ha), and consists of exposed bedrock covered by fertile soil bounded by a rocky shore with steep cliffs. It provides a nesting habitat for coastal water birds, including cormorants, gulls, common eider ducks, glossy ibis and American oystercatchers. The birds are aggressive during their nesting season and access by humans, which is by private boat only, is discouraged during this period.

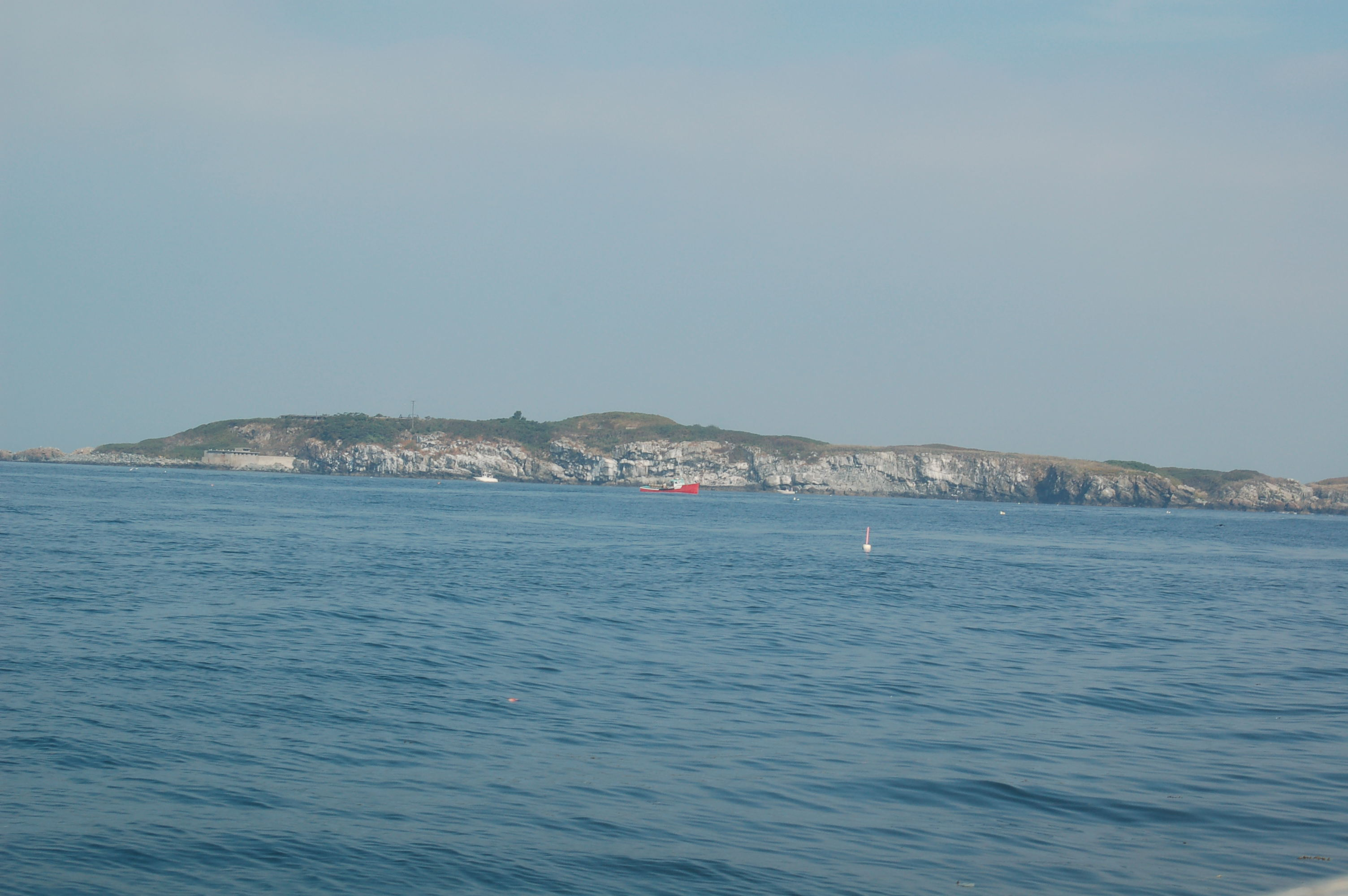
Outer Brewster Island.

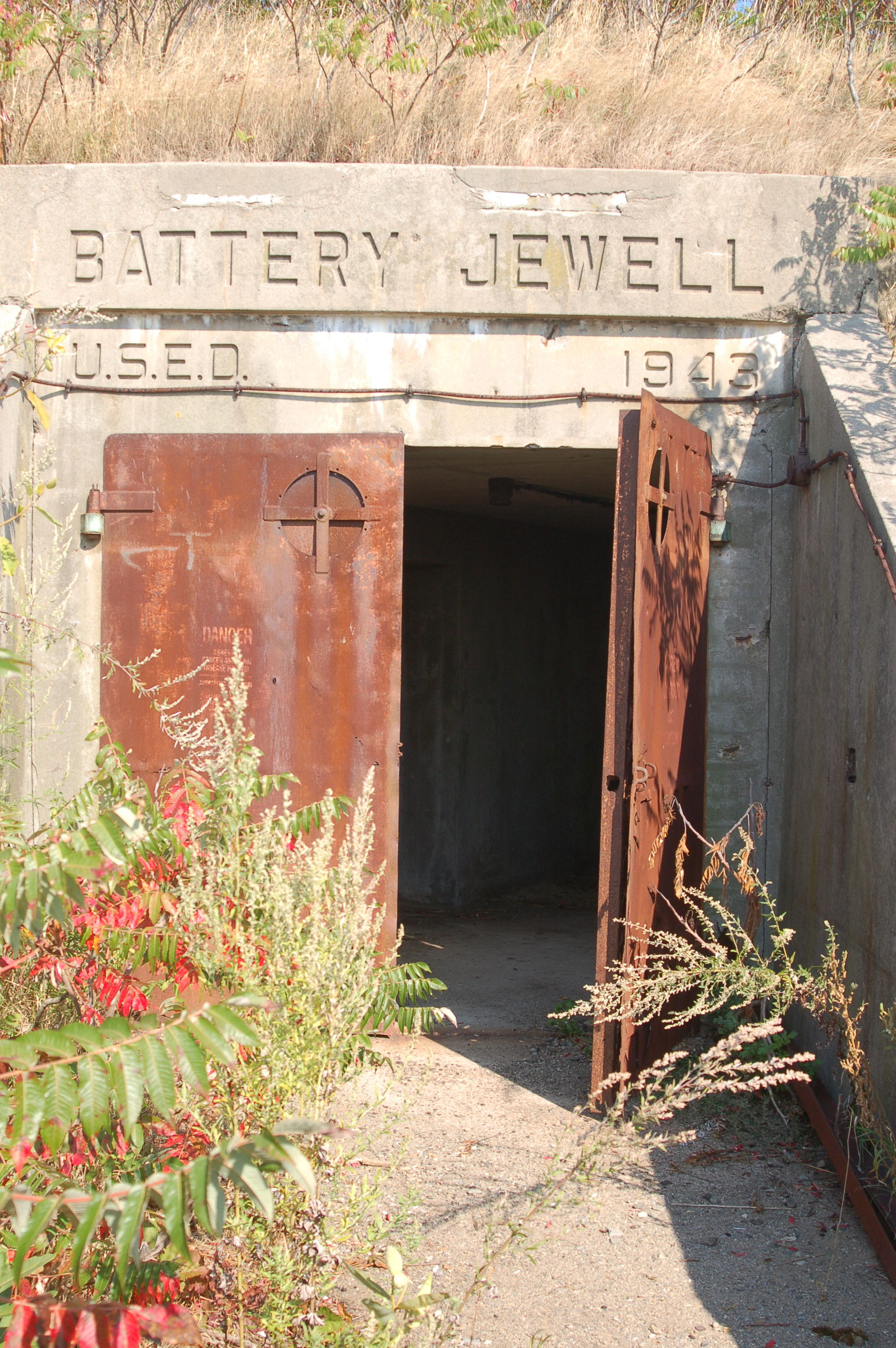
Battery Jewell constructed during WW II.

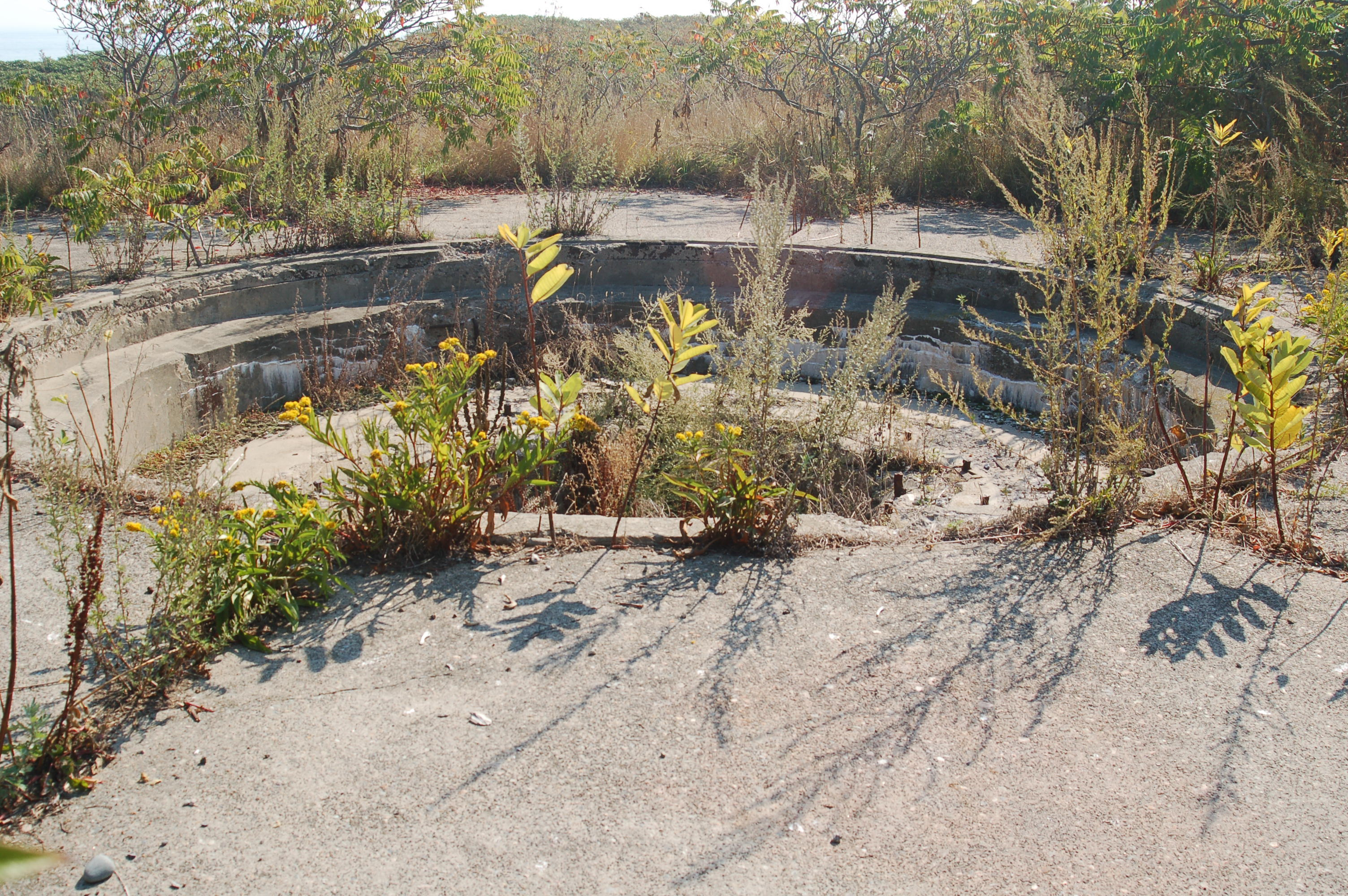
Battery Jewell's #2 gun emplacement.

Like the neighboring islands of Great Brewster, Little Brewster and Middle Brewster, Outer Brewster Island is named after William Brewster, the first preacher and teacher for the Plymouth Colony. The relative barrenness and rocky shoreline of Outer Brewster has resulted in limited human usage. A granite quarry was operated on the island in the 19th century, and a coastal defense battery, known as Battery Jewell, was built on the island during World War II. Both are now disused and abandoned.

In 1798 Nathaniel Austin bought Outer Brewster Island from David Wood for $400. Austin built an artificial harbor on the island and hoped to establish a profitable quarry. He built the house at 27 Harvard Square and 92 Main Street in Charlestown from stone mined on Outer Brewster.

The island was acquired by the US government from a private owner in 1913. Its primary use was in World War II as part of the Brewster Islands Military Reservation for a long-range 6-inch gun battery, named Battery Jewell and completed in 1943 along with a radar station. The island was abandoned by the Army in 1947 and subsequently sold to a private owner, becoming a state park in 1973.

In 2005, Virginia energy company AES Energy proposed placing a liquified natural gas terminal on the island. Political opposition from environmental, recreational and boating interests succeeded in preventing the proposal from moving forward.

== See also ==
- Green Island (Massachusetts)
- Long Island
- Brewster, Massachusetts
