= Clement Drew =

American painter

Clement Drew (1806–1889) was an artist and "dealer in picture-frames" in Boston, Massachusetts, in the 19th century. He specialized in marine paintings. He kept a studio on Court Street (ca.1840s-1860s), Tremont Street (in the Boston Museum building, ca.1873), Copeland Street (ca.1888), and Tremont Temple (1889). He married Elizabeth Teal in 1829; they had two children.

Among the subjects painted by Drew: "Abaellino privateer, 1812"; Bark Vernon on Lynn Beach, Morning, Feby. 3rd, 1859; Brig Vintage (built 1837); missionary packet Morning Star Minot's Light; "the ship Abolition and the wreck Colonization, 1839;" sailing ship Uriel; yacht passing Thatcher Island Lights, Cape Ann; Ship Mary L. Sutton; Ship Hound; and wreck of the Schooner Hesperus on Norman's Woe, Gloucester, Massachusetts, 1883.

== Images ==
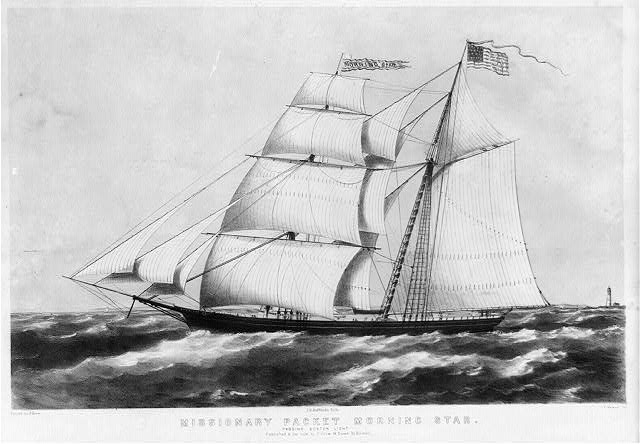
Missionary packet Morning Star passing Boston Light; painted by C.Drew, print by J.H. Bufford’s Lith.

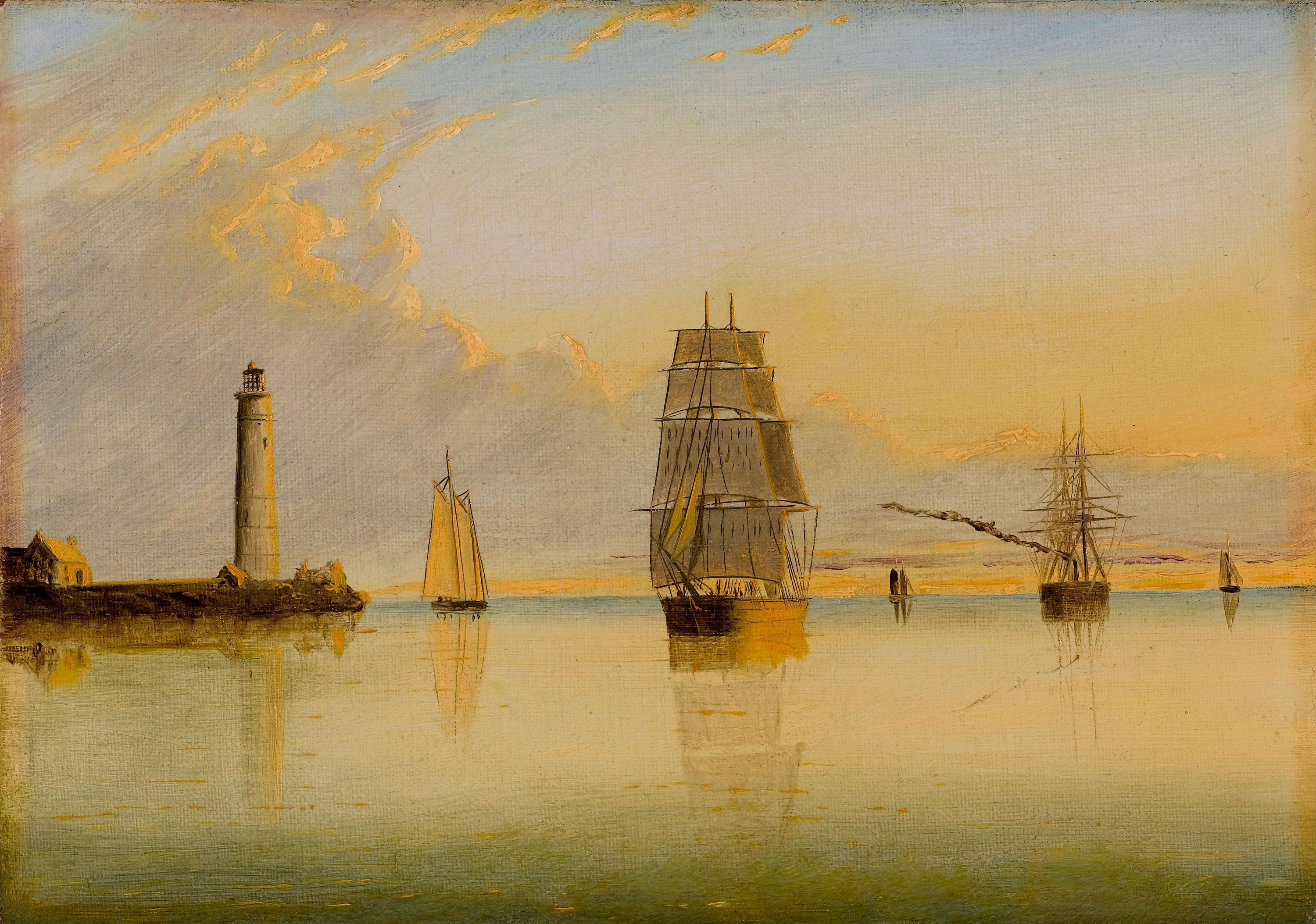
Morning Off Boston Light, 1879

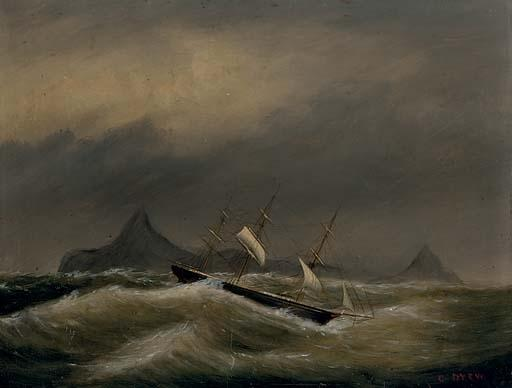
Cape Horn, 1884

Eastward voyage of the new Cunarder Acadia, ca 1840-1860, in the collection at The Mariners' Museum
