= Boston Light =

Lighthouse in Massachusetts, United States

Boston Light Boston Light
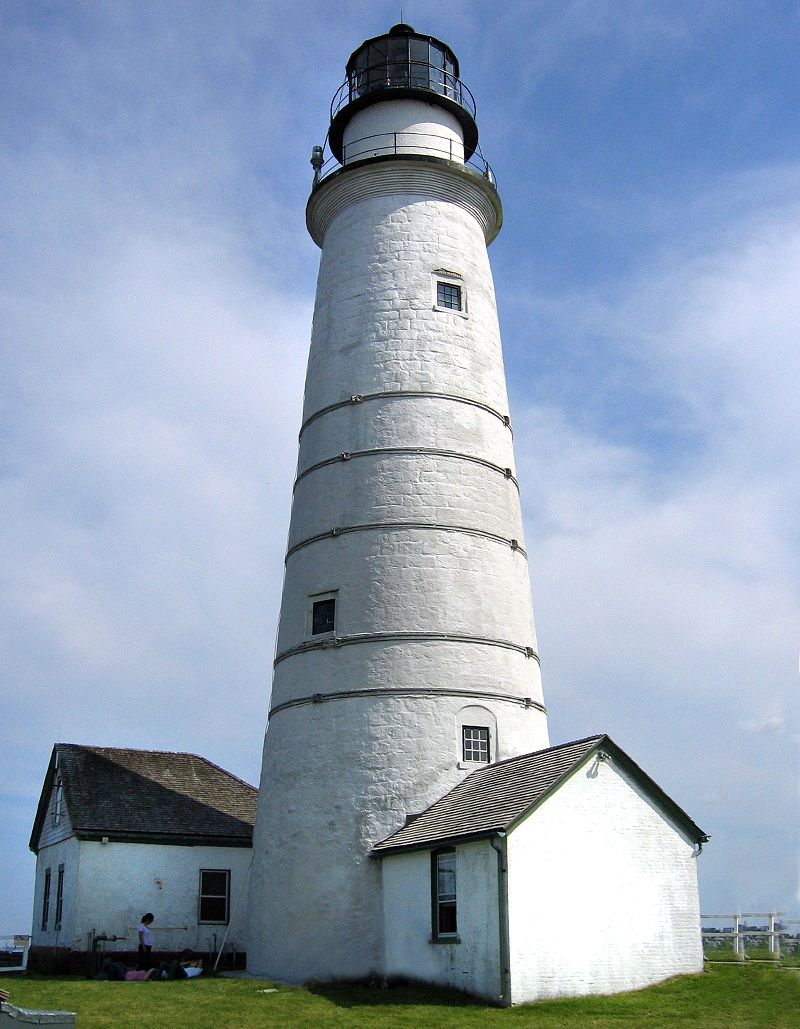
- Location: Little Brewster Island Boston, Massachusetts
- Coordinates: 42°19′41″N 70°53′24″W

Tower
- Constructed: 1716
- Foundation: Granite Ledge
- Construction: Masonry, Rubble Stone with brick lining
- Automated: 1998
- Height: 89 feet (27 m)
- Shape: Conical
- Markings: White with five steel bands and black trim
- Heritage: National Historic Landmark, National Register of Historic Places listed place
- Fog signal: HORN: 1 every 30s

Light
- First lit: 1783 (current tower)
- Deactivated: 1776–1783 and during the Revolutionary War.
- Focal height: 102 feet (31 m)
- Lens: Tallow candles (1716), 2nd order Fresnel lens (current)
- Intensity: 1,800,000 candlepower
- Range: 27 nautical miles (50 km; 31 mi)
- Characteristic: Flashing white every 10 seconds.
- Boston Light
- U.S. National Register of Historic Places
- U.S. National Historic Landmark
- Area: 3.5 acres (1.4 ha)
- MPS: Lighthouses of Massachusetts TR (AD)
- NRHP reference No.: 66000133
- Added to NRHP: October 15, 1966

Boston Light is a lighthouse located on Little Brewster Island in outer Boston Harbor, Massachusetts. The first lighthouse to be built on the site dates back to 1716, and was the first lighthouse to be built in what is now the United States. During the American Revolution, the original lighthouse was held by British forces and was attacked and burnt on two occasions by American forces. As the British forces withdrew in 1776, they blew up the tower and completely destroyed it.

The lighthouse was eventually reconstructed in 1783, to the same 75-foot (23 m) height as the original tower. In 1856 it was raised to its present height of 98 feet (30 m) and a new lantern room was added along with a 12-sided second order Fresnel lens. It is the second oldest working lighthouse in the United States (after Sandy Hook Lighthouse in New Jersey) and is the only lighthouse to still be actively staffed by the United States Coast Guard despite its automation in 1998. The structure was designated a National Historic Landmark in 1964.

== History ==
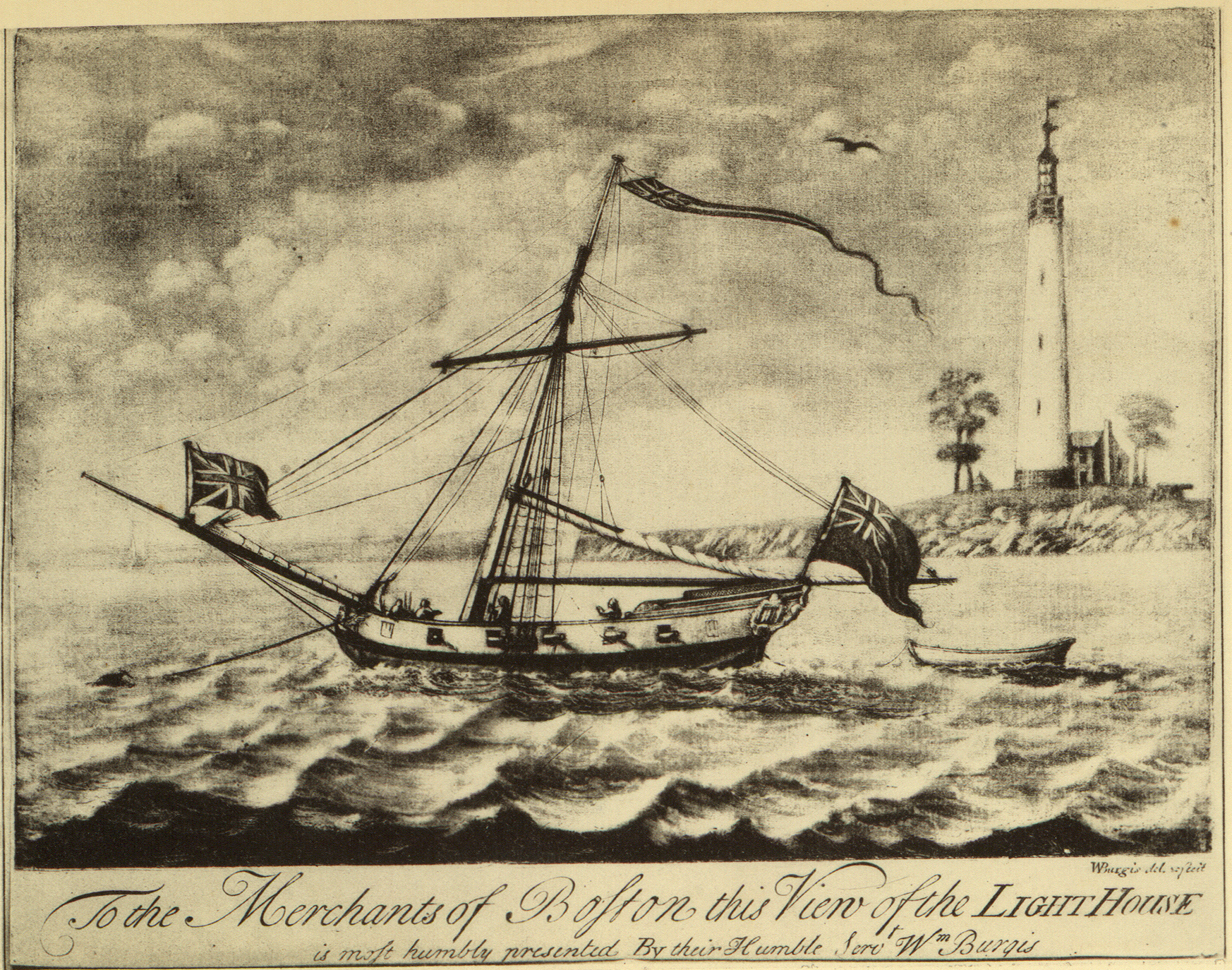
1729 illustration showing signal cannon in right background

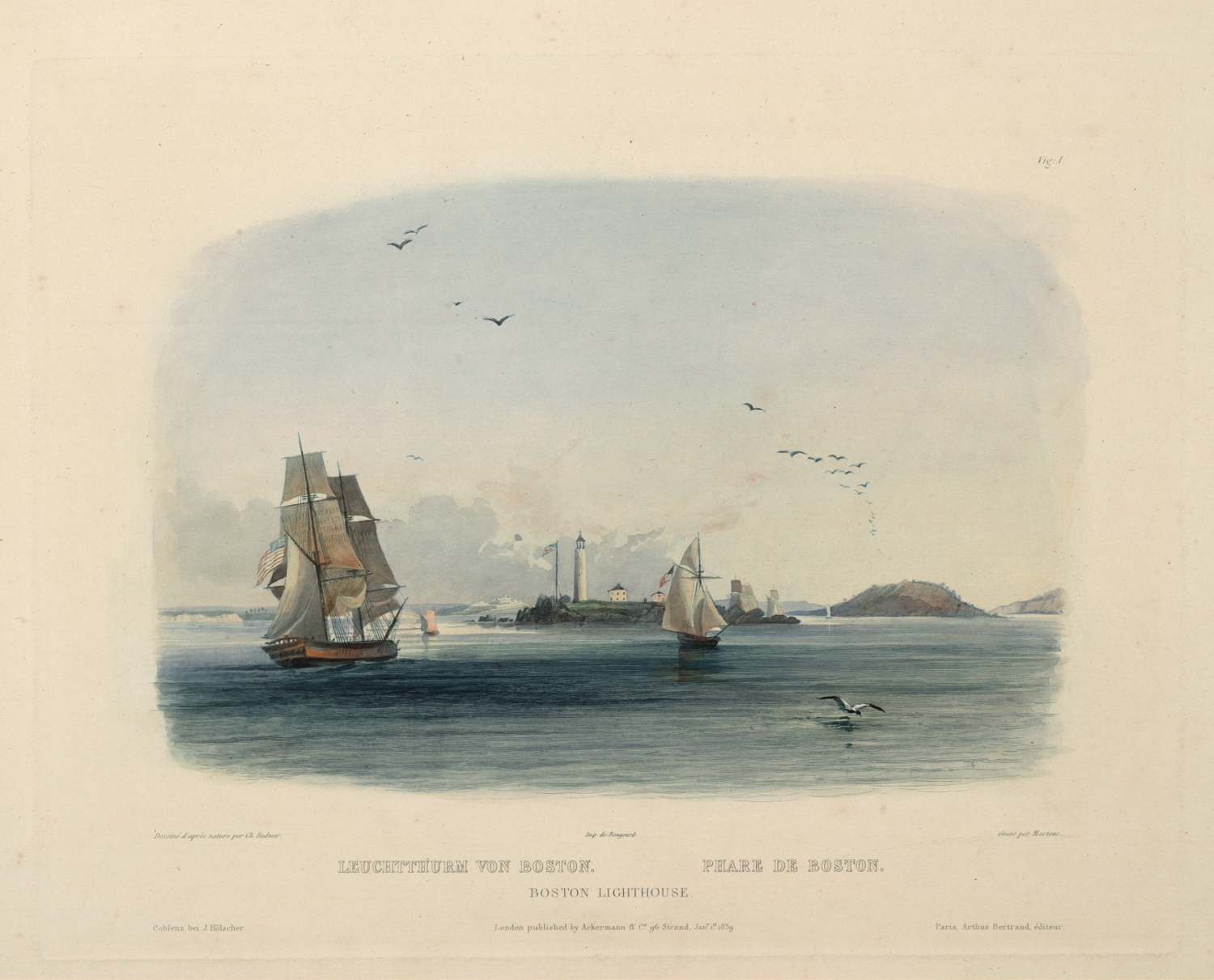
Boston Lighthouse (Leuchtthurm von Boston; Phare de Boston) by Karl Bodmer, 1839

The first lighthouse established in America was on Little Brewster Island in Boston Harbor and was first lit September 14, 1716. A tonnage tax of 1 penny per ton on all vessels, except coasters, moving in or out of Boston Harbor, paid for maintaining the light.

The first keeper, George Worthylake, with a salary of £50 a year, also acted as pilot for vessels entering the harbor. In 1718 he and his wife and daughter, with two men, were drowned when the lighthouse boat capsized as they were returning to the island from Boston. Young Benjamin Franklin, then a printer in Boston, wrote a ballad about the incident entitled "Lighthouse Tragedy" and sold it on the streets of Boston.

The pay of Keeper John Hayes was raised to £70 in 1718 so that he would not be obliged to entertain mariners on the island for extra money which he found " prejudicial to himself as well as to the town of Boston" In 1719 he asked " That a great Gun may be placed on Said Island to answer Ships in a Fogg" and one was supplied that year on which the date 1700 was engraved. The gun is shown on a mezzotint engraving of Boston Light made by Burgess in 1729.

Hayes’ successor in 1734 was Robert Ball who petitioned the general court for preference in piloting vessels into the harbor. The court designated him as an "established pilot" of the harbor for the next three years. In 1751 the lighthouse was badly damaged by fire so that only the walls remained.

In 1774 the British took over the island and in 1775 the harbor was blocked and the lighthouse became useless. On July 20, 1775, a small detachment of American troops under Major Voss visited the island and burned the wooden parts of the lighthouse. The British began to repair it under a marine guard when General Washington dispatched Major Benjamin Tupper with 300 men in whaleboats on July 31, 1775, who defeated the guard and destroyed the repair work done. They were intercepted on leaving by British small boats and attacked. A direct hit on one of the British boats by an American field piece on Nantasket Head caused the British to retire to their boats with comparatively heavy losses. Only one American was killed. Major Tupper and his men were commended by General Washington.

When the British left Boston, March 17, 1776, a number of their ships remained in the harbor. On June 13, 1776, American soldiers landed on Long Island, Boston Harbor, and at Nantasket Hill and opened fire on this fleet. Before sailing away, the British sent a boat ashore at Boston Light and left a time charge which blew up the lighthouse.

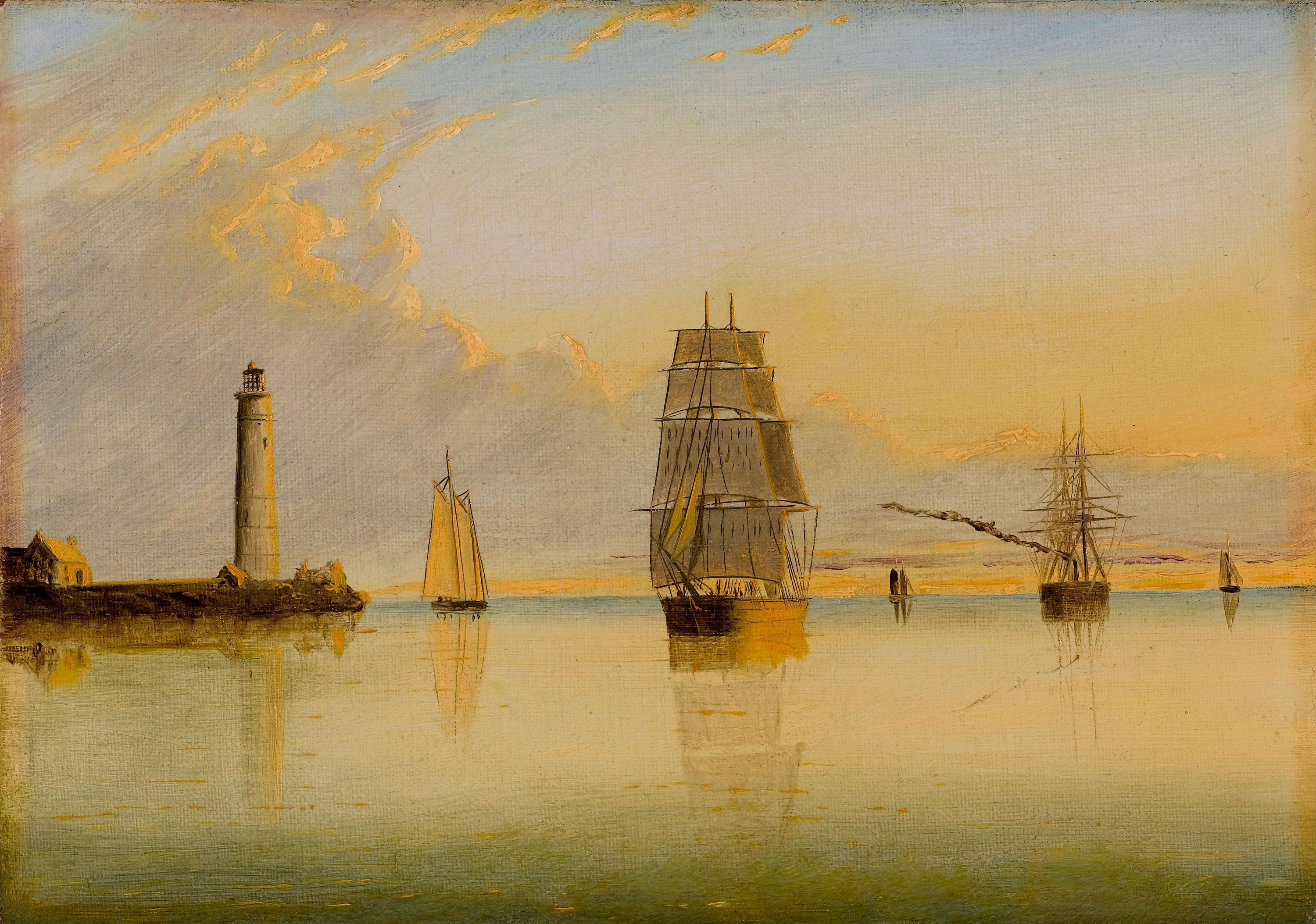
Morning Off Boston Light by Clement Drew, 1879

In 1783 the Massachusetts Legislature supplied £1,450 to erect a new lighthouse on the site of the old. This new lighthouse was 75 feet (23 m) high with walls 7 feet 6 inches (2.29 m) thick at the base, tapering to 2 feet 6 inches (0.76 m) at the top. The octagonal lantern was 15 feet (4.6 m) high and 8 feet (2.4 m) in diameter. Thomas Knox was appointed keeper.

On June 10, 1790, the Boston Light was ceded to the new Federal Government.

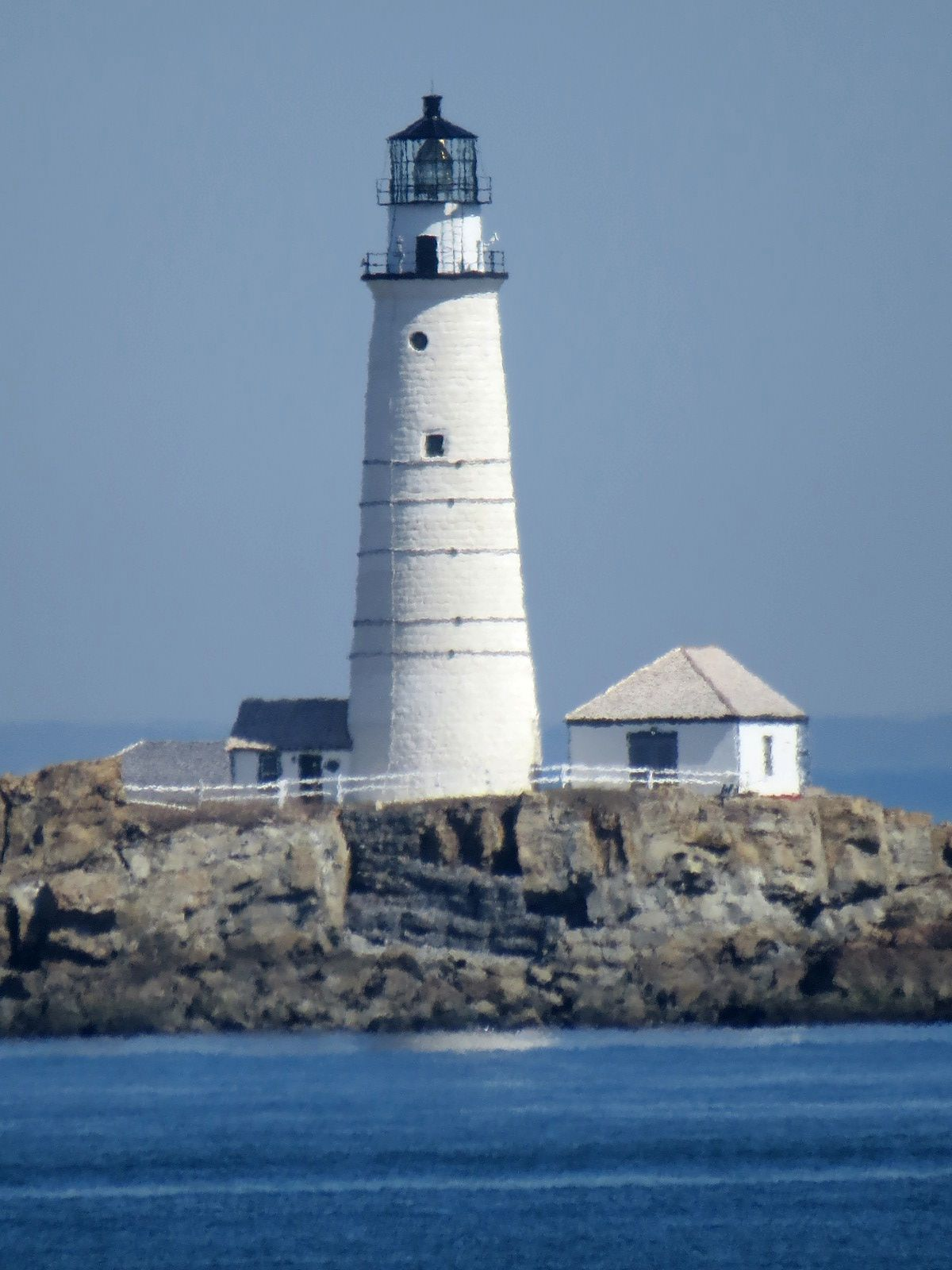
As seen from Hull Life Saving Museum

In 1856, the height of the tower was raised to 98 feet (30 m) and it was listed as a second-order station.

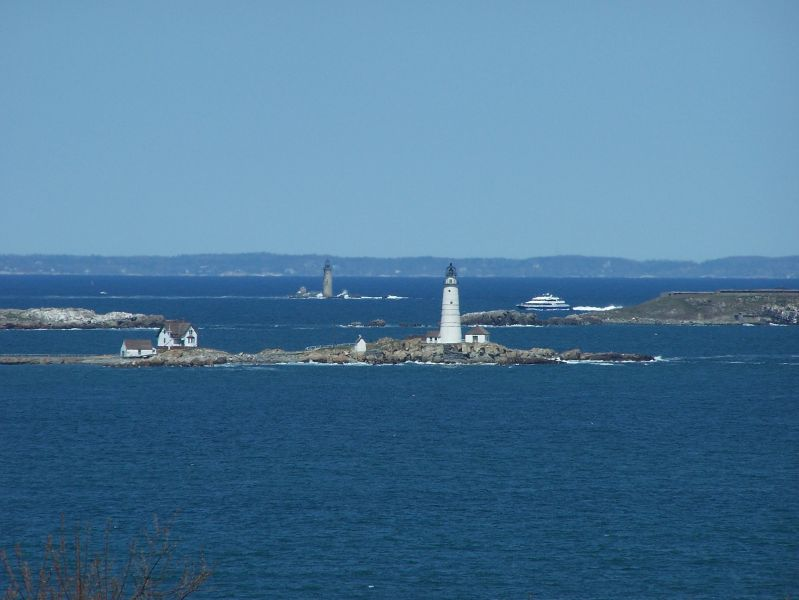
Boston Light with The Graves Light behind and a Provincetown ferry between them on the right.

In 1893 the Massachusetts Institute of Technology sent 20 or 30 students to live on the island, while experiments were made with various types of foghorns in an endeavor to find one that would penetrate the area known as the "Ghost Walk" 6 or 7 miles (11 km) to the east.

When the USS Alacrity (SP-206) was wrecked on the ice-covered ledges off the island on February 3, 1918, Keeper Jennings and his assistants made four attempts to shoot a rope to the doomed ship but each time the rope parted. Jennings brought the lighthouse dory to the shore, and, assisted by two naval reservists, pushed it over the ice and into the surf. Twenty-four men were clinging to the wreck in perilous positions when he reached it after a dangerous trip. Flinging a line aboard, they began the rescue of the half-frozen sailors, four times running the gauntlet of ice, rocks, and surf until all 24 men were saved. For this Jennings received a letter of commendation from Secretary Redfield.

During World War II the light was extinguished as a security measure but was again placed in operation on July 2, 1945. The station is equipped with a 1,800,000 candlepower light visible for 27 nautical miles (50 km).

== Today ==
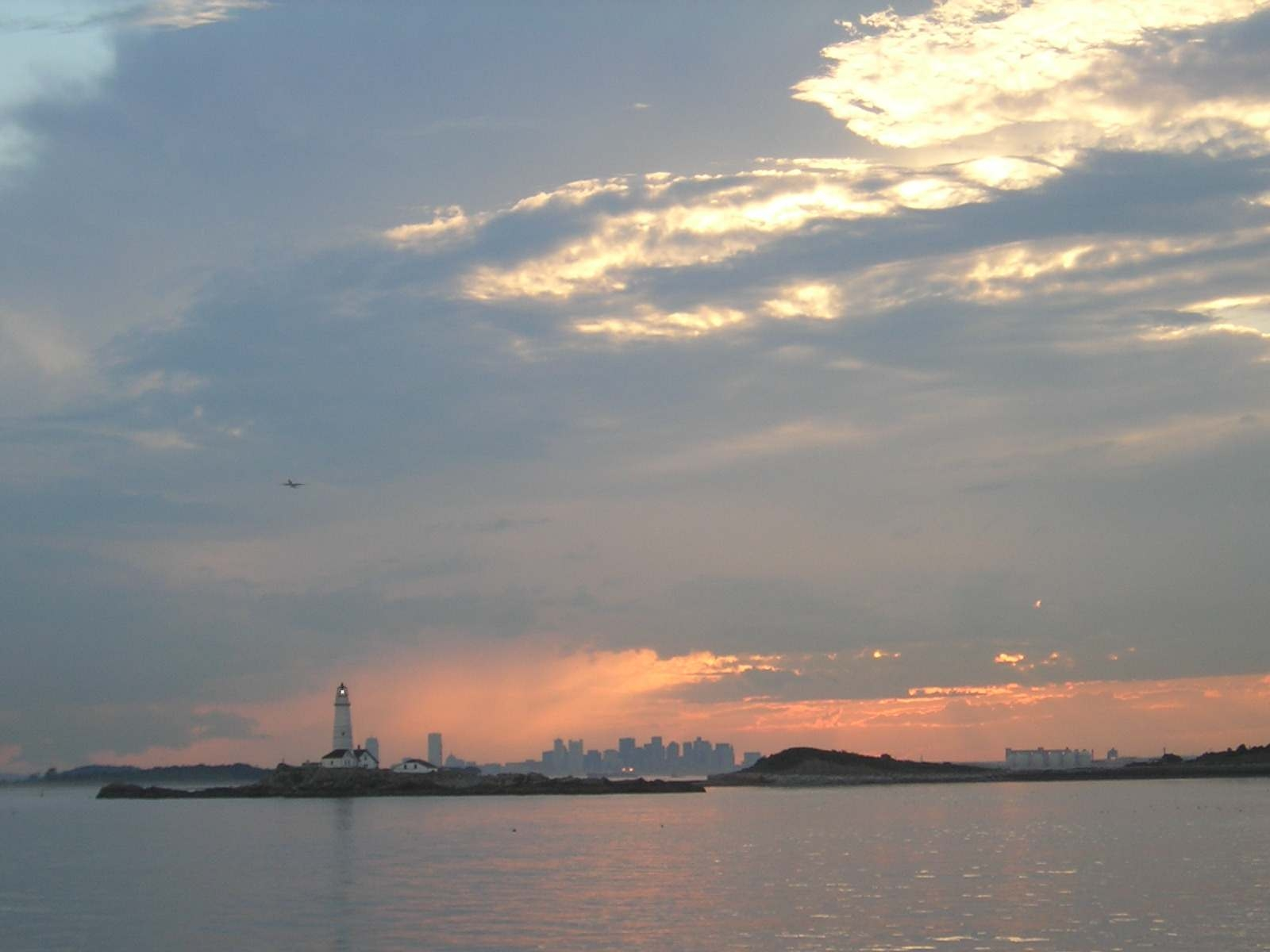
2007

Boston Light was automated in 1998, but was staffed by resident Coast Guard keeper, Sally Snowman until December 30, 2023. She has been assisted by Auxiliarist watchstanders from the Coast Guard Auxiliary. These personnel perform maintenance and act as interpretive tour guides.

Its light, flashing white every 10 seconds, shines through the only second-order Fresnel lens still in use in Massachusetts (of only four total), and is visible from a distance of 27 nautical miles (50 km; 31 mi). Although it is still an important navigation mark, its importance has been decreased over the last century by the use of Boston Harbor's North Channel for most large vessels entering the harbor, which is marked by Graves Light.

Guided tours of the island and lighthouse are available. They are also available through the National Park Service.

The lighthouse underwent major renovations in 2014 and was covered with scaffolding. It reopened to visitors in 2015.

== See also ==
- List of National Historic Landmarks in Boston
- National Register of Historic Places listings in southern Boston, Massachusetts

== cExternal links ==
- Boston Light - United States Lighthouses
- Little Brewster Island web page, with visitor information.
