= Great Brewster Island =

Island in Suffolk County, Massachusetts, United States

Coordinates: 42°19′55″N 70°53′47″W

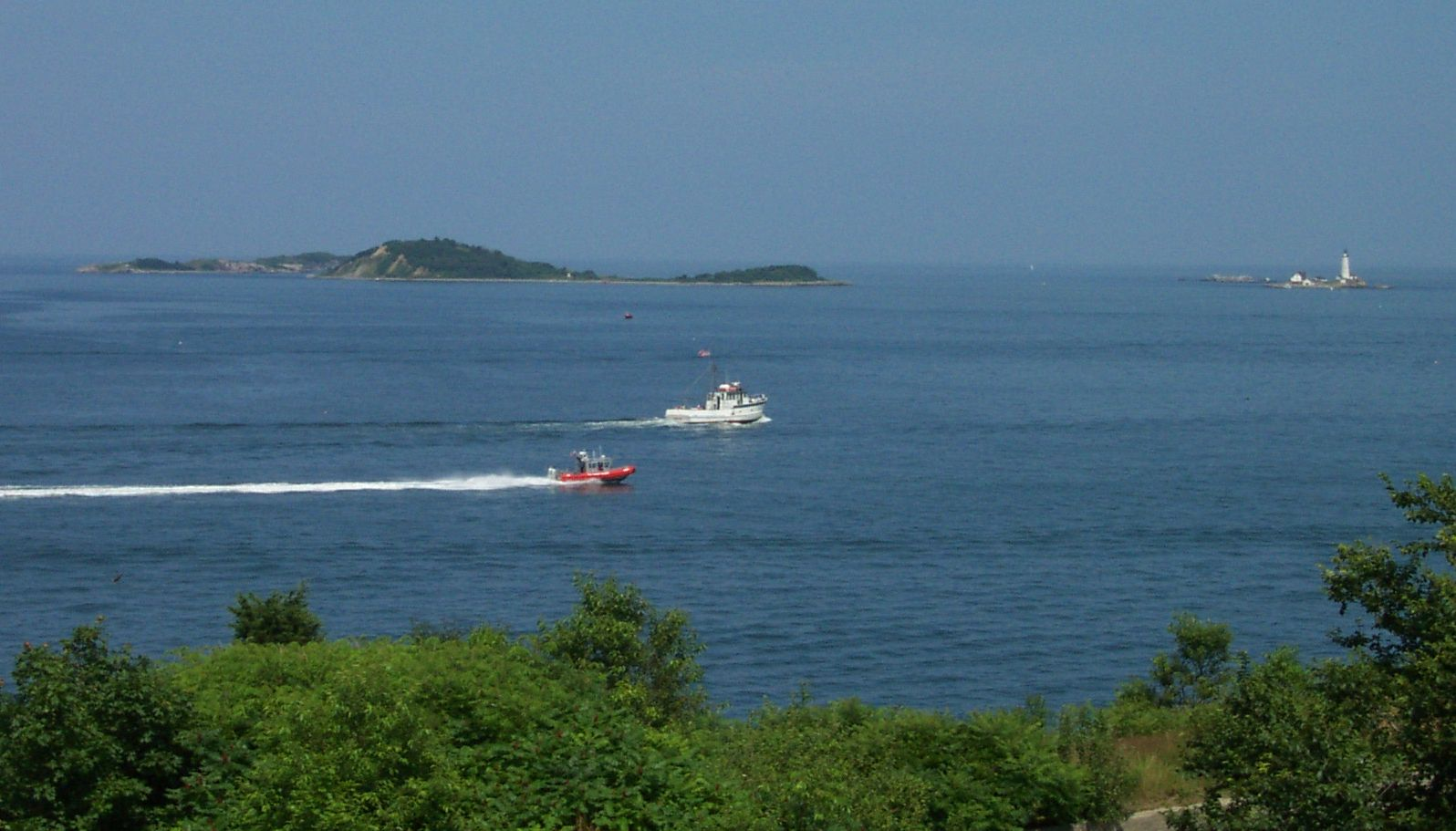
Great Brewster Island (left), Middle Brewster Island (left rear) and Little Brewster Island (right, with lighthouse) in Boston Harbor as viewed from Fort Warren on Georges Island.

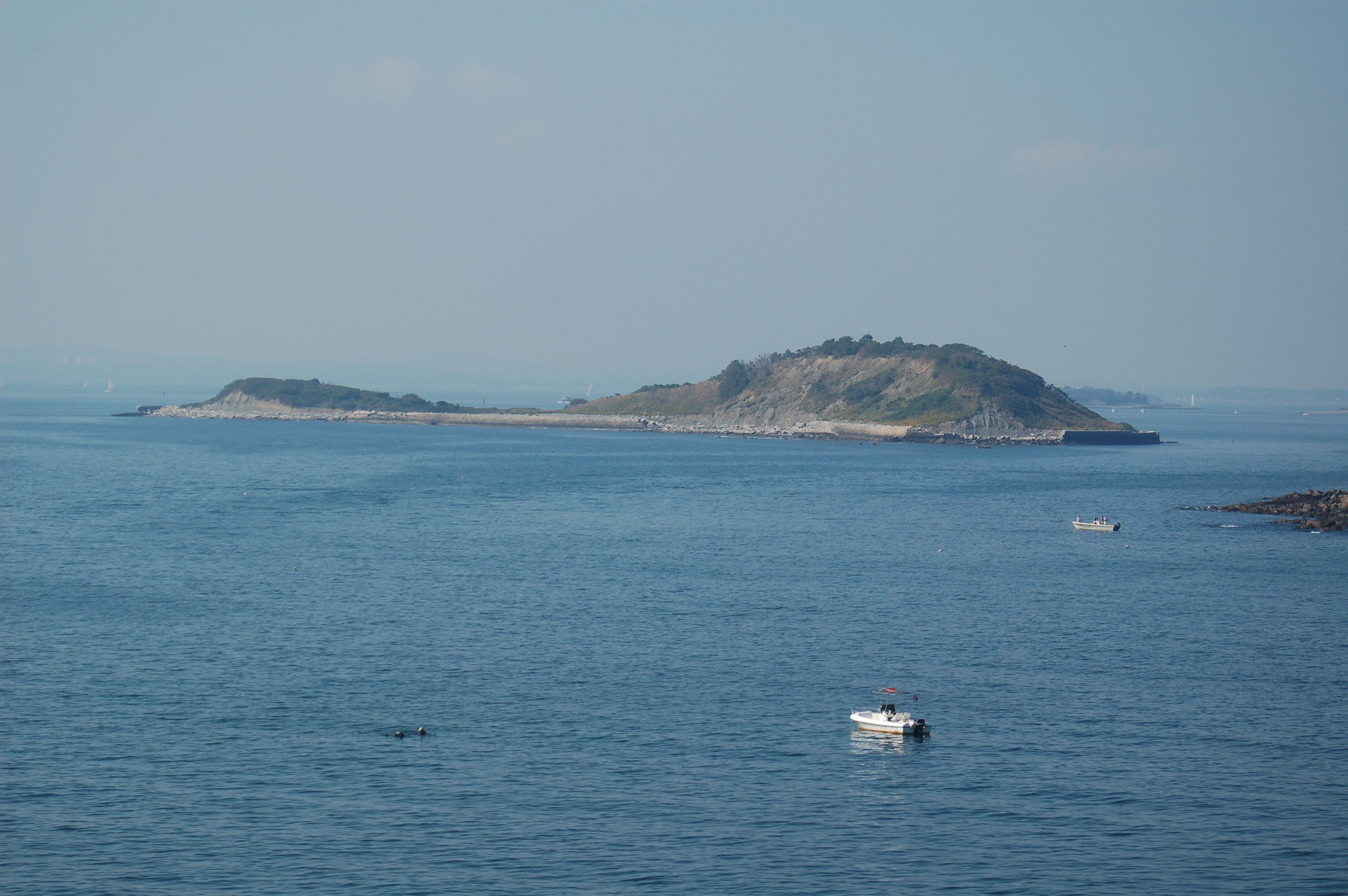
Great Brewster Island viewed from Outer Brewster Island.

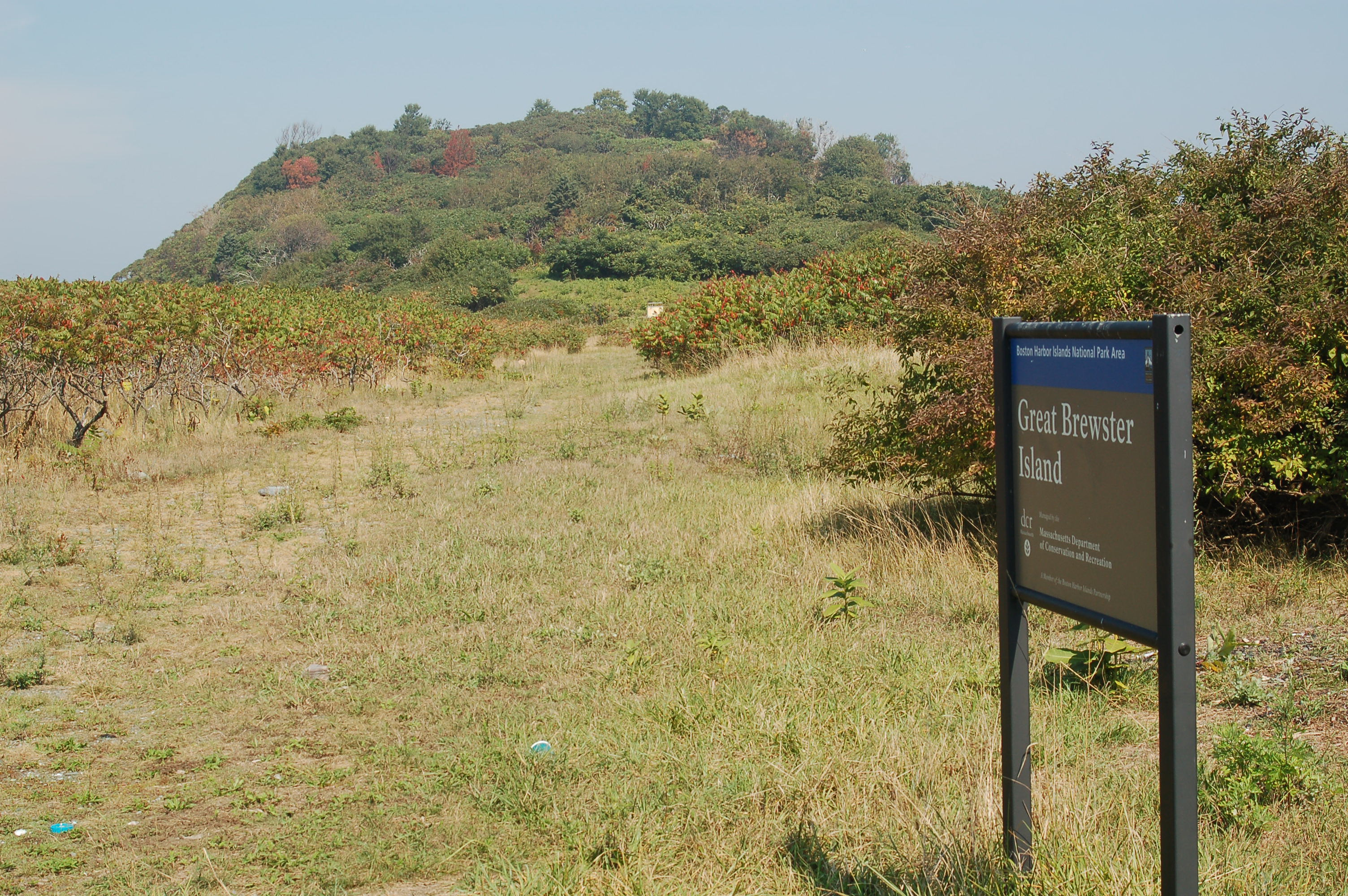
Looking north on Great Brewster Island.

Great Brewster Island is one of the outer islands in the Boston Harbor Islands National Recreation Area, situated some 9 miles (14 km) offshore of downtown Boston. The island has a permanent size of 18 acres (73,000 m^{2}), plus an intertidal zone of a further 49 acres (200,000 m^{2}). Unlike the other outer islands, which are low-lying outcroppings of bedrock, Great Brewster is a drumlin which reaches a height of over 100 feet (30 m) above sea level. It has vegetation cover consisting of Eastern white pine, Asparagus, Apple Trees, Pear Trees, Sumac, Beach Roses, Grasses and Common Reeds, together with a large Gull colony. The birds are aggressive during nesting season and access by humans, which is by private boat only, is discouraged during that time.

Like the neighbouring islands of Little Brewster, Middle Brewster and Outer Brewster, Great Brewster Island is named after William Brewster, the first preacher and teacher for the Plymouth Colony. In 1891, in what was considered a radical action for the time, four women spent two weeks on the island and documented their visit. More recently, the island has been home to summer cottages for local families and for soldiers who staffed an observation post as part of the Brewster Islands Military Reservation during World War II. The military post included 90 mm rapid-fire guns, searchlight stations, and a command post that aided in controlling the harbor's minefield.

== See also ==
- Green Island (Massachusetts)
- Long Island
