= Little Brewster Island =

Island in Suffolk County, Massachusetts, United States

Coordinates: 42°19′40.68″N 70°53′26.12″W

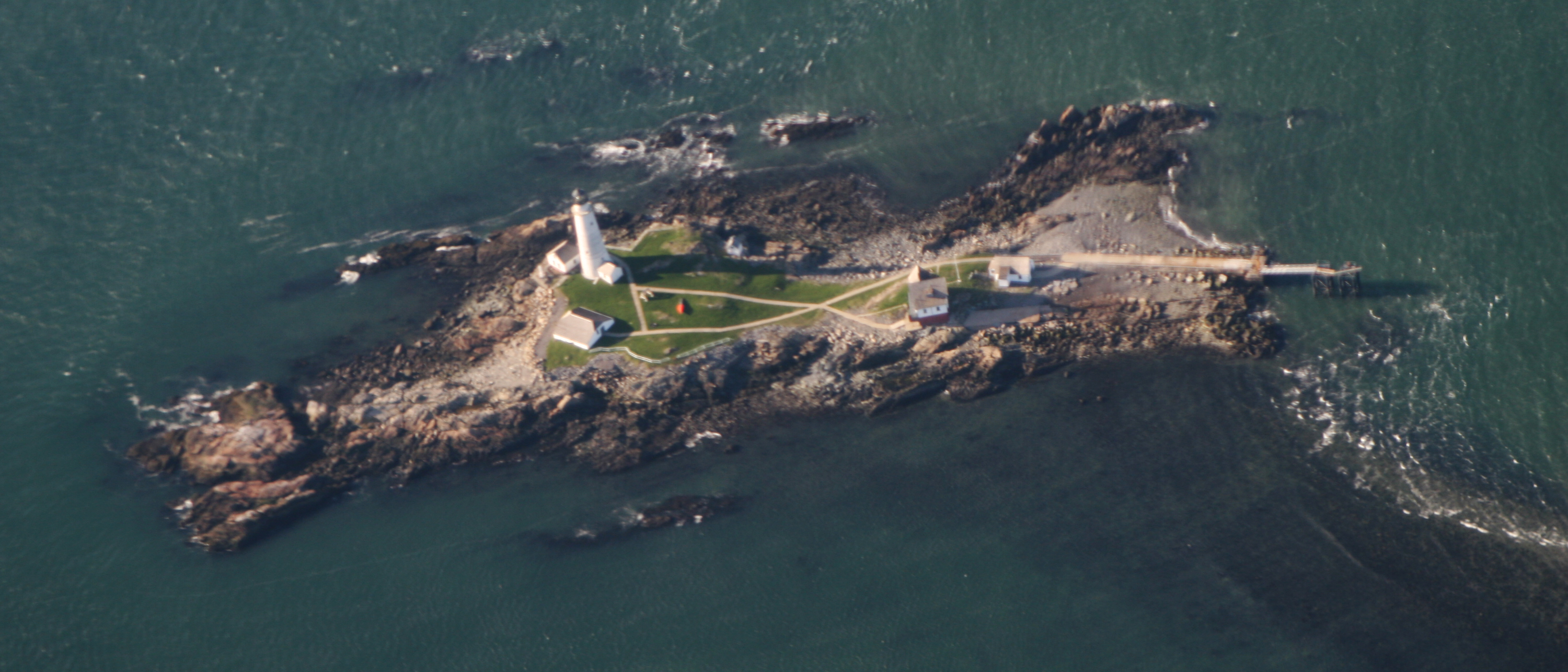
Aerial view of Little Brewster Island and Boston Light, 2010

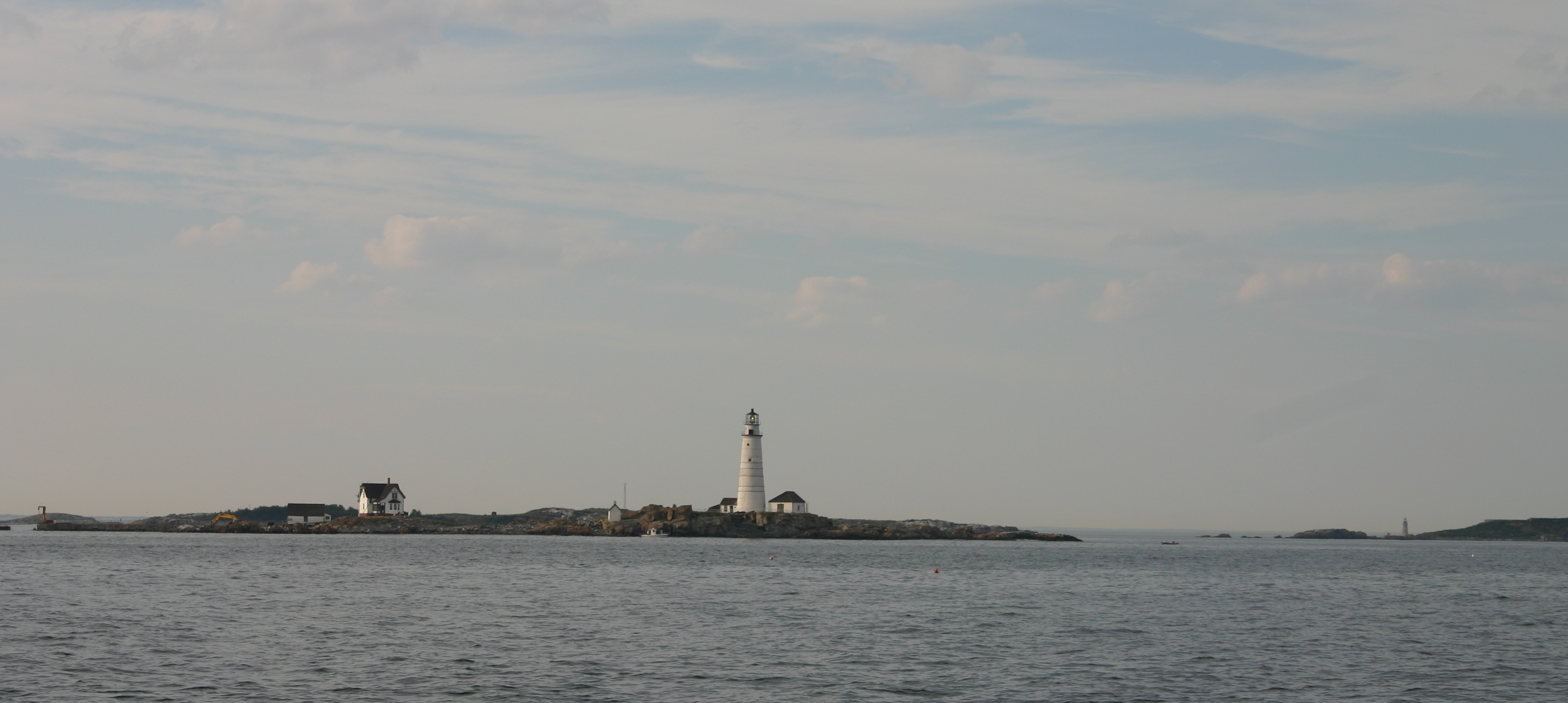
Little Brewster Island with Boston Light

Little Brewster Island is a rocky outer island in the Boston Harbor Islands National Recreation Area. It is best known as the location of Boston Light, one of only five remaining Coast Guard-staffed lighthouses in the United States, and an important navigation aid for traffic to and from the Port of Boston. The island is situated some 9 miles (14 km) offshore of downtown Boston and has a permanent size of 3 acres (12,000 m^{2}), plus an intertidal zone of a further 4 acres (16,000 m^{2}).

Like the neighboring islands of Great Brewster, Middle Brewster and Outer Brewster, Little Brewster Island is named after William Brewster, the first preacher and teacher for the Plymouth Colony. Because it is still the site of an active Coast Guard facility, opportunities to visit the island are restricted, although guided tours of the island and lighthouse are available.

== See also ==
- Green Island (Massachusetts)
- Long Island
- Sally Snowman – last keeper of Boston Light
