= Maurice Parker =

Maurice Parker may refer to:

- Maurice W. Parker Sr. (1873–1958), voice coach, marksman, billiard champion, and violin maker
- Maurice W. Parker, Jr. (1908–1985), president of Parker Manufacturing Co.
- Wes Parker (Maurice W. Parker III) (1939- ), first baseman for the Los Angeles Dodgers
- Maurice S. Parker, U.S. diplomat
- Morris Parker, United States national amateur boxing bantamweight champions
