= Sarah Island =

Sarah Island may refer to:

- Sarah Island (Massachusetts), an island in the U.S. state of Massachusetts
- Sarah Island (Tasmania), the remnant site of the Macquarie Harbour Penal Station in Van Diemen's Land (now Tasmania) in Australia
- Sarah Island (British Columbia), an island east of Princess Royal Island
