= Hingham, Massachusetts =

Town in Massachusetts, United States

- Town
- Downtown Hingham in 2026

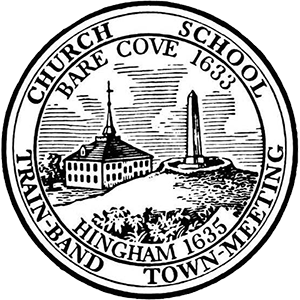
- Seal
- Nickname: "Bucket Town"
- Motto(s): "History and Pride"
- Location in Plymouth County in Massachusetts
- Coordinates: 42°14′N 70°53′W
- Country: United States
- State: Massachusetts
- County: Plymouth
- Settled: 1633 (as Bare Cove)
- Incorporated: September 2, 1635

Government
  - Type: Open town meeting

Area
  - Total: 26.3 sq mi (68.1 km^{2})
  - Land: 22.2 sq mi (57.5 km^{2})
  - Water: 4.1 sq mi (10.6 km^{2})
- Elevation: 59 ft (18 m)

Population (2020)
  - Total: 24,284
  - Density: 1,090/sq mi (422/km^{2})
- Demonym: Hinghamite
- Time zone: UTC-5 (Eastern)
  - Summer (DST): UTC-4 (Eastern)
- ZIP Code: 02043
- Area code: 339/781
- FIPS code: 25-30210
- GNIS feature ID: 0618342
- Website: Hingham, Massachusetts

Hingham (/ˈhɪŋəm/ HING-əm) is a town in northern Plymouth County in the U.S. state of Massachusetts. Part of the Greater Boston region, it is located on the South Shore of Massachusetts. At the 2020 census, the population was 24,284. It contains the census-designated place of the same name. Hingham is known for its colonial history and location on Boston Harbor. The town was named after Hingham, Norfolk, England, and was first settled by English colonists in 1633.

== History ==
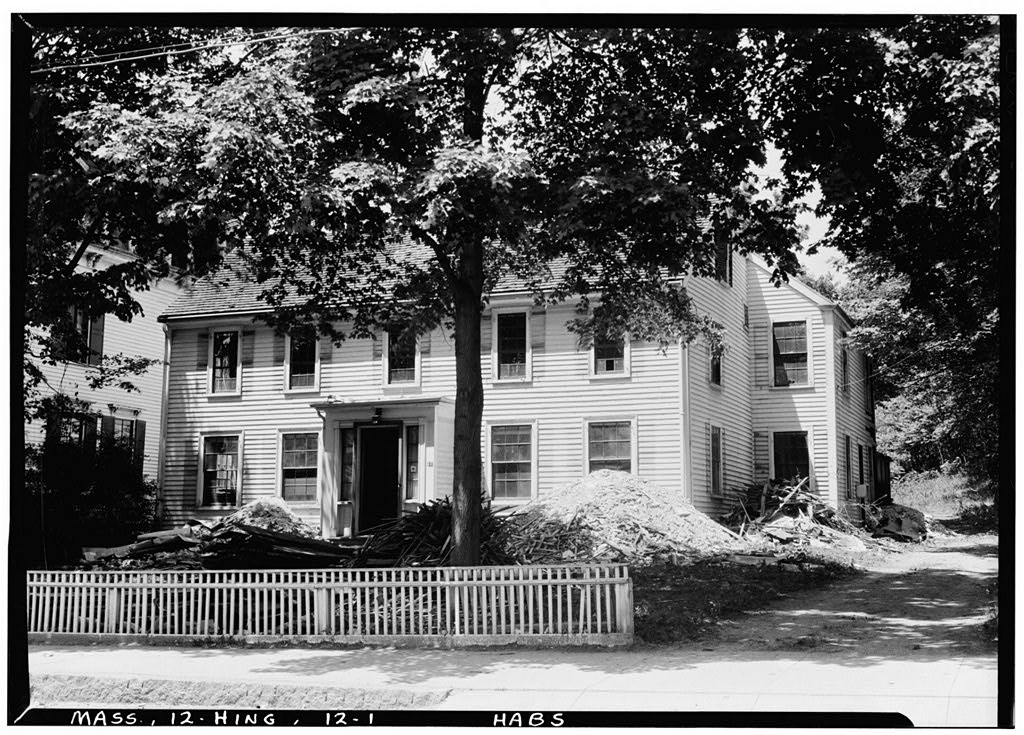
Perez Lincoln House, c. 1640, North Street, Hingham

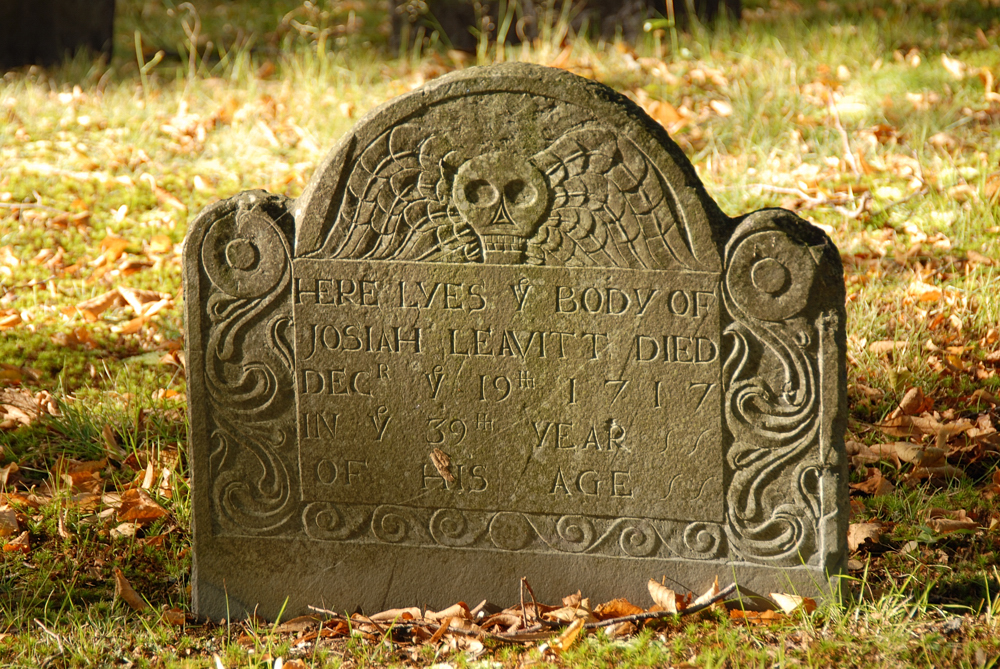
Grave of colonist Josiah Leavitt, Old Ship Burying Ground, Hingham

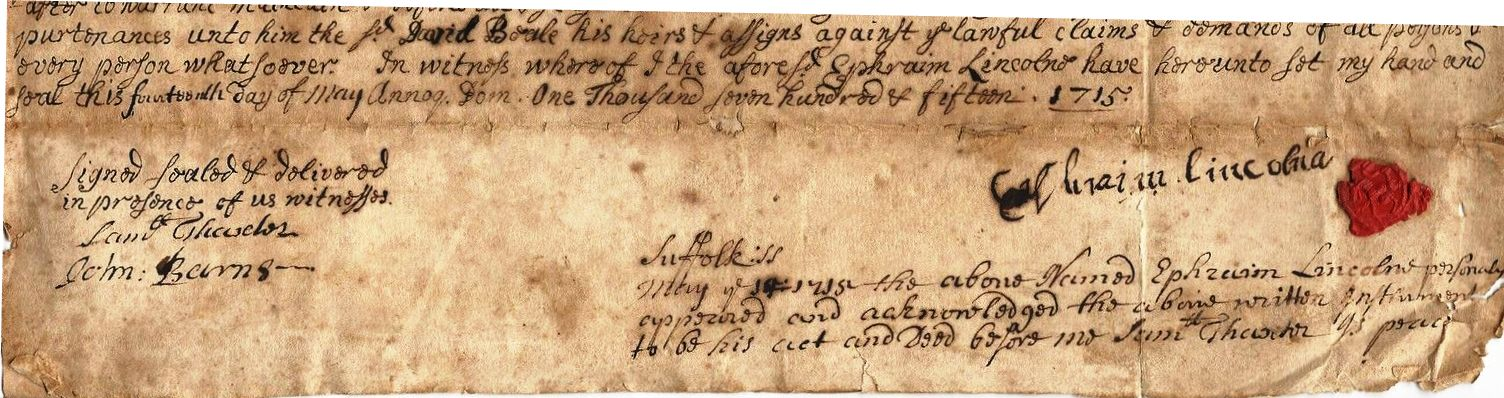
A deed signed by Col. Samuel Thaxter of Hingham

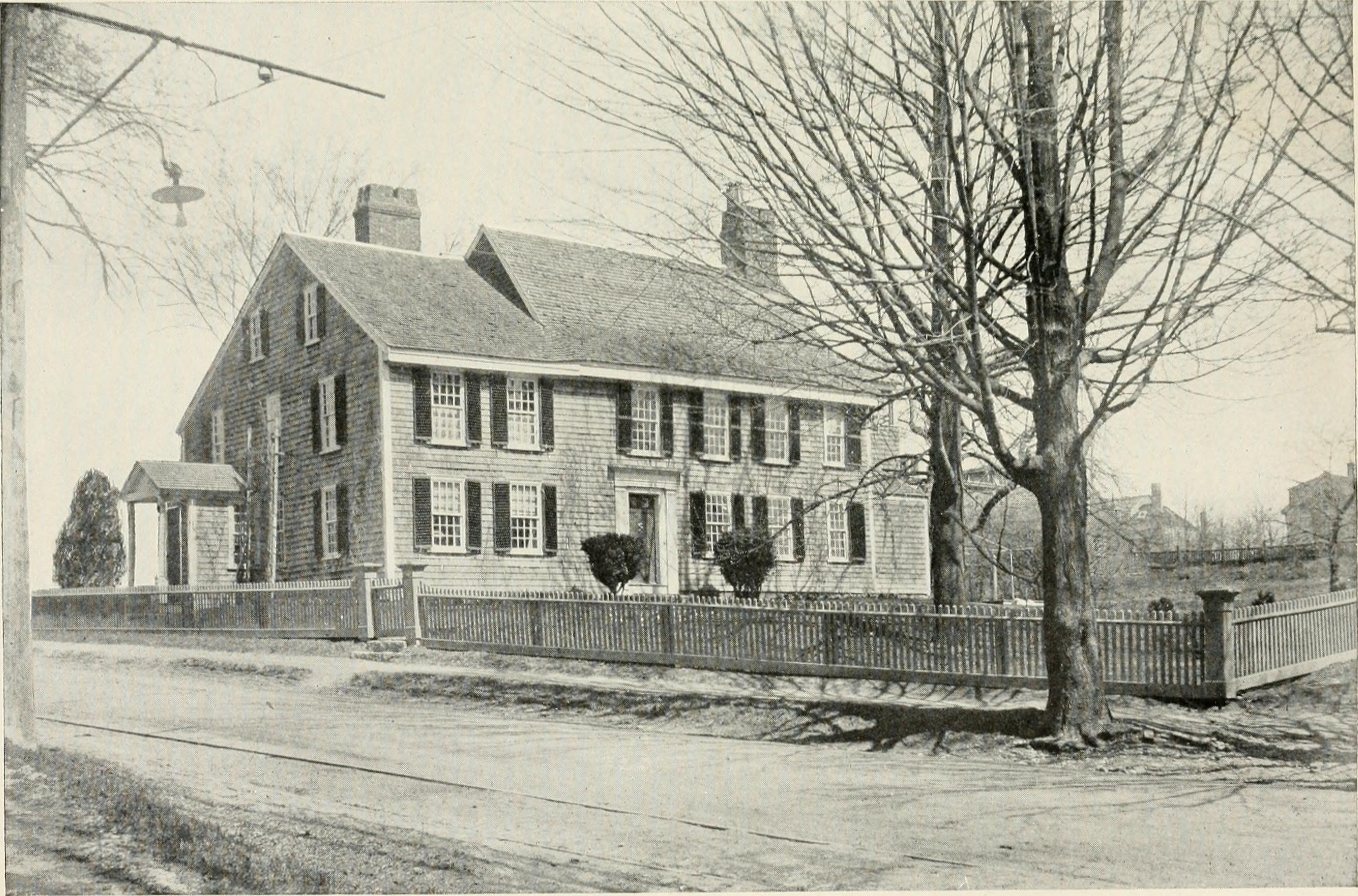
The Old Ordinary is an early Hingham tavern that was donated to the Hingham Historical Society by Hingham philanthropist Wilmon Brewer.

The town of Hingham was dubbed "Bare Cove" by the first colonizing English in 1633, but two years later was incorporated as a town under the name "Hingham." The land on which Hingham was settled was deeded to the English by the Wampanoag sachem Wompatuck in 1655. The town was within Suffolk County from its founding in 1643 until 1803, and Plymouth County from 1803 to the present. The eastern part of the town split off to become Cohasset in 1770. The town was named for Hingham, a market town in the English county of Norfolk, whence most of the first colonists came, including Abraham Lincoln's ancestor Samuel Lincoln (1622–1690), his first American ancestor, who came to Massachusetts in 1637. A statue of President Lincoln adorns the area adjacent to downtown Hingham Square.

Hingham was born of religious dissent. Many of the original founders were forced to flee their native town in Norfolk with both their vicars, Rev. Peter Hobart and Rev. Robert Peck, when they fell afoul of the strict doctrines of the Church of England. Peck was known for what the eminent Norfolk historian Rev. Francis Blomefield called his "violent schismatical spirit". Peck lowered the chancel railing of the church, in accord with Puritan sentiment that the Anglican church of the day was too removed from its parishioners. He also antagonized ecclesiastical authorities with other forbidden practices.

Hobart, born in Hingham, Norfolk, in 1604 and, like Peck, a graduate of Magdalene College, Cambridge, sought shelter from the prevailing discipline of the high church among his fellow Puritans. The cost to those who emigrated was steep. They "sold their possessions for half their value," noted a contemporary account, "and named the place of their settlement after their natal town." (The cost to the place they left behind was also high: Hingham was forced to petition Parliament for aid, claiming that the departure of its most well-to-do citizens had left it hamstrung.)

While most of the early Hingham settlers came from Hingham and other nearby villages in East Anglia, a few Hingham settlers like Anthony Eames came from the West Country of England. The early settlers of Dorchester, Massachusetts, for instance, had come under the guidance of Rev. John White of Dorchester in Dorset, and some of them (like Eames) later moved to Hingham. Accounts from Hingham's earliest years indicate some friction between the disparate groups, culminating in a 1645 episode involving the town's "trainband", when some Hingham settlers supported Eames, and others supported Bozoan Allen, a prominent early Hingham settler and Hobart ally who came from King's Lynn in Norfolk. Prominent East Anglian Puritans like the Hobarts and the Cushings, for instance, were used to holding sway in matters of governance. Eventually the controversy became so heated that John Winthrop and Thomas Dudley were drawn into the fray; minister Hobart threatened to excommunicate Eames.

The bitter trainband controversy dragged on for several years, culminating in stiff fines. Eventually a weary Eames, who was in his mid-fifties when the controversy began and who had served Hingham as first militia captain, a selectman, and Deputy in the General Court, threw in the towel and moved to nearby Marshfield where he again served as Deputy and emerged as a leading citizen, despite his brush with the Hingham powers-that-be.

Although the town was incorporated in 1635, the colonists did not get around to negotiating purchase from the Wampanoag, the Native American tribe in the region, until three decades later. On July 4, 1665, the tribe's chief sachem, Josiah Wompatuck, sold the township to Capt. Joshua Hobart (brother of Rev. Peter Hobart) and Ensign John Thaxter (father of Col. Samuel Thaxter), representatives of Hingham's colonial residents. Having occupied the land for 30 years, the Englishmen presumably felt entitled to a steep discount. The sum promised Josiah Wompatuck for the land encompassing Hingham was to be paid by two Hingham landowners: Lieut. John Smith and Deacon John Leavitt, who had been granted 12 acres (49,000 m^{2}) on Hingham's Turkey Hill earlier that year. Now the two men were instructed to deliver payment for their 12-acre (49,000 m^{2}) grant to Josiah the chief Sachem. The grant to Smith and Leavitt—who together bought other large tracts from the Native Americans for themselves and their partners—was "on condition that they satisfy all the charge about the purchase of the town's land of Josiah—Indian sagamore, both the principal purchase and all the other charge that hath been about it". With that payment the matter was considered settled.

The third town clerk of Hingham was Daniel Cushing, who emigrated to Hingham from Hingham, Norfolk, with his father Matthew in 1638. Cushing's meticulous records of early Hingham enabled subsequent town historians to reconstruct much of early Hingham history as well as that of the early families. Cushing was rather unusual in that he included the town's gossip along with the more conventional formal record-keeping.

== Geography ==
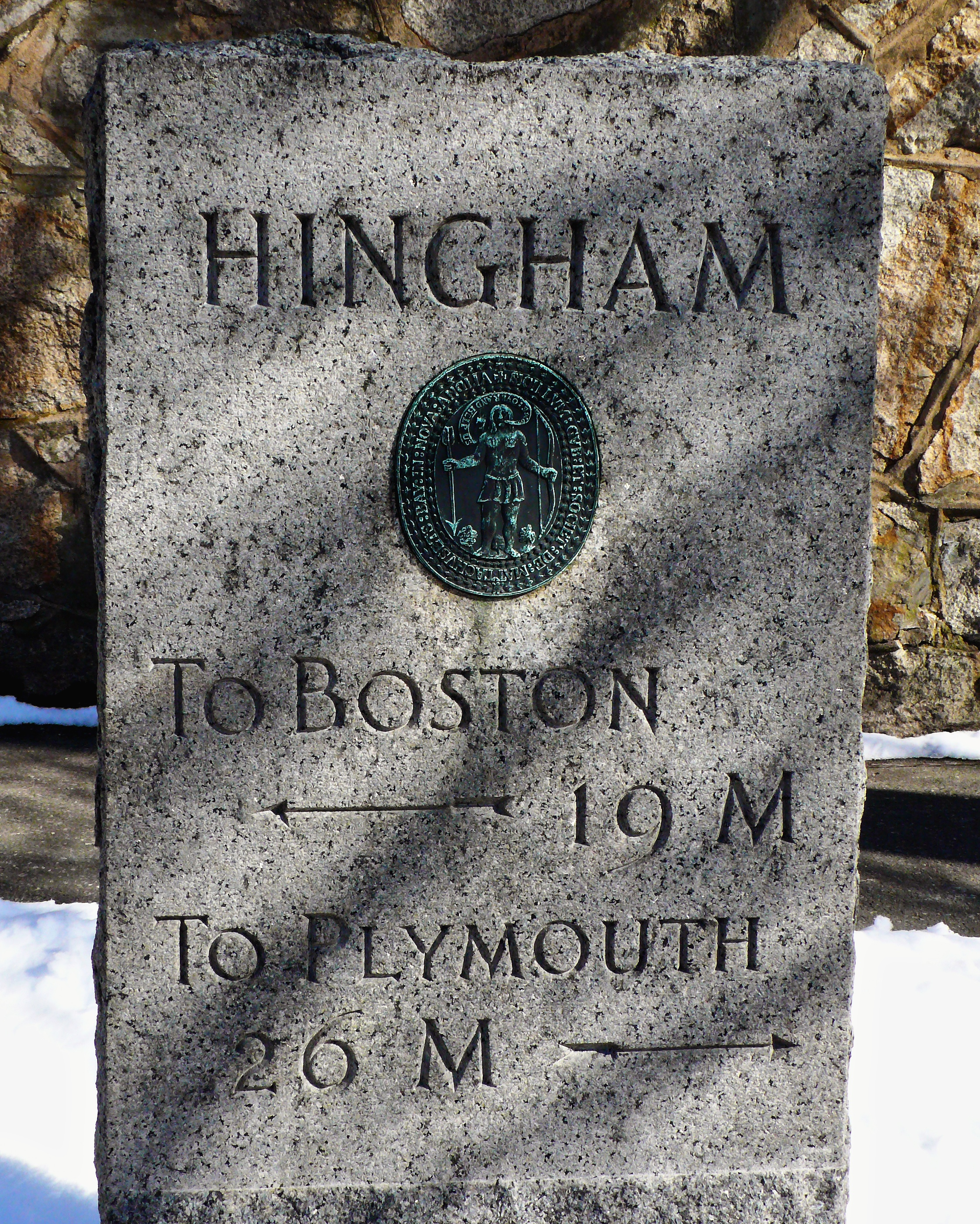
Hingham distance marker

According to the United States Census Bureau, the town has a total area of 26.3 square miles (68.1 km^{2}), of which 22.2 square miles (57.5 km^{2}) is land and 4.1 square miles (10.6 km^{2}), or 15.58%, is water. Hingham is bordered on the east by Cohasset, and Scituate, on the south by Norwell and Rockland, on the west by Weymouth, and on the north by Hingham Bay and Hull. Cohasset and Weymouth are in Norfolk County; the other towns, like Hingham itself, are in Plymouth County. Hingham is 14 miles (23 km) southeast of Boston.

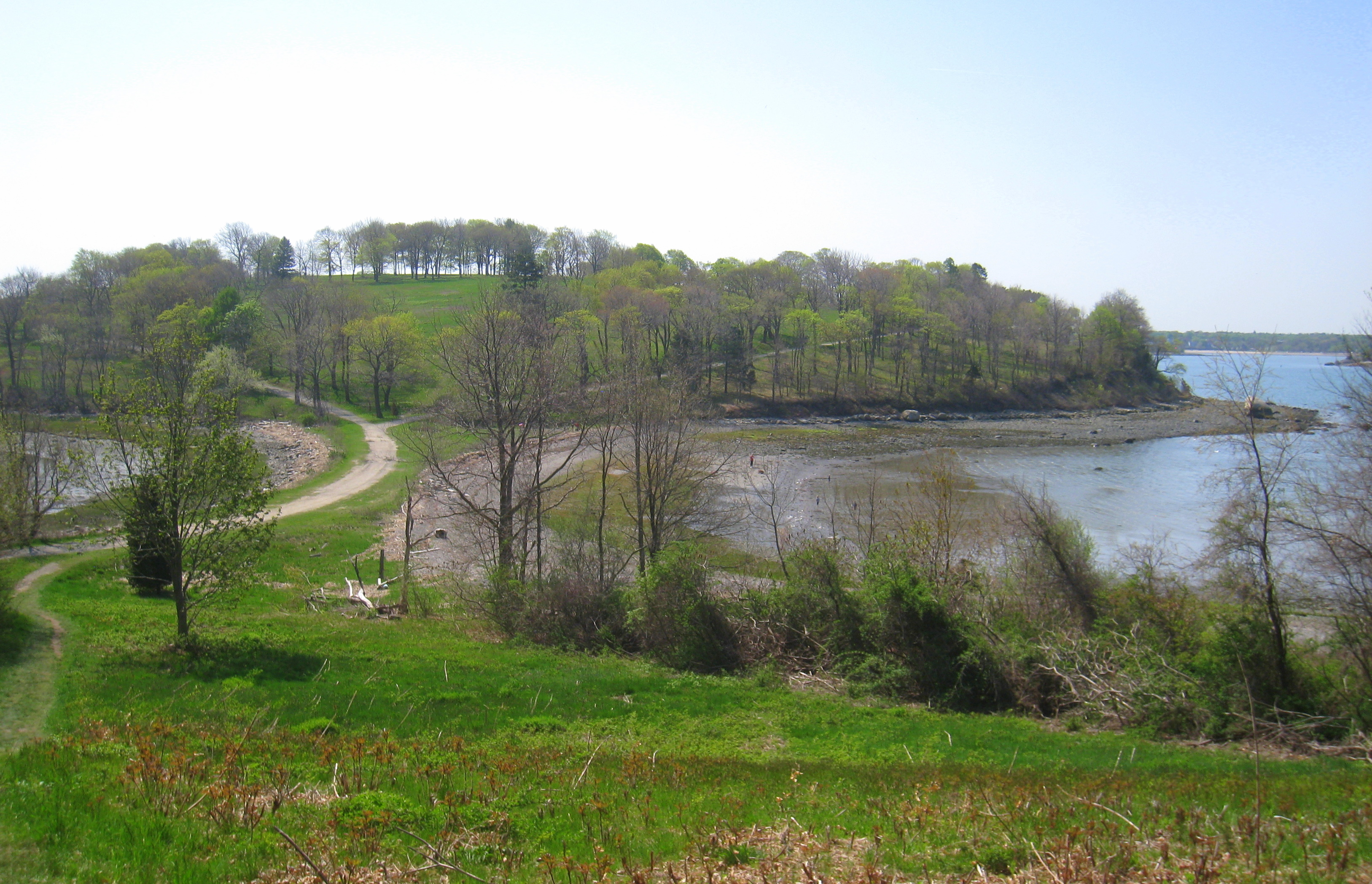
World's End park in Hingham.

Hingham lies along the southwestern corner of Boston Harbor. The bay leads to a harbor, which cuts a U-shaped indentation into the northern shore of the town. The town is separated from Hull by the Weir River and its tributary, which leads to the Straits Pond. The northern third of the town's border with Weymouth consists of the Weymouth Back River, which empties out into Hingham Bay. There are several other small ponds and brooks throughout town. The town also has several forests and parks, the largest of which, Wompatuck State Park, spreads into the neighboring towns of Cohasset, Scituate and Norwell. There are also several conservation areas throughout town; the portion of the Boston Harbor Islands National Recreation Area in Hingham includes Bumpkin Island, Button Island, Langlee Island, Ragged Island, Sarah Island and the World's End Reservation, which juts out into the bay. There is a marina along the mouth of the Weymouth Back River, and a public beach along the harbor.

=== Climate ===
According to the Köppen Climate Classification system, Hingham has a humid subtropical climate, abbreviated "Cfa" on climate maps. The hottest temperature recorded in Hingham was ? on June 23, 1888, July 17–18, 1900, July 9, 1912, July 22, 2011, and July 24, 2022, while the coldest temperature recorded was −13 °F (−25.0 °C) on January 22, 1961 and January 22, 1984.

Climate data for Hingham, Massachusetts, 1991–2020 normals, extremes 1885–present
Month	Jan	Feb	Mar	Apr	May	Jun	Jul	Aug	Sep	Oct	Nov	Dec	Year
Record high °F (°C)	70 (21)	73 (23)	89 (32)	95 (35)	97 (36)	101 (38)	101 (38)	100 (38)	97 (36)	88 (31)	81 (27)	77 (25)	101 (38)
Mean maximum °F (°C)	58.9 (14.9)	59.3 (15.2)	68.3 (20.2)	81.3 (27.4)	88.5 (31.4)	91.6 (33.1)	94.5 (34.7)	93.1 (33.9)	88.7 (31.5)	79.5 (26.4)	70.6 (21.4)	62.0 (16.7)	96.3 (35.7)
Mean daily maximum °F (°C)	37.9 (3.3)	40.4 (4.7)	47.0 (8.3)	58.4 (14.7)	68.5 (20.3)	77.2 (25.1)	83.0 (28.3)	81.5 (27.5)	73.8 (23.2)	62.9 (17.2)	52.4 (11.3)	42.9 (6.1)	60.5 (15.8)
Daily mean °F (°C)	29.8 (−1.2)	31.6 (−0.2)	38.1 (3.4)	48.4 (9.1)	58.2 (14.6)	67.3 (19.6)	73.2 (22.9)	71.8 (22.1)	64.5 (18.1)	53.6 (12.0)	43.9 (6.6)	35.2 (1.8)	51.3 (10.7)
Mean daily minimum °F (°C)	21.7 (−5.7)	22.9 (−5.1)	29.2 (−1.6)	38.3 (3.5)	47.9 (8.8)	57.3 (14.1)	63.4 (17.4)	62.2 (16.8)	55.3 (12.9)	44.2 (6.8)	35.4 (1.9)	27.4 (−2.6)	42.1 (5.6)
Mean minimum °F (°C)	2.0 (−16.7)	5.2 (−14.9)	12.4 (−10.9)	25.9 (−3.4)	33.9 (1.1)	43.5 (6.4)	52.2 (11.2)	50.0 (10.0)	39.5 (4.2)	29.3 (−1.5)	19.9 (−6.7)	10.7 (−11.8)	0.3 (−17.6)
Record low °F (°C)	−21 (−29)	−16 (−27)	−2 (−19)	12 (−11)	22 (−6)	30 (−1)	41 (5)	34 (1)	24 (−4)	15 (−9)	2 (−17)	−14 (−26)	−21 (−29)
Average precipitation inches (mm)	4.49 (114)	3.97 (101)	5.39 (137)	4.64 (118)	3.78 (96)	4.04 (103)	3.56 (90)	3.83 (97)	3.90 (99)	5.22 (133)	4.43 (113)	5.07 (129)	52.32 (1,330)
Average snowfall inches (cm)	14.8 (38)	14.5 (37)	10.3 (26)	1.7 (4.3)	0.0 (0.0)	0.0 (0.0)	0.0 (0.0)	0.0 (0.0)	0.0 (0.0)	0.1 (0.25)	0.7 (1.8)	8.8 (22)	50.9 (129.35)
Average extreme snow depth inches (cm)	9.3 (24)	9.1 (23)	7.2 (18)	1.2 (3.0)	0.0 (0.0)	0.0 (0.0)	0.0 (0.0)	0.0 (0.0)	0.0 (0.0)	0.1 (0.25)	0.4 (1.0)	5.1 (13)	14.6 (37)
Average precipitation days (≥ 0.01 in)	13.1	11.3	11.9	12.2	13.3	11.4	10.0	9.2	9.4	11.6	11.3	12.4	137.1
Average snowy days (≥ 0.1 in)	7.6	6.9	4.8	0.8	0.0	0.0	0.0	0.0	0.0	0.1	0.7	4.7	25.6
Source 1: NOAA
Source 2: National Weather Service

== Demographics ==
Historical population
Year	Pop.	±%
1790	2,085	—
1850	3,980	+90.9%
1860	4,351	+9.3%
1870	4,422	+1.6%
1880	4,485	+1.4%
1890	4,564	+1.8%
1900	5,059	+10.8%
1910	4,965	−1.9%
1920	5,604	+12.9%
1930	6,657	+18.8%
1940	8,003	+20.2%
1950	10,665	+33.3%
1960	15,378	+44.2%
1970	18,845	+22.5%
1980	20,339	+7.9%
1990	19,821	−2.5%
2000	19,882	+0.3%
2010	22,157	+11.4%
2020	24,284	+9.6%
2024*	24,414	+0.5%
* = population estimate. Source: United States Census records and Population Estimates Program data.

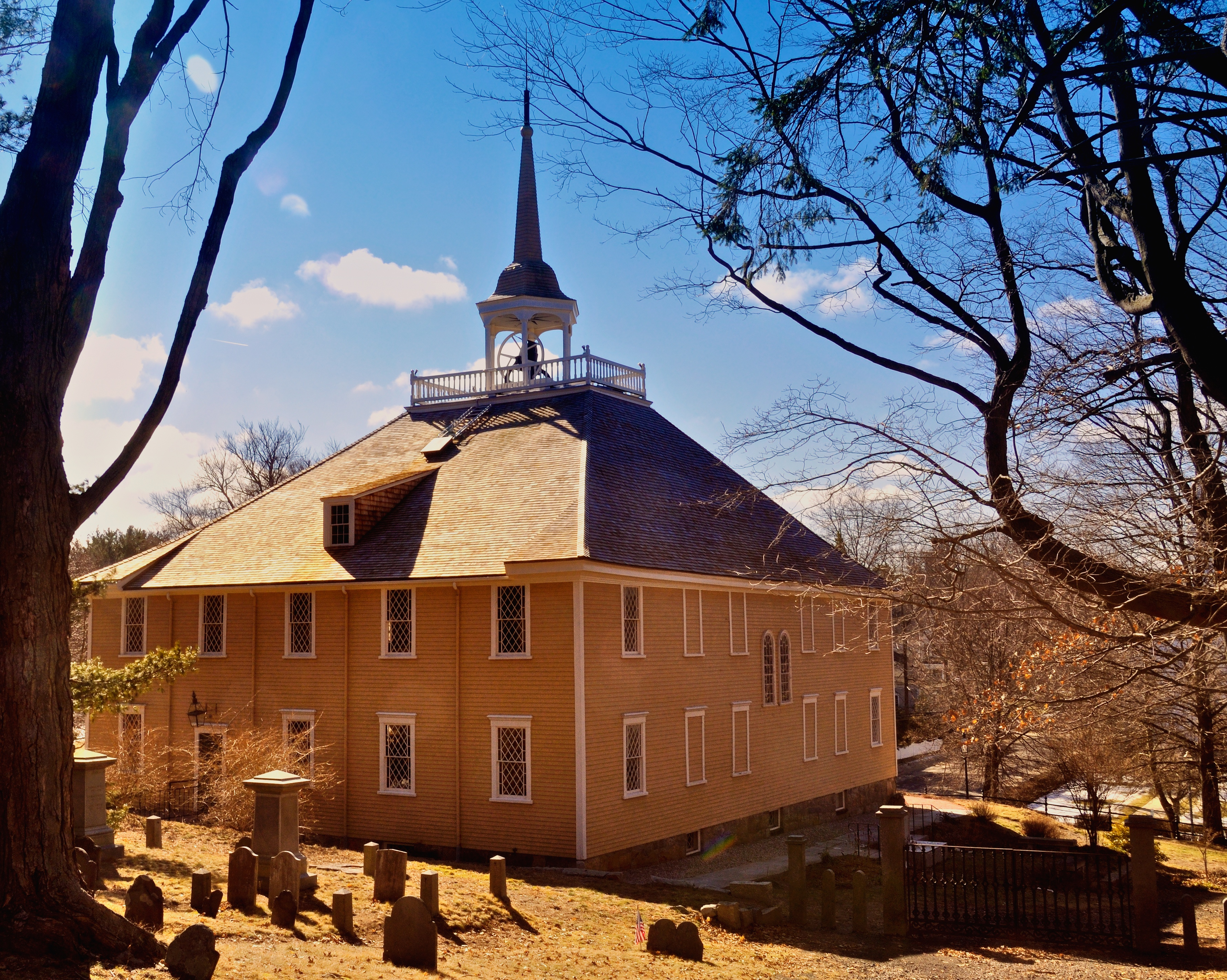
The Old Ship Church, Hingham (Seventeenth-century English Colonial architecture)

The U.S. Census Bureau estimates, there are 24,284 people and 8,873 households in the town. The population density was 884.8 inhabitants per square mile (341.6/km^{2}). There were 7,368 housing units at an average density of 327.9 per square mile (126.6/km^{2}). The racial makeup of the town was 97.5% White, 0.40% Black or African American, 0.04% Native American, 0.88% Asian, 0.02% Pacific Islander, 0.22% from other races, and 0.95% from two or more races. Hispanic or Latino of any race were 0.75% of the population.

There were 7,189 households, out of which 37.8% had children under the age of 18 living with them, 65.7% were married couples living together, 8.5% had a female householder with no husband present, and 23.8% were non-families. 21.0% of all households were made up of individuals, and 10.1% had someone living alone who was 65 years of age or older. The average household size was 2.72 and the average family size was 3.19.

In the town, the population was spread out, with 27.7% under the age of 18, 4.3% from 18 to 24, 26.3% from 25 to 44, 27.5% from 45 to 64, and 14.1% who were 65 years of age or older. The median age was 40 years. For every 100 females, there were 89.5 males. For every 100 females age 18 and over, there were 85.6 males.

The median household income in the town was $142,435 (mean household income was $206,876), and the median family income was $198,900 (mean family income was $265,292) in 2019. Males had a median income of $66,802 versus $41,370 for females. The per capita income in 2019 for the town was $78,301. About 2.4% of families and 3.5% of the population were below the poverty line, including 4.7% of those under age 18 and 3.1% of those age 65 or over.

== Economy ==
=== Top employers ===
According to the Town's 2025 Annual Comprehensive Financial Report, the top employers in the town are:

#	Employer	# of employees
1	Blue Cross/Blue Shield	1,494
2	Town of Hingham	1,081
3	Linden Ponds	760
4	Serono Laboratories	450
5	Talbots	410
6	Whole Foods	221
7	Russ Electric	203
6	Harbor House	181
9	Stop & Shop	179
10	Eat Well	175

== Government ==
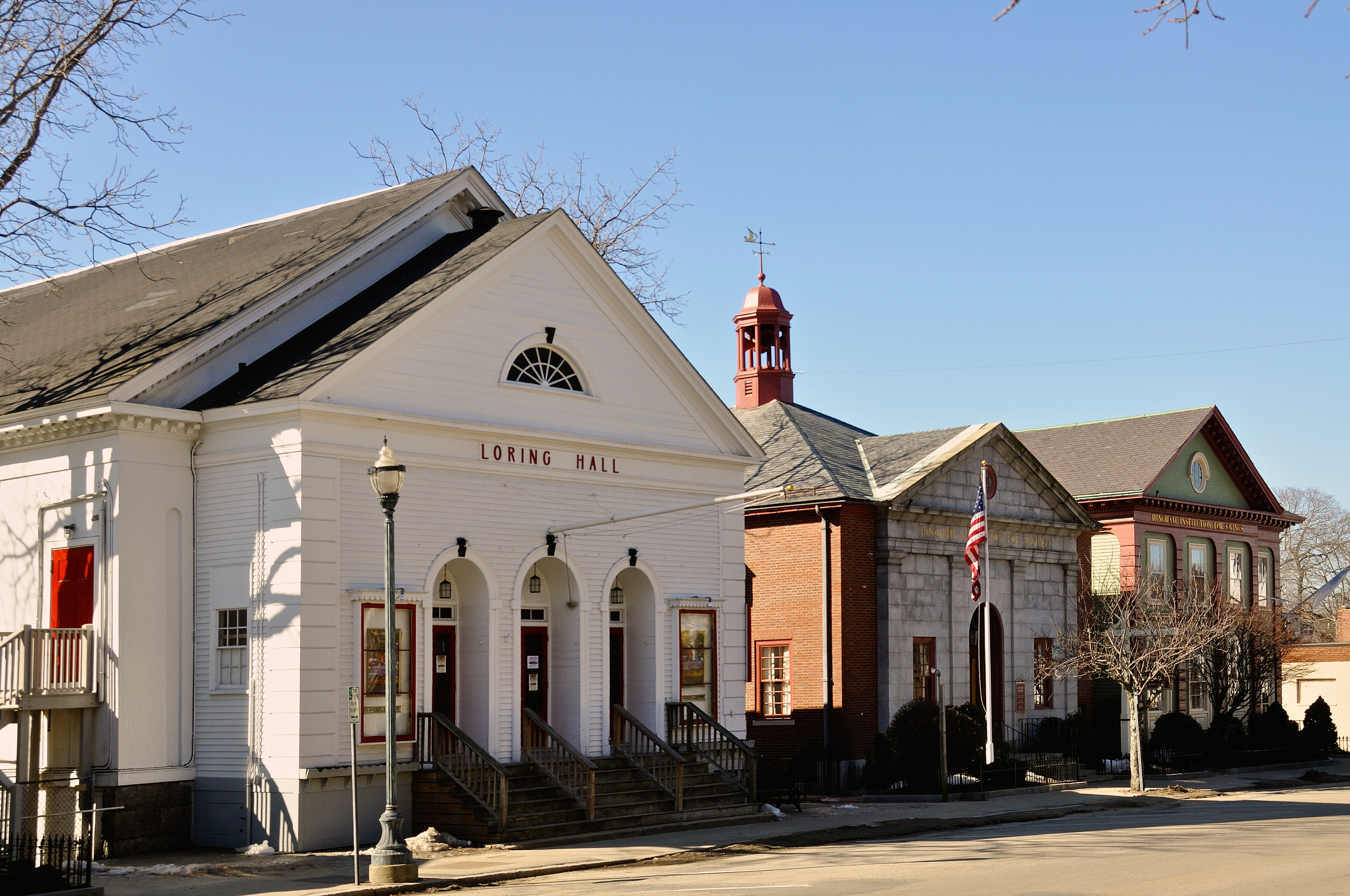
Loring Hall, Main Street

On the national level, Hingham is a part of Massachusetts's 8th congressional district, and is currently represented by Stephen Lynch. The state's senior member of the United States Senate is Elizabeth Warren. The state's junior Senator is Ed Markey, who was elected in a special election in 2013 to fill the seat vacated by John Kerry being appointed as United States Secretary of State.

On the state level, Hingham is represented in the Massachusetts House of Representatives as a part of the Third Plymouth district, by Joan Meschino. The district also includes Cohasset, Hull and North Scituate. The town is represented in the Massachusetts Senate as a part of the Plymouth and Norfolk district, by Patrick O'Connor. The district also includes the towns of Cohasset, Duxbury, Hull, Marshfield, Norwell, Scituate and Weymouth. The town is patrolled on a secondary basis by the First (Norwell) Barracks of Troop D of the Massachusetts State Police.

Hingham is governed on the local level by the open town meeting form of government, and is led by a town administrator and a three-member select board. The members of the board of selectmen are William Ramsey, Liz Klein, and Joe Fisher. The town hall is located in the former Central Junior High School building, which it moved into in 1995. The town has its own police and fire departments, with a central police station next to the town hall and fire houses located near the town common, in West Hingham, and in South Hingham. The town's nearest hospital is South Shore Hospital in Weymouth, where all emergency calls are sent. There are two post offices in town, one in downtown Hingham on North Street and another in South Hingham right on Route 53. The town's public library is located on Leavitt Street in Center Hingham, and is part of the Old Colony Library Network.

Voter Registration and Party Enrollment as of January 2, 2025
Party	Number of Voters	Percentage
Democratic	4,478	22.31%
Republican	2,471	12.31%
Unenrolled	12,962	64.58%
Political Designations	159	0.79%
Registered Voters	20,070	100%

== Infrastructure ==
=== Education ===
Hingham is home to seven public schools:

- Hingham High School
- South Shore Educational Collaborative
- Hingham Middle School
- East Elementary School
- Foster Elementary School
- Plymouth River Elementary School
- South Elementary School

Hingham is home to five private schools:

- Derby Academy
- Notre Dame Academy
- St. Paul School
- Old Colony Montessori School
- Su Escuela Language Academy

=== Transportation ===
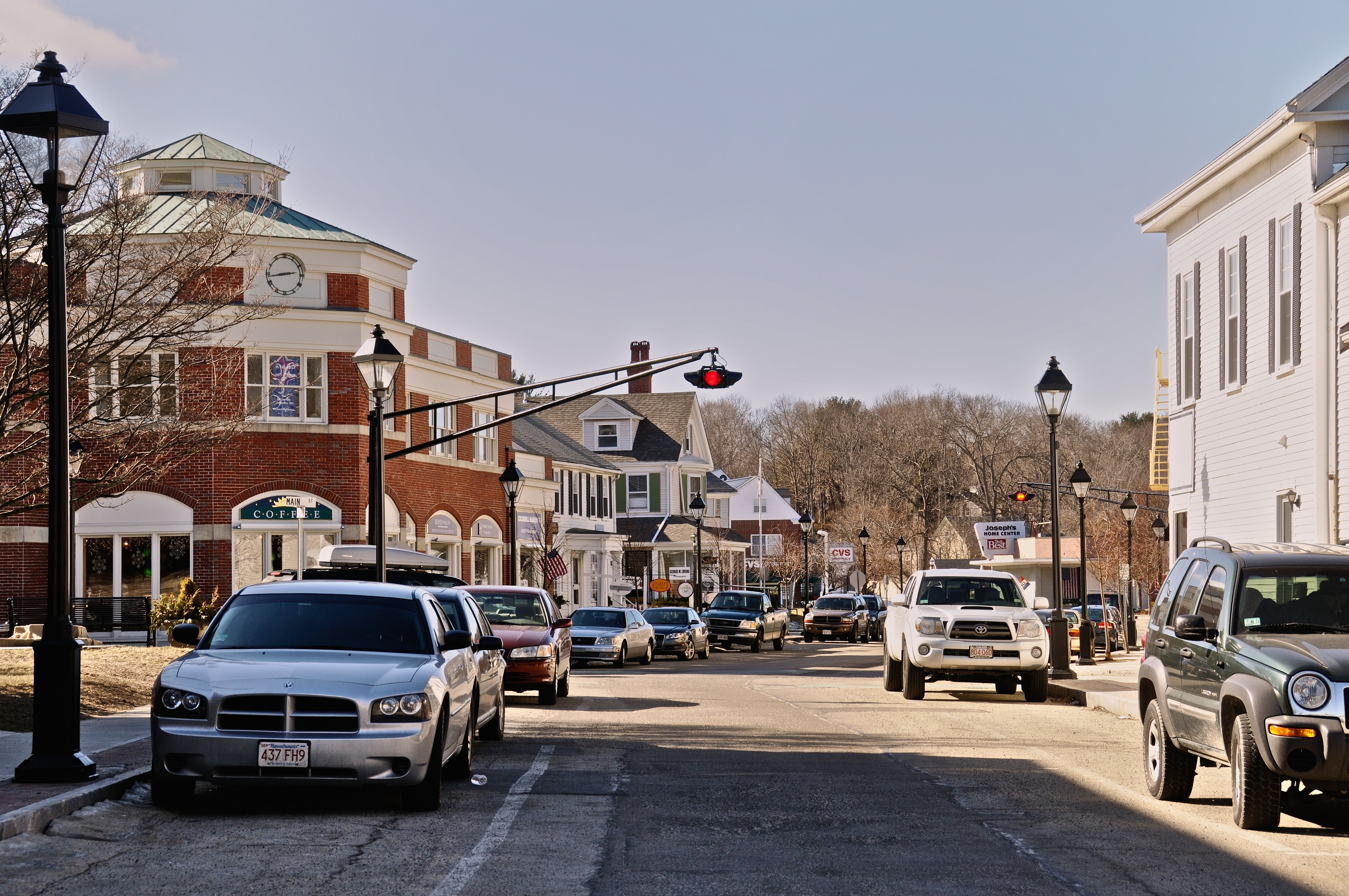
South Street, Hingham

A small portion of Route 3 passes through the southwestern corner of town, with one exit in town and another at Route 228 just south of the town line. Routes 3A and 53 also cross through the town, the latter mirroring the path of Route 3. Route 228 passes from north to south in town; the rest all pass from west to east.

Public transportation is currently served by MBTA ferry route F2H and F1 service from the Hingham Shipyard to Rowes Wharf in downtown Boston, MBTA bus routes 220 and 222, and the MBTA Commuter Rail Greenbush Line service to Boston South Station with stops at West Hingham and Nantasket Junction. There is no air service in the town; the nearest airport is Logan International Airport in Boston as well as smaller public airports in Norwood and Marshfield.

== Notable people ==
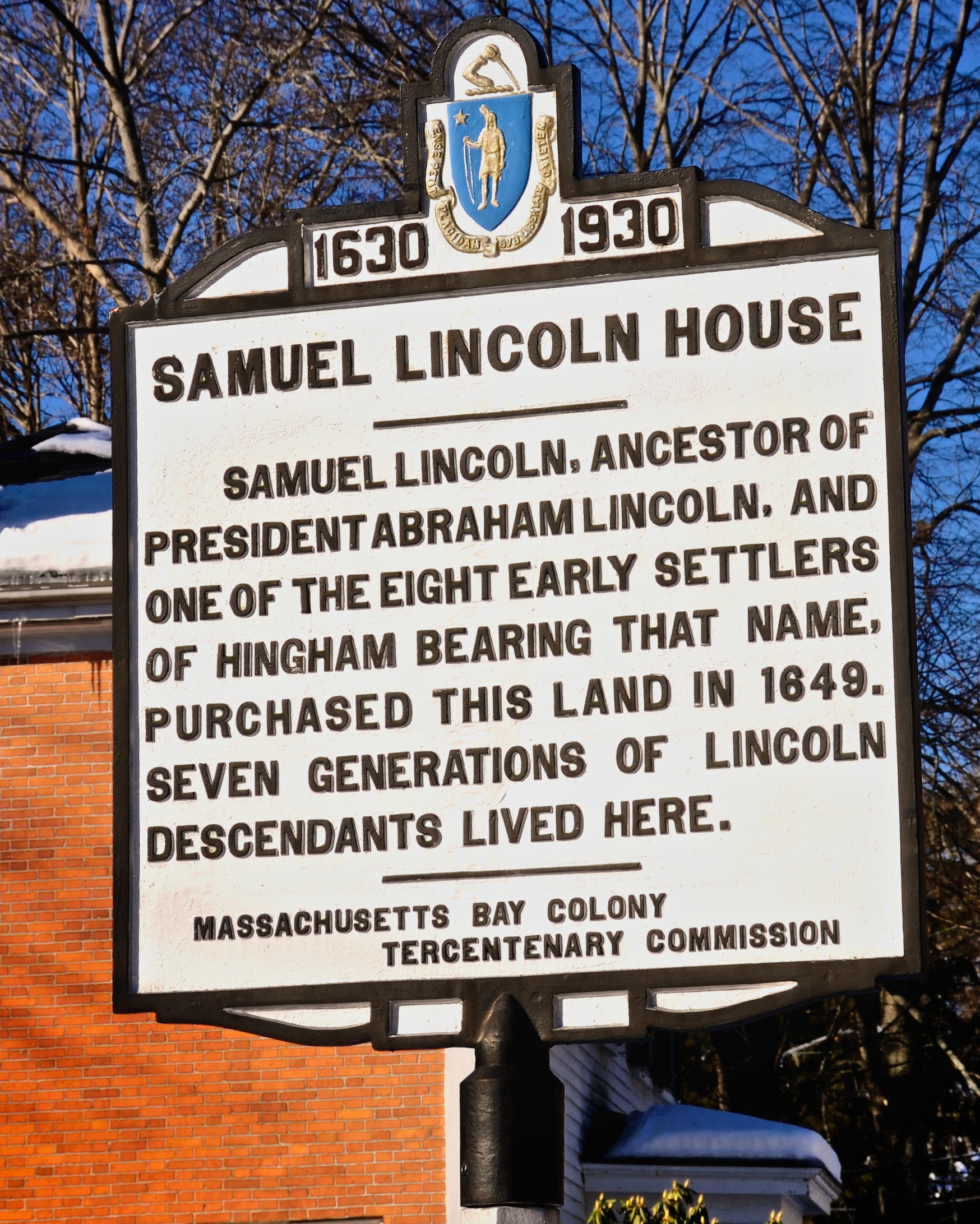
Historical marker, Samuel Lincoln House

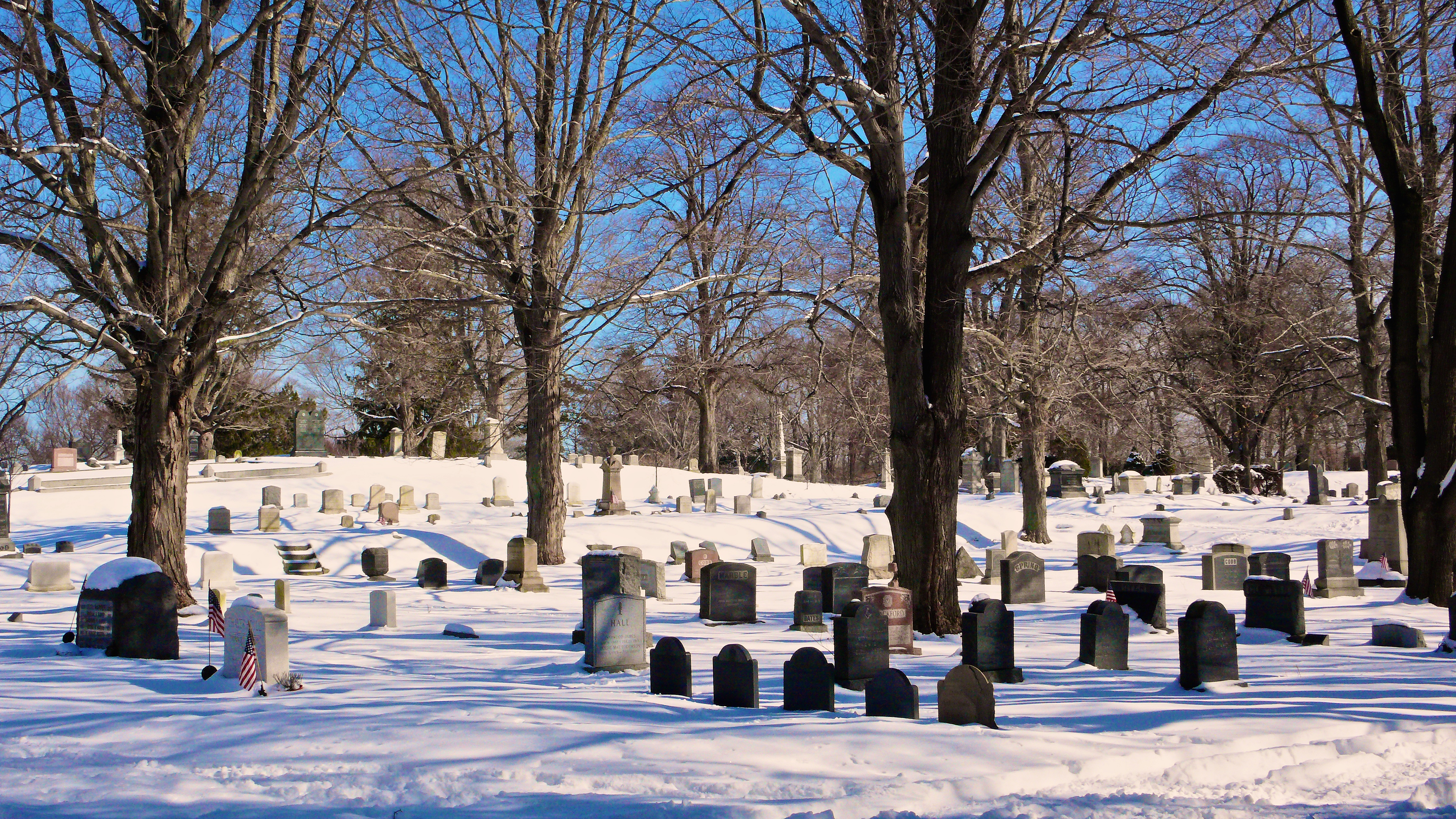
Old Burying Ground

Hingham's most famous line of citizens came from two unrelated families named Lincoln who emigrated to Massachusetts from the English county of Norfolk in the seventeenth century, from Hingham and Swanton Morley, respectively. A bridge in Hingham over Route 3, the Southeast Expressway, is named after American Revolutionary War General Benjamin Lincoln of the Swanton branch. General Lincoln is best remembered for accepting Cornwallis's sword of surrender at the Siege of Yorktown. But the most famous Hingham Lincoln never lived in the town: United States President and Civil War Commander-in-Chief Abraham Lincoln, descended from one of several Lincoln families who settled in Hingham – and unrelated to General Benjamin. A bronze statue, a replica of the famous sitting Lincoln Memorial in Washington D.C. sits at the foot of Lincoln Street at North Street.

- Tony Amonte, retired hockey player in the NHL
- John F. Andrew, 19th century United States Congressman
- Joanna Barnes, actress
- Catherine Barry, soccer player
- Bill Belichick owns a house in Hingham in the Black Rock Country Club residential community
- Matty Beniers, current ice hockey player in the NHL. The first ever draft pick by the Seattle Kraken
- Clifford Blair, Former hammer throw world record holder and Olympic qualifier
- Thomas Tracy Bouvé, merchant and president of the Boston Society of Natural History
- Brian Boyle, Former ice hockey player in the NHL
- Wilmon Brewer, lifelong Hingham author and philanthropist
- Mary A. Brinkman, homeopathic physician
- Marc Brown, author, illustrator, and creator of the children's television show Arthur
- Prescott Bush Jr., brother of 41st President George H. W. Bush and Uncle of 43rd President George W. Bush
- Herbert L. Foss, recipient of the Medal of Honor in the Spanish–American War
- Bob Graham, former governor and senator from Florida and a 2004 presidential candidate resided part time in Hingham
- Harold Hackett, four-time U.S. Open tennis doubles champion
- Lloyd P. Jones, Bethlehem Steel executive and son of Willard F. Jones, resided with his family in Hingham while working at the Bethlehem Shipbuilding Corporation
- King Kelly, 19th Century Baseball Hall of Fame. Given a home on Main Street, Hingham by loving fans of Boston. Slide, Kelly, Slide (Scarecrow Press 1996)
- Bruce H. Mann, Harvard Law School professor and husband of presidential candidate Elizabeth Warren
- David McCullough, Pulitzer Prize winning author and historian resided part-time in Hingham
- Pierre McGuire, ice hockey analyst and former NHL coach and scout
- Marty McInnis, retired hockey player in the NHL
- Alice Merryweather, Olympic alpine skier
- Jay O'Brien, ice hockey player
- Richard Phillips, NCAA high jump champion
- Judson Pratt, stage, film and television actor
- Lilly Reale, soccer player
- Dallas Lore Sharp, professor at Boston University, settled with his family (including Waitstill Sharp) in Hingham. Much of his writing celebrated Hingham's natural beauty.
- Allen Stack, 1948 100m backstroke Olympic gold medalist
