= Simocybe ramosa =

Scientific classification
- Kingdom: Fungi
- Division: Basidiomycota
- Class: Agaricomycetes
- Order: Agaricales
- Family: Crepidotaceae
- Genus: Simocybe
- Species: S. ramosa

Binomial name
- Simocybe ramosa Mortier, Haelewaters, Asselman, De Lange, Kuyper & Verbeken (2024)

Species of fungi

Simocybe ramosa is a species of saprotrophic mushroom in the family Crepidotaceae. It was described as new to science in 2024 from a single specimen discovered in the Boston Harbor Islands National Recreation Area in Massachusetts, United States. The species is considered rare and is currently known only from its type location.

== Description ==
The mushroom has a small, brown cap with colors of sienna, russet, and copper-brown, and note that the surface appears slightly fuzzy. The stem is often somewhat off-center, and the fruiting body is relatively small, reaching about 5–6 cm tall. The gills are attached to the stem.

== Unique features ==
Simocybe ramosa can be distinguished from other species in the genus by:

- its branching microscopic structures (the name ramosa refers to "branched")
- its specific DNA sequence in the ITS region
- small differences in spore characters compared to closely related species such as Simocybe rhabarbarina.

The species appears to be rare, as only one specimen has been documented so far.

== Distribution ==
This species is known only from Massachusetts, USA. It was first collected on the World's End peninsula in the Boston Harbor Islands National Recreation Area. As of its description, no other populations have been reported elsewhere in the world.

== Habitat and ecology ==
Simocybe ramosa is a saprotrophic fungus, meaning it grows on and breaks down dead wood. The type specimen was found beneath the bark of a dead oak tree. Because only a single specimen has been found, its complete habitat range and ecological preferences are not yet known.
