= Button Island (Massachusetts) =

Island in Plymouth County, Massachusetts, United States

Coordinates: 42°15′04.15″N 70°53′03.74″W

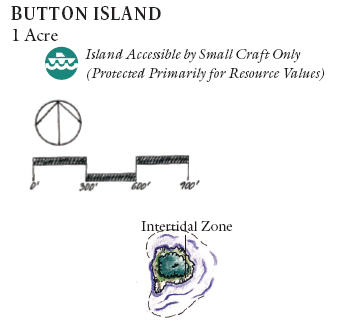
Map of Button Island, provided by the National Park Service.

Button Island is a small island in the Hingham Bay area of Boston Harbor Islands National and State Park. The island has a permanent size of under 1 acre (4,000 m^{2}), plus an intertidal zone of a further 116 acres (0.47 km^{2}). The island rises 10 feet in elevation and is composed primarily of glacial till. The island is managed by the town of Hingham.

The island is notable for a large oak tree. Several smaller but mature oaks, linden cedars, and sumacs cover the island. Shrub species include bayberry and dewberry. Grasses and sea lavender are abundant in the tidal zone.
