= Maurice W. Parker Sr. =

American voice coach

Maurice Wesley Parker Sr.
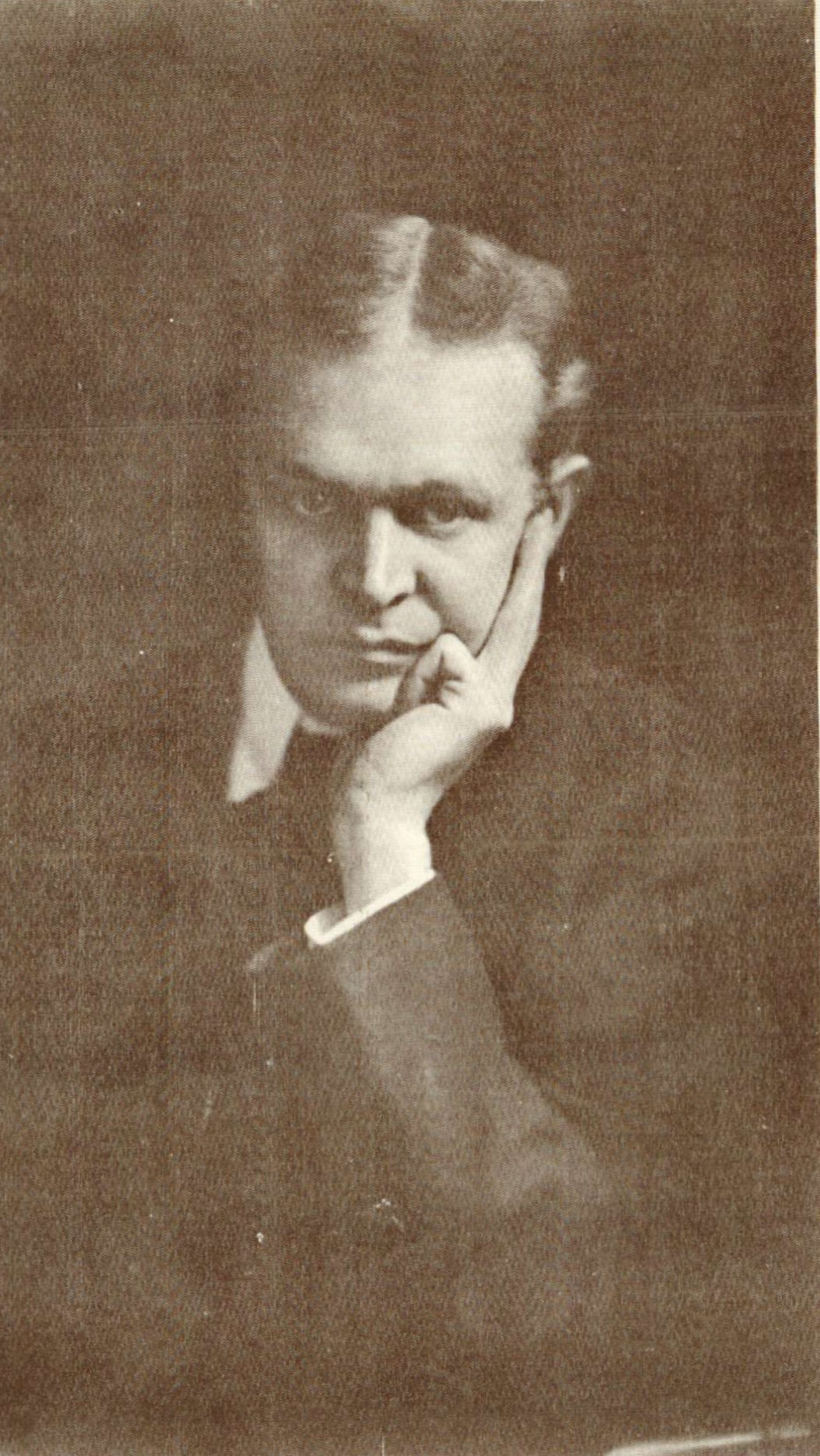
- Born: 1873; Chicago, Illinois, U.S.
- Died: 1958 (aged 84–85)
- Education: Harvard Medical School
- Occupation(s): Voice coach, marksman, billiards player, landscape painter, violin maker
- Spouse: Rosalia Besserer
- Children: 4

Maurice Wesley Parker Sr. (1873–1958) was an American voice coach, record-setting marksman, champion billiard player, landscape painter and violin maker.

== Education ==
Parker was born in Chicago, Illinois, and attended Harvard Medical School. At the time, it appears that medical students went into the poorer districts of Boston and provided medical care as part of their training. Parker did this and delivered seven babies. The medical courses that interested him most were those on the throat and vocal organs, which he studied under a prominent authority, Dr. Joseph Goodale. While at Harvard, Parker contracted a severe case of typhoid fever, which resulted in his discontinuing medical school and giving up medicine as a profession.

== Marksman ==
While in medical school, Parker joined the First Corps Cadets, which was part of the Massachusetts Volunteer Militia. Entering as a private, he became successively sergeant, battalion adjutant, and captain and inspector of rifles. For several years he was the leader of the rifle team, and was considered one of the most effective instructors in the country. The team from First Corps defeated not only all others in the militia, but also those representing the regular army and the navy. Parker himself set a world's record on some targets. These targets were subsequently changed, and the record has never been equaled. Matches included targets at distances up to 1,000 yards, and at this extreme range, Parker once made a score of 49 out of 50. In 1906, in a skirmish match involving running up toward a target and firing 20 shots at various distances, he made a perfect score, a record for all ranges in the United States.

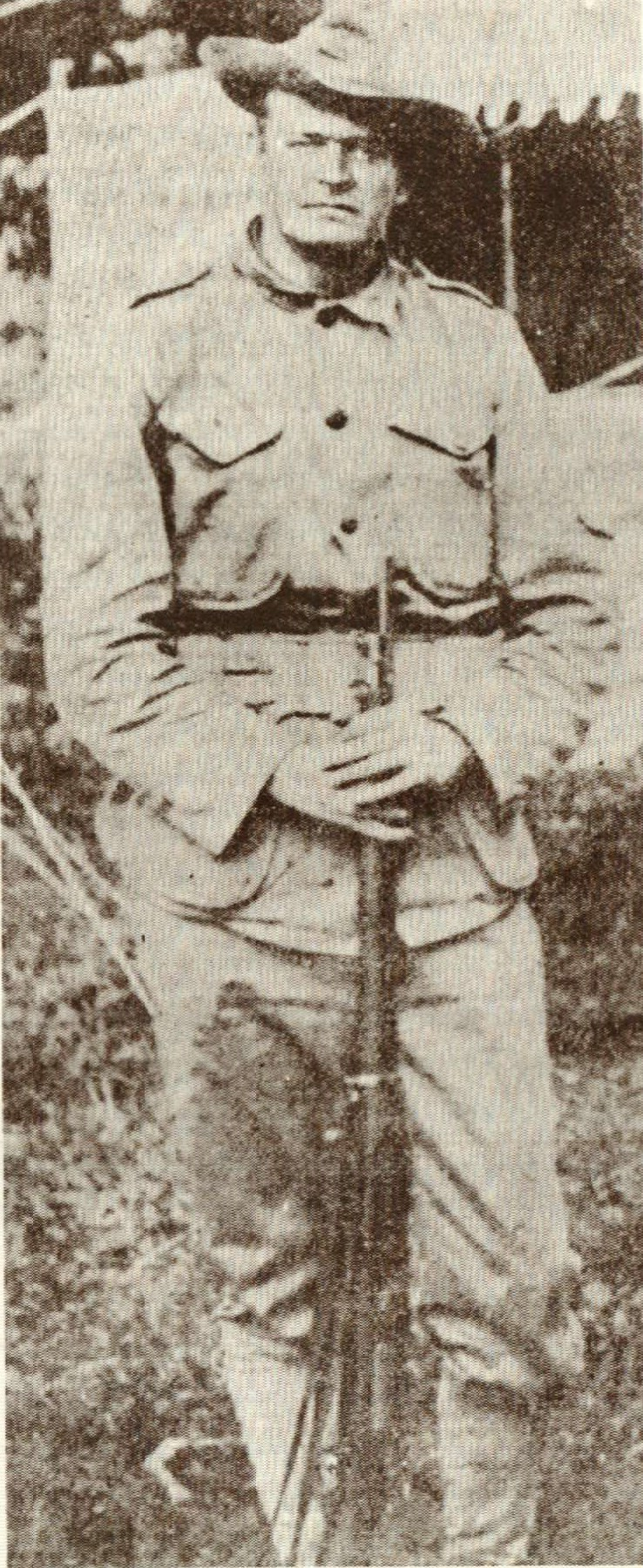
Parker at rifle range.

== Billiard Champion ==
His biographer, Wilmon Brewer, observed that Parker “seldom undertook anything in which he did not eventually excel.” In addition to marksmanship, his achievements in billiards is another example of this. He repeatedly won the Boston Athletic Association billiard championship, he became state billiard champion of Massachusetts, and in 1912, he won the amateur championship of New England.

== Voice Coach ==
Parker made his career as a voice and drama coach. Biographer Brewer states flatly that Parker “was the best dramatic coach in Boston.” Parker's pupils included performers in the Metropolitan Opera Company, ministers and actors. Pupils came to his Boston studio from as far away as New York. Physicians referred patients to him who had throat problems caused by faulty public speaking or singing. Parker also taught at the New England Conservatory of Music, and Beaver Country Day School, which is a private college-preparatory school in Brookline, MA.

Parker's interests included geology, astronomy, golf (he won father-son team club championships with two different sons), sailing, photography (including developing his own photos), and painting in oil and watercolors. Two of his paintings were featured in Wilmon Brewer's book, Adventures in Verse, and two of his photographs were published in American Photography magazine. An avid violinist, Parker experimented in making his own violins and bows, paying particular attention to the formula for the varnish, which he felt was a critical component to an excellent violin. Parker hired Rosalia Besserer, a pianist with remarkable sight-reading ability, as his accompanist. More than one professional singer regarded her as the best accompanist in greater Boston. Parker and Besserer married in 1907, and had four children. One of their children, M. Wesley Parker Jr., became president of Parker Mfg. Co., and one of their grandchildren, Wes Parker (M. Wesley Parker III), became first baseman for the Los Angeles Dodgers and won six consecutive Gold Glove Awards.
