= Weir River (Massachusetts) =

Coordinates: 42°15′20″N 70°51′40″W

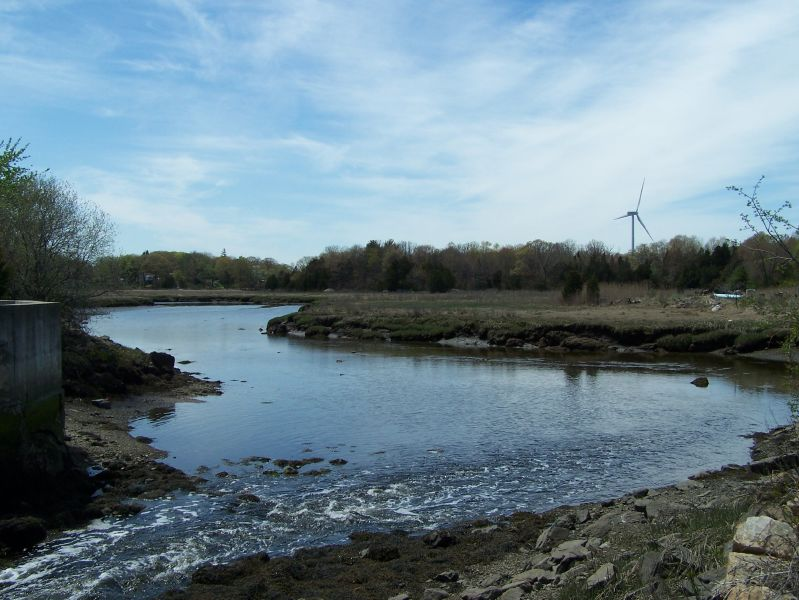
- Weir River at Hull looking east

Location
- Country: United States

Physical characteristics
- Length: 4 mi (6.4 km)
- Basin size: Hingham-Weir River Basin

Weir River is a short stream and estuary that empties into Hingham Bay, part of Boston Harbor in Massachusetts, United States. The name is attributed to the location of a fishing weir in the stream. The river gives its name to a larger watershed and Weir River Farm, a park and nature reserve owned by The Trustees of Reservations.

== Description ==
Weir River is formed at the confluence of Crooked Meadow River and Fulling Mill Brook in Hingham near the intersection of Free Street and Massachusetts Route 228 which are fed by Cushing Pond, Fulling Mill Pond, and the wetlands around Jacob's Meadow. The river flows north through Hingham and is joined by Tower Brook and Accord Brook in its first mile (1.6 km), then gradually turns northeast and travels another 1.4 miles (2.3 km) before being dammed to form Foundry Pond. The dam marks the southern boundary of the estuary, which is one of 30 areas designated by the Commonwealth of Massachusetts as an Area of Critical Environmental Concern. The estuary is split in two segments and extends over 1 mile (1.6 km) both east and north, forming the border between Hingham and the town of Hull to the north. On the west side of Weir River estuary lies World's End, another Trustees of Reservations park. The estuary reaches Hingham Bay at the north side of the World's End peninsula. Across the river from World's End are the Weir River Woods, owned by the town of Hull, with a parking lot owned by the Hull Land Conservation Trust. On the north side of the confluence with the Straits River, the Weir River Estuary Park is owned and jointly operated by the towns Hingham, Cohasset, and Hull.

In 2005, the Commonwealth of Massachusetts designated the Weir River Watershed as "high stressed", meaning the rate of dewatering, from seasonal low precipitation and water supply withdrawals, exceeds the rate of recharge, from natural rainfall, for extended periods during the year. The Weir River Watershed Association is the non-profit organization charged with stewardship of the Weir River.
