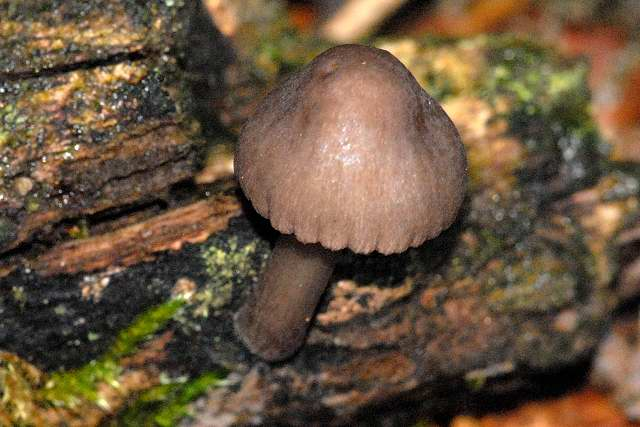
- Simocybe sumptuosa

Scientific classification
- Kingdom: Fungi
- Division: Basidiomycota
- Class: Agaricomycetes
- Order: Agaricales
- Family: Crepidotaceae
- Genus: Simocybe; P.Karst. (1879)

Type species
- Simocybe centunculus (Fr.) P.Karst. (1879)

= Simocybe =

Genus of fungi

Simocybe is a genus of fungi in the family Crepidotaceae. The genus is widely distributed, and contains 25 species.

== Species ==
- Simocybe atomacea
- Simocybe austrorubi
- Simocybe centunculus
- Simocybe haustellaris
- Simocybe luteomellea
- Simocybe phlebophora
- Simocybe pruinata
- Simocybe ramosa
- Simocybe reducta
- Simocybe serrulata
- Simocybe sumptuosa
- Simocybe tabacina
- Simocybe tiliophila
- Simocybe unica
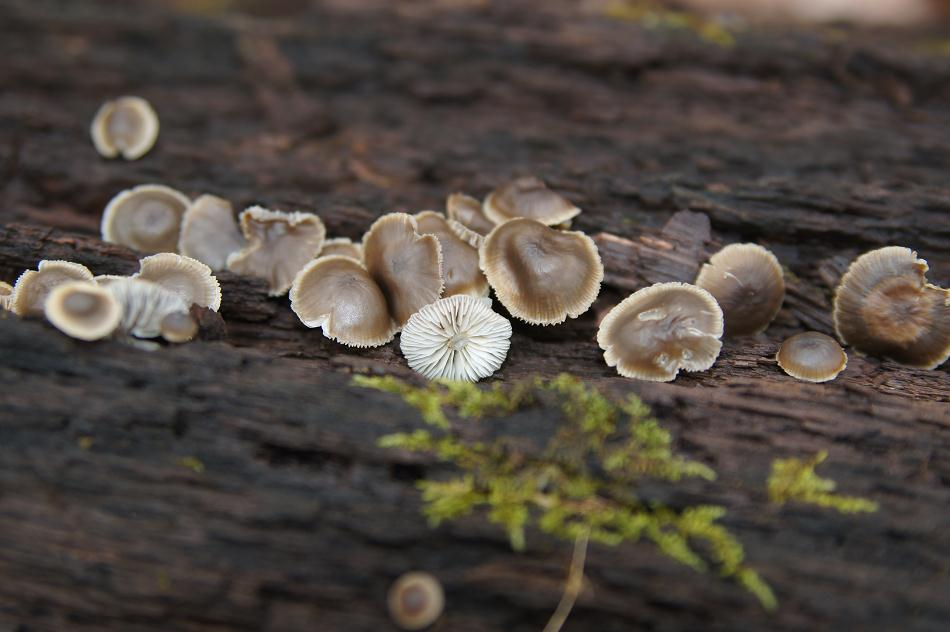
American simocybe (Simocybe centunculus) Elk Grove, IL
