= Ragged Island (Massachusetts) =

Island in Massachusetts, United States

Coordinates: 42°15′25.94″N 70°53′25.58″W

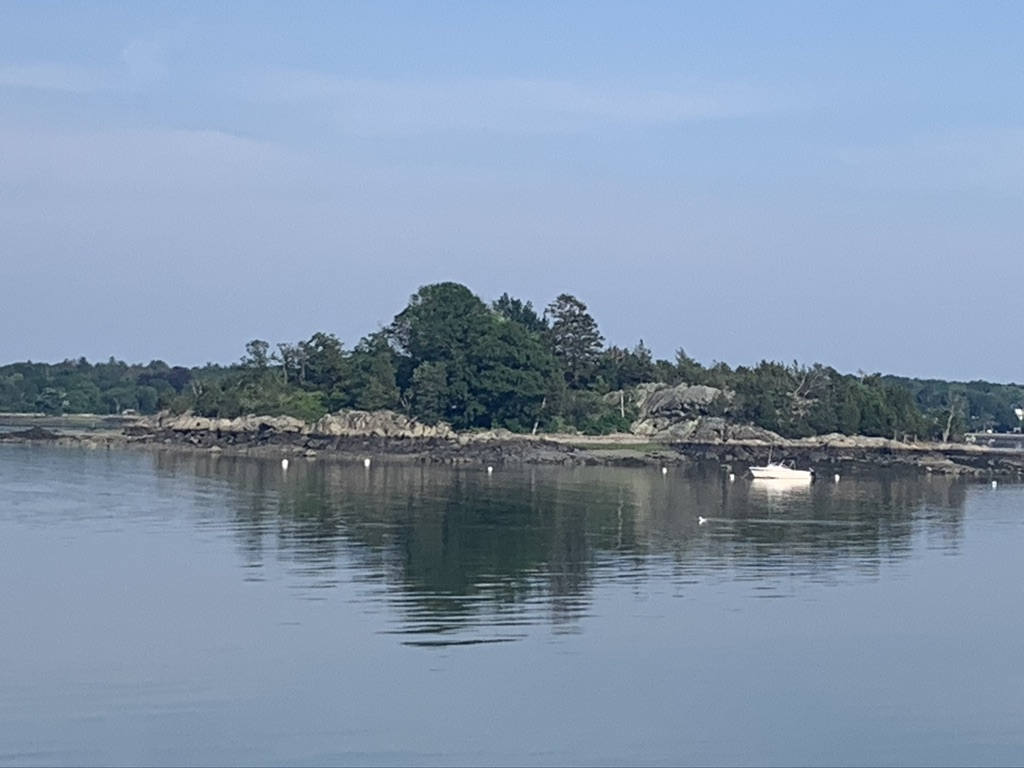
Ragged Island Hingham Ma

Ragged Island is an island in the Hingham Bay area of the Boston Harbor Islands National Recreation Area, in the U.S. state of Massachusetts. The island has a permanent size of 4 acres (16,000 m^{2}), and it is composed of Roxbury puddingstone (pebbles embedded in finer-grained cement) which rises to a height of 30 feet (9.1 m) above sea level. Broken ledges surround most of the island with small gravel beaches on the southeast and northwest sides; there are also small tidal mudflats.

The island was first occupied by John Langlee in the late seventeenth century. In the late nineteenth century, it was developed as part of a summer resort, and it has subsequently been the site of a restaurant and rustic observation shelters. Today, it is uninhabited and has a mix of cultivated and naturalized plants, including lily-of-the-valley, daylily, silver maple, red maple, Norway maple, cedar, Norway spruce, linden, greenbrier and poison ivy. The island is managed by the town of Hingham and access is by private boat only.
