= Wilmon Brewer =

American poet

Wilmon Brewer (1895–1998) was an American literary scholar, poet, writer and philanthropist.

== Early life ==
Brewer was born in Hingham, Massachusetts, and lived there for most of his life on his family's estate, Great Hill. When he was a young man, the family of his future wife, Katharine Hay More, purchased the property from Brewer's parents. During this time period, he and More fell in love. In the summer of 1922 they married, and then lived there, so even though the estate changed hands he lived on it essentially all his life.

Graduating from Harvard in 1917, magna cum laude, he volunteered for service in World War I. He served as a Second Lieutenant in the trench warfare in France and was awarded the Purple Heart. After the war, he returned to Harvard, taught English, and earned his master's degree and doctorate in English there.

The Brewer family has been prominent for two centuries, including James Brewer (1742–1806), who was an early American patriot leader, Thomas Mayo Brewer, who was a companion of naturalist John James Audubon, and Gen. Wilmon Blackmar, a Civil War medal of honor winner.

== Poet and author ==
A good example of Brewer's skill as a classical scholar is his book Ovid's Metamorphoses in European Culture. This study provides commentary on the Brookes More (Brewer's father-in-law) translation of Ovid's work, which is recognized as one of the masterpieces of the golden age of Latin literature (written in AD 8, by this famous Roman poet). Brewer's book traces the Greek and Roman origins of the epic poem, as well as the subsequent influence on later European writers, such as Chaucer and Shakespeare. Brewer provides a comprehensive analysis of how the 15-book Metamorphoses influenced the entire history of Western culture.

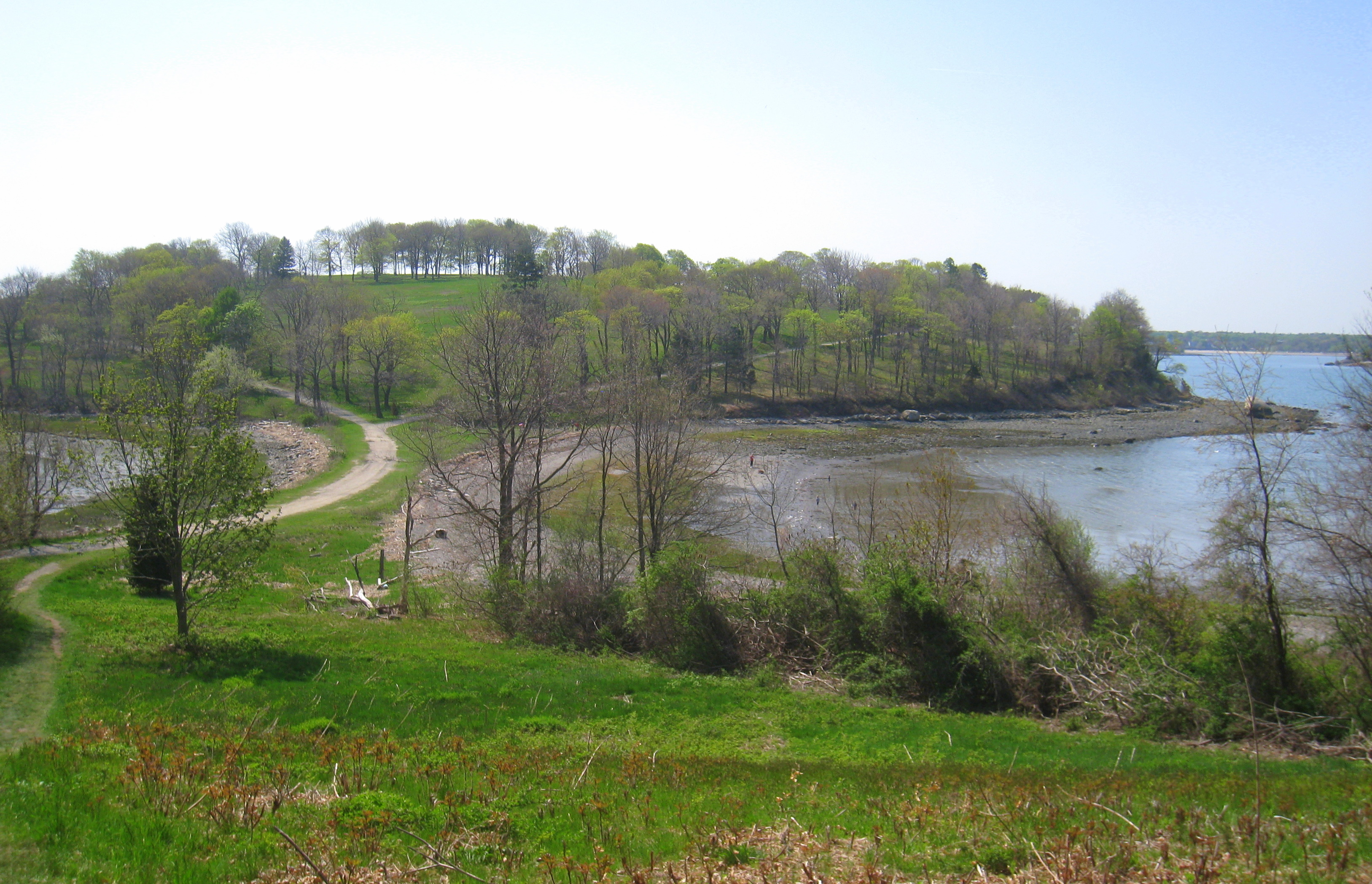
World's End, Hingham, MA.

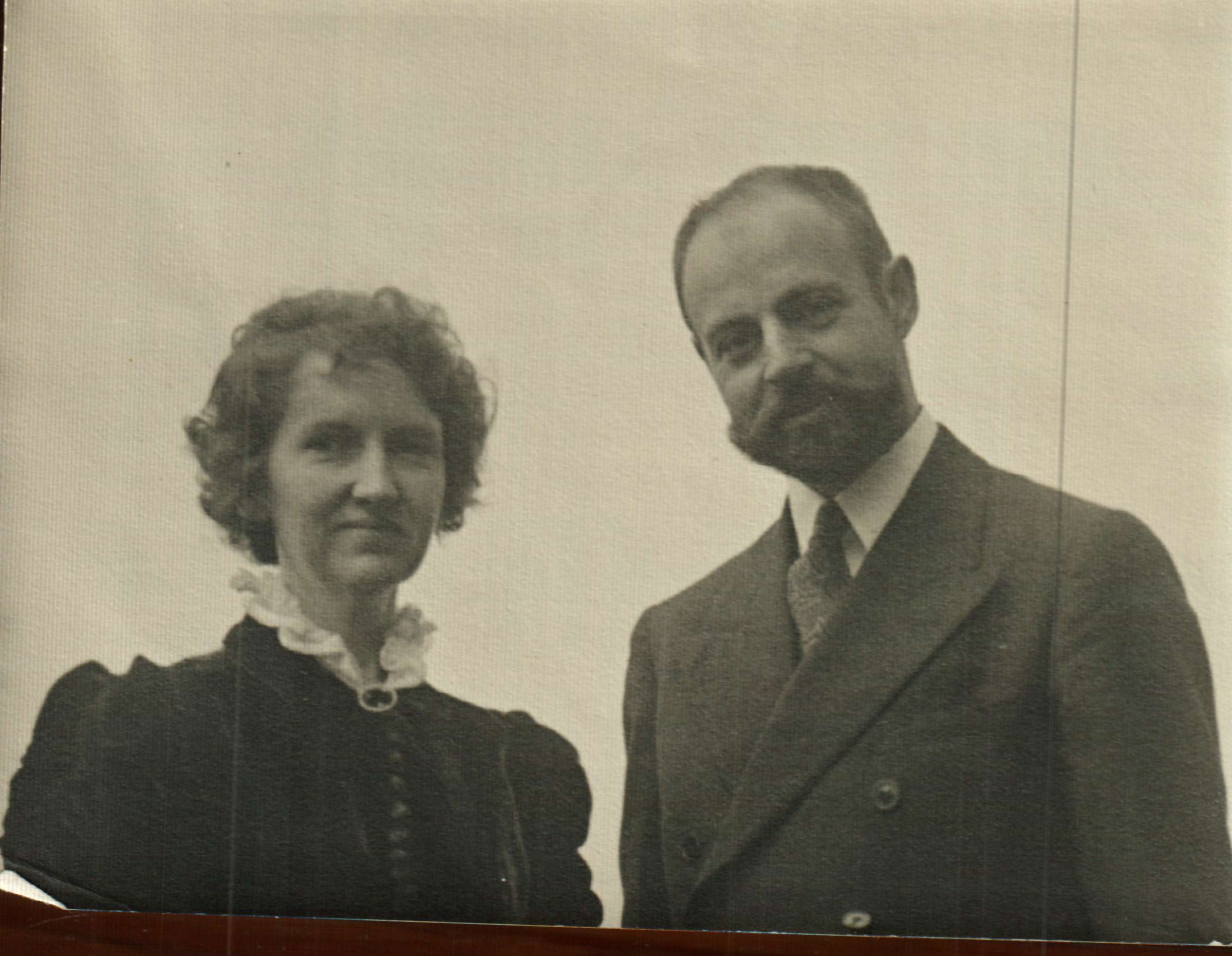
Katharine and Wilmon Brewer

Brewer was a prolific poet himself, publishing a number of books of poetry. He was also a biographer, writing a biography of Brookes More, and also of Maurice W. Parker, Sr. Parker was much admired by Brewer and his wife, and served as their voice coach (for poetry readings and lectures). Parker was highly regarded in the Boston area as a teacher of voice and music, and considered by Brewer to be the best dramatic coach in Boston and invaluable at bringing out the best in his students. He was also a landscape painter, violin maker, and a champion rifle shot and billiard player. Professor Kenneth Murdock, head of American literature at Harvard, ordered a number of copies of Brewer's book on Parker as an excellent example for his students on how to write a biography.

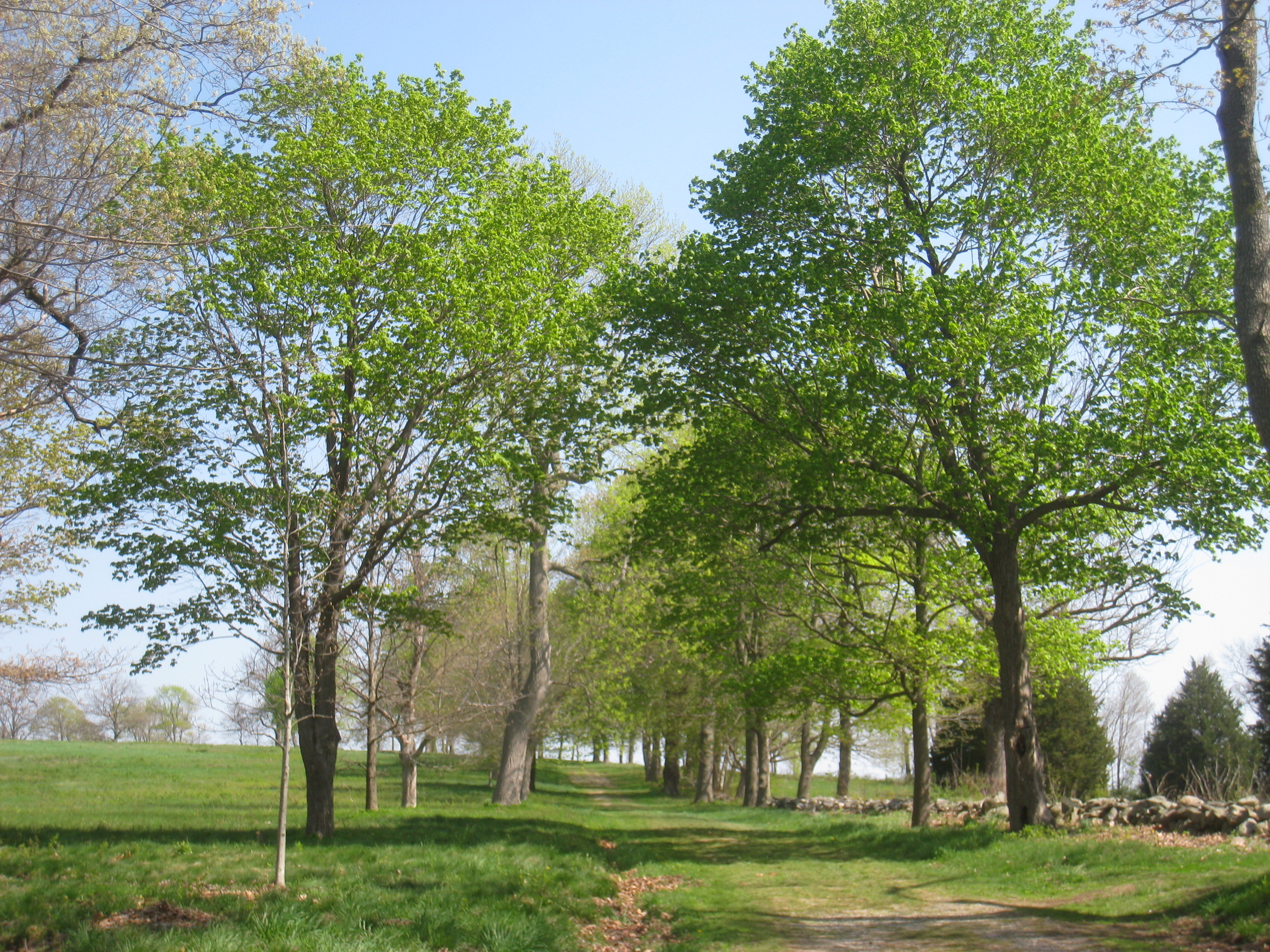
World's End, Hingham, MA.

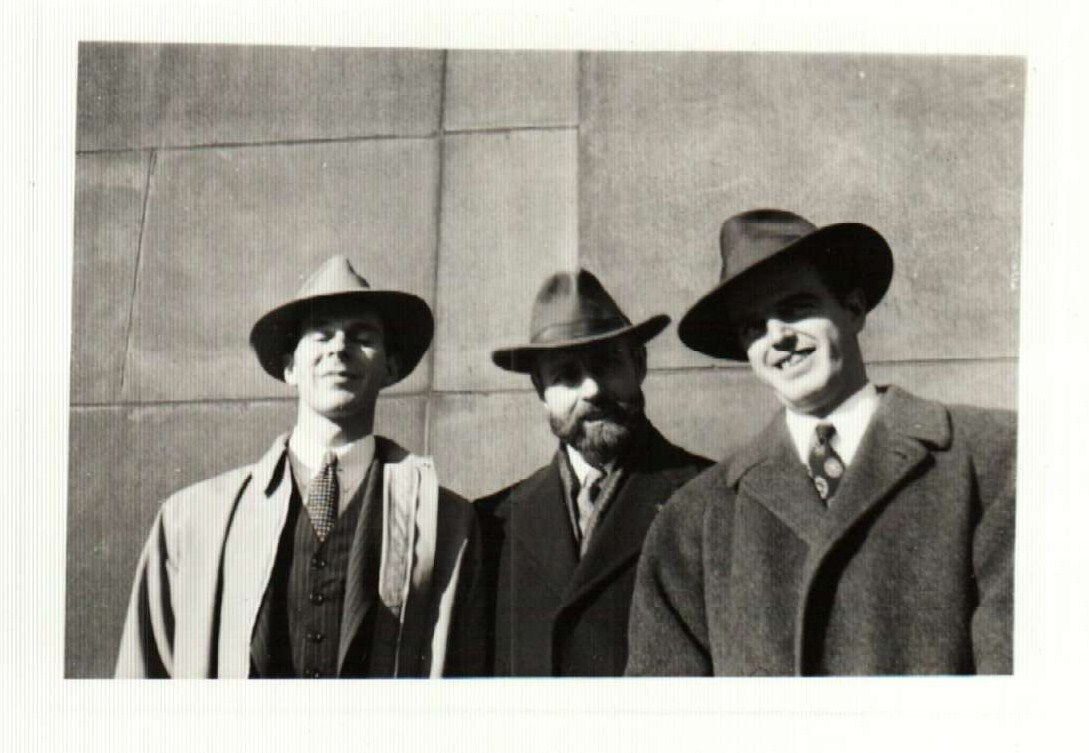
Nathan O. Parker, Wilmon Brewer and Philip B. Parker, Sr. Nathan and Philip Parker were sons of Brewer's close friend, Maurice W. Parker, Sr.

At the age of 90, Brewer published his autobiography, Looking Backwards. Brewer and his wife were adventurous world travelers throughout their lives and an extensive diary of their trips is included in the autobiography.

Brewer's books include:

- Shakespeare's Influence on Sir Walter Scott, 1925
- Dante's Eclogues, 1927
- Sonnets and Sestinas, 1937
- Life and Poems of Brookes More, 1940, 2nd edition 1980
- About Poetry and Other Matters, 1943
- Adventures in Verse, 1945, 2nd edition 2005
- Talks About Poetry, 1948
- New Adventures, 1950
- A Life of Maurice Parker, 1954
- Adventures Further, 1958
- Still More Adventures, 1966
- Ovid's Metamorphoses in European Culture, 1978
- Concerning the Art of Poetry, 1979
- Latest Adventures, 1981
- Looking Backwards, 1985

== Philanthropy ==
Brewer and his wife were generous philanthropists. An early example of this is that at the age of 25, Brewer gave "The Old Ordinary," (a historic tavern and home, built in 1686), to the Hingham Historical Society in memory of his father. The Society has held seasonal tours of the building since 1922. They also donated 300 acres of their Great Hill estate to the town of Hingham, which is now More-Brewer Park. Their generosity made the purchase of World's End possible for use as a public park. World's End is a 251-acre wooded peninsula in Boston Harbor, which had been in the Brewer family since the 1880s. Wilmon Brewer was a dedicated supporter of the Hingham Public Library and served as a trustee from 1938 until 1985.
