= Hingham Bay =

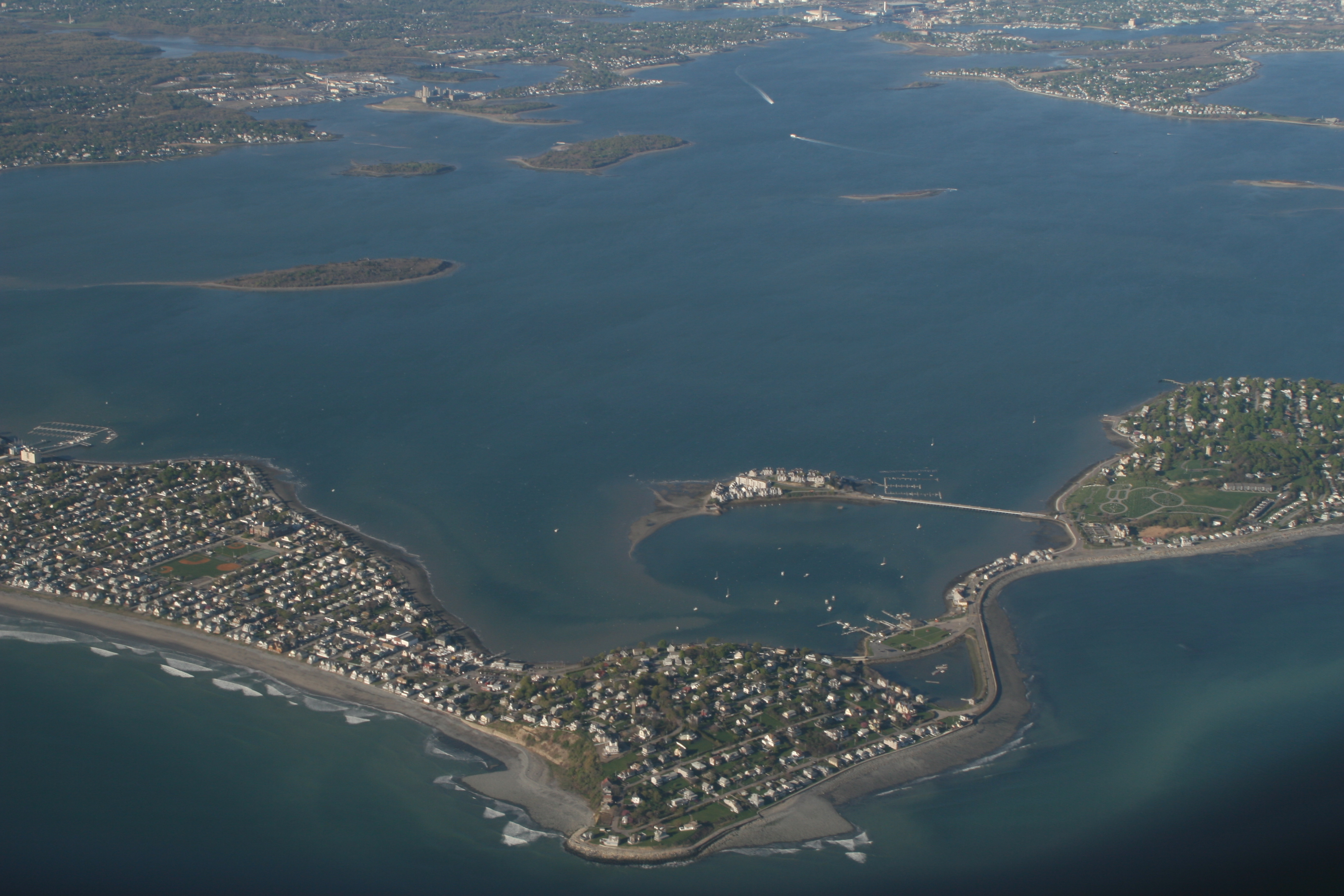
- Aerial view looking southwest with the town of Hull in the foreground

- Southern part of Boston Harbor showing Dorchester, Quincy and Hingham Bays

- Location within Massachusetts
- Location: Massachusetts, United States
- Coordinates: 42.28°N 70.92°W
- Type: Bay

Hingham Bay is the easternmost of the three small bays of outer Boston Harbor, part of Massachusetts Bay and forming the western shoreline of the town of Hull and the northern shoreline of Hingham in the United States state of Massachusetts. It lies east of Quincy Bay and is met at the southwest by the mouth of Weymouth Fore River, also forming part of the waterfront of Weymouth. The bay is home to several of the Boston Harbor Islands.

== Description ==
The bay is roughly 3 miles (4.8 km) wide east to west and 4 miles (6.4 km) long south to north. It is nearly enclosed on all sides, surrounded by peninsulas, former islands joined to the mainland, and Peddocks Island. There are two passages to Nantasket Roads and the Atlantic Ocean, one a 1,300-foot (400 m) opening at Hull Gut between Peddocks Island and Windmill Point in the northwest and a 0.5-mile (0.80 km) passage at West Gut between the island and Hough's Neck at Nut Island, part of the city of Quincy. Along the western portion of Hingham Bay a 300-foot (91 m) wide, 35-foot (11 m) deep channel allows oceangoing ships access from Hull Gut to Weymouth Fore River. To the north and east the bay is bordered by the town of Hull, where the contiguous water reaching the Hull shore is also known as Hull Bay. On the south, moving west, Hingham Bay is fed by three estuaries: Weir River between Hull and Hingham, Weymouth Back River between Hingham and Weymouth, and Weymouth Fore River between Weymouth and Quincy.

Bumpkin Island (30 acres (120,000 m^{2})) in Hingham and Grape Island (54 acres (220,000 m^{2})) in Weymouth, along with the smaller Slate Island and Sheep Island, are part of the Boston Harbor Islands National Recreation Area. Spinnaker Island in the north is attached to Hull by a low bridge. Other islands under 5 acres (20,000 m^{2}) in size that are associated with the bay include Button, Langlee, Ragged and Sarah Islands, all in Hingham Harbor. The southeast part of the bay is separated from Weir River estuary by World's End, a peninsular park owned by The Trustees of Reservations.

== History ==
Boston Harbor and its smaller sections such as Hingham Bay are characterized by geography created through Quaternary glaciations. During the last 100,000 years two glacial periods shaped the typical topography of the area through creation of drumlins and moraines followed by marine incursion flooding the low levels as the glaciers receded. This geological activity accounts for the variety of necks, peninsulas and islands in the harbor. The native Massachusett and antecedent tribes populated the islands of Hingham Bay as early as 8,000 years before the present, taking advantage of a rich marine ecology which featured shellfish, fishing and wild flora. The natives were first encountered in 1621 during the colonization of the Atlantic seaboard by settlers from England in the 17th century. Native Americans were removed from the islands and Hingham Bay area as a result of King Philip's War in 1675, while fishing continued to be a main activity of the colonists.

Military posts were established on Peddocks Island and Fort Revere at the strategically important Hull Gut entrance to Hingham Bay beginning in the American Revolution. Ships and submarines were produced at Fore River Shipyard located on Weymouth Fore River near where the river enters Hingham Bay beginning in the early 20th century. During World War II, hundreds of ships produced for the United States Navy at Fore River Shipyard and the associated Bethlehem-Hingham Shipyard in Hingham first entered the Atlantic at Hingham Bay.

Following the war, the list of possible locations for United Nations Headquarters included the unused land at World's End on Hingham Bay. The land was also later considered as a location for a nuclear power plant that was eventually built in Plymouth. The protection of Hingham Bay has been assisted by the establishment of the Boston Harbor Islands National Recreation Area in 1996 and the establishment of the Weir River Estuary Park Committee by the towns of Cohasset, Hingham and Hull in 2002.

== Trivia ==
In response to the second Trump administration's 2025 executive order to change the name of the Gulf of Mexico to the "Gulf of America," the mayor of Weymouth satirically announced that he had renamed Hingham Bay the "Gulf of Weymouth" via executive order.
