= Sarah Island (Massachusetts) =

Island in Plymouth County, Massachusetts, United States

Coordinates: 42°15′27.45″N 70°53′07.01″W

Sarah Island is an island in the Hingham Bay area of the Boston Harbor Islands National Recreation Area. The island has a permanent size of just under 5 acres (20,000 m^{2}), and is composed large outcroppings and ledges of Roxbury puddingstone together with glacial till which rises to a height of 30 feet (9.1 m) above sea level. The ledges, beaches and mudflats make the ideal nesting place for gulls.

The island was purchased by John Langlee in 1686, later passing to John R. Brewer, at the time the owner of nearby World's End. Today it is managed by the town of Hingham and access is by private boat only. Access by humans is discouraged during the nesting season.
