= Midwest Manufacturing Company =

Midwest Manufacturing Company was a manufacturer of refrigerators and steel kitchen cabinets in the 1930s and 1940s.

== Origin ==
S. S. “Stu” Battles was chief engineer of Ingersoll Steel Company in Chicago. He and Clarence Bullock, a salesman who called on Ingersoll, formed Midwest Enameling & Stamping Company to manufacture refrigerators. In 1934, they purchased an empty plant in Morrison, IL from Illinois Refrigeration Company, which had built wooden ice boxes.

== Growth ==
The company began providing electric refrigerators to Eureka-Williams Company in Bloomington, IL in early 1935. Later that year, the company moved to Galesburg, IL, completing the move in 1936 and changing its name to Midwest Manufacturing Company. During World War II, the company shifted from consumer goods to products such as mines, droppable gas tanks, powder cans and Navy floats. After the war, production of consumer refrigerators resumed and the company introduced Kitchen-Kraft steel kitchen cabinets, and the firm's all-steel kitchens enjoyed a degree of popularity in the “Atomic Age.” Midwest sold a franchise to manufacture and distribute the cabinets on the West Coast to Parker Manufacturing Company in Santa Monica, CA. Kitchen-Kraft steel cabinets were installed in the homes of various Hollywood movie stars/directors, such as Alan Ladd.

== Purchase ==
In 1950, Admiral Corporation purchased Midwest Manufacturing, with the latter becoming a wholly owned subsidiary, but retaining its name and corporate identity. By 1959, employment had grown from 500 to 2,000, with an annual payroll of over $8 million. Employment peaked at 3,300 in the early 1970s at Admiral’s Galesburg Appliance Division. The company merged with Rockwell International in 1974, and in 1986 Maytag took over the Galesburg plant. In 2004, the facility was closed and manufacturing operations shifted to other plants.
