= Bumpkin Island =

Tidal island in Massachusetts, United States of America

Coordinates: 42°16′52.00″N 70°53′59.20″W

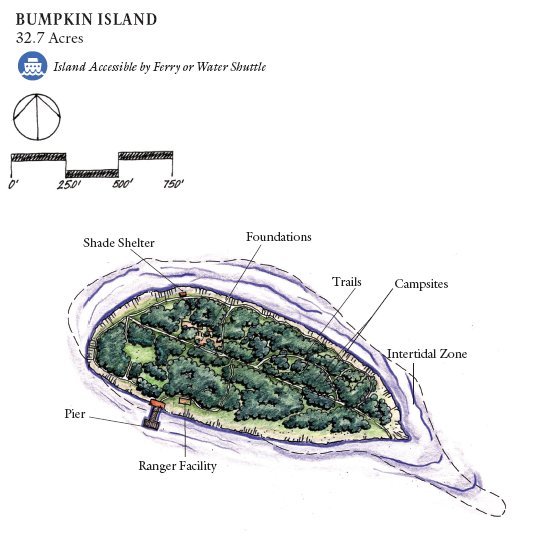
Map of Bumpkin Island, provided by the National Park Service

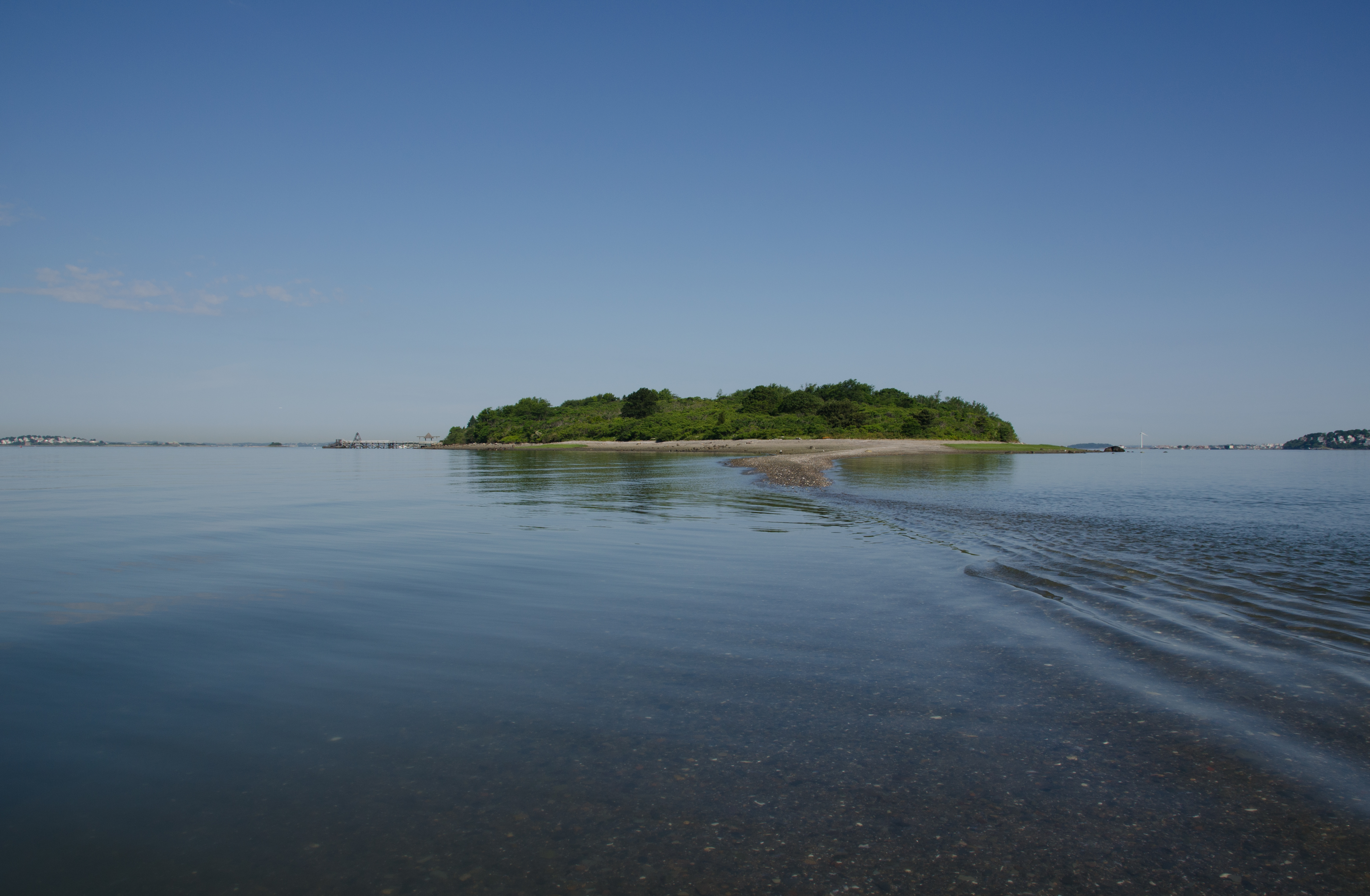
The island, seen from the sand spit, which connects it to Hull

Bumpkin Island, also known as Round Island, Bomkin Island, Bumkin Island, or Ward's Island, is an island in the Hingham Bay area of the Boston Harbor. Bumpkin Island is part of Boston Harbor Islands National and State Park. The island has an area of 30 acres (12 ha), plus an intertidal zone of a further 31 acres (13 ha). It is composed of a central drumlin with an elevation of 70 feet (21 m) above sea level, surrounded by a rock-strewn shoreline. A sand spit, exposed at low tide, connects the eastern end of the island to Sunset Point in Hull.

In 1902, Albert Burrage, a Boston philanthropist, had a summer hospital opened on the island for children with physical disabilities. During World War I the island was used by the U.S. Navy. Starting around 1940, the island was used as a facility for polio patients. However, the hospital closed during World War II and burned down in 1945.
