= Parker Manufacturing Company =

Parker Manufacturing Company was a machine shop during World War II that manufactured tools. It is also a manufacturer/distributor of metal kitchen cabinets and sinks, and an industrial landlord in Santa Monica, CA. The company designed and manufactured a unique sheet-metal shear (a large machine tool for cutting sheet steel) and was able to provide expedient delivery in only 30 days -- a huge advantage over other manufacturers who were taking around two years to make deliveries due to wartime production backlogs. It also designed and manufactured a unique sheet-metal press. Regarded as the most versatile press ever built, the Multi-Max press performed multiple operations (which previously had required multiple machines) in a compact amount of production-line space which was unprecedented.

== WWII era and machine tool builder ==
Parker Mfg. Co. began as a machine shop at 1746 Berkeley St., Santa Monica, CA producing items ranging from aircraft parts to precision fuses for bombs during World War II. What the company referred to as "precision" fuses may have been proximity fuses, which were a military secret that produced devastating effects on Japanese aircraft and German ground troops. Southern California was a major producer of aircraft during the war, and Santa Monica was headquarters for Douglas Aircraft Co. Douglas produced nearly 30,000 aircraft from 1942 to 1945.

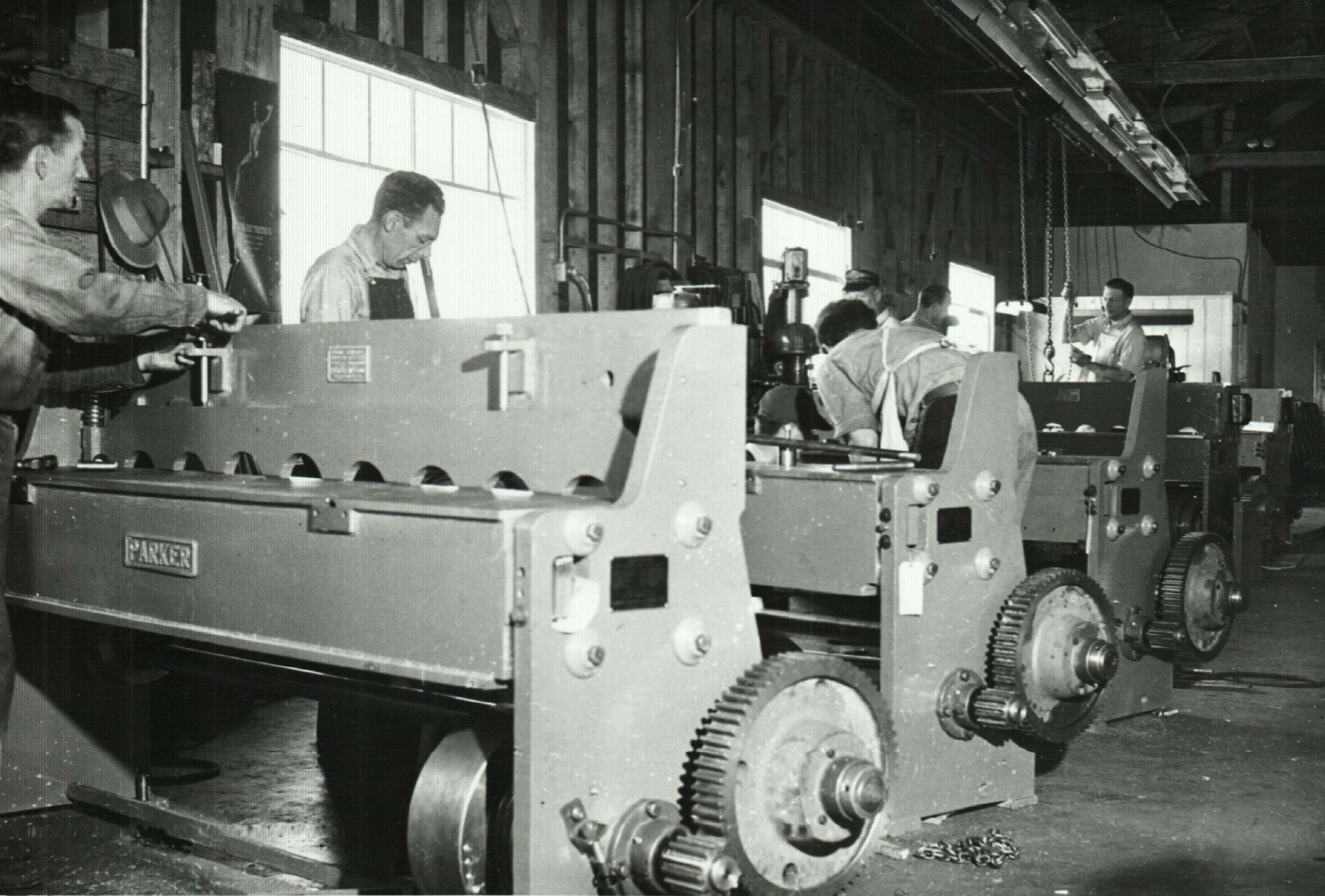
Parker Shears being manufactured.

When the war ended, Parker Mfg. Co. obtained a franchise to become the West Coast manufacturer and distributor of Kitchen-Kraft steel kitchen cabinets, a product of Midwest Mfg. Co., in Galesburg, IL. Company President M. Wesley Parker, Jr. made an arrangement with S. S. Battles, the president of Midwest Mfg. Co., for Nathan O. Parker (M. Wesley Parker, Jr.'s brother), to come work for Midwest Mfg. Co. temporarily in preparation for this venture. Nathan Parker worked there for something less than a year in 1946, in a variety of positions to learn about all aspects of the operation, ranging from cutting steel to painting cabinets to accounting. He then came to the West Coast to help set up cabinet-making operations there for Parker Mfg. Co., and served as its secretary-treasurer and as a director.

In order to produce the cabinets, Parker Mfg. Co. needed a sheet-metal shear and a press. Due to the war, machine tool manufacturers were backed up with orders so far that two-year delivery times were not uncommon.

However, the company had Harold Verson, who had been chief engineer in his family's machine-tool manufacturing business in Chicago. He proposed that they design and build their own shear, which they then did.

The machine was a success. M. Wesley Parker, Jr. showed it off to the owner of another shop, who was impressed, and made him an offer to buy the machine. Parker Mfg. Co. sold it to him, and then made two more. The company sold those, too. It then made six more, and sold those. Thus, it entered the shear-manufacturing business.

Views of the shop floor, 1946.

The company was unable to obtain castings for the shears due to the fact that all the foundries were backlogged with orders, just as the machine tool manufacturers were. So, the Parker Shears were built entirely out of steel plate – no castings at all.

In 1947, the company introduced the Multi-Max Press (which was also made entirely out of steel plate). Verson designed this machine, which would perform multiple operations on sheet metal (e.g., shearing, notching, punching, bending and forming). These processes would have normally required three separate machine tools (a shear, a press brake and a press).

The Multi-Max Press was also compact, did not require a special foundation, and could be moved easily in and out of a production line for efficient workflow.

Customers ranged from small firms to large manufacturers, both domestically and abroad, including O'Keefe & Merritt, Baldwin Piano Co., Burroughs Adding Machine Co., Gillig Bros., and Toledo Desk & Fixture Co.

As the post-war economy gradually got back to normal in the late 1940s, the lead times for machine tools began to shrink. To compete effectively with the big machine tool manufacturers, Parker Mfg. Co. would have to dramatically expand.

The company also experienced labor unrest. The workers wanted to unionize and demanded a significant pay increase. The company was already paying the highest wages in the area, and President Parker asked the labor leaders for some time to think it over. Within 30 days, the company sold the operation. The engineering and inventory were purchased by Diamond Machine Tool Co. in Pico Rivera, CA.

== Cabinet manufacturer and industrial landlord ==
At this point, the company returned its focus to getting into the kitchen cabinet business as originally planned. The company had acquired a six-acre parcel of vacant land from the Southern Pacific Co. within the area bordered by Colorado Ave., Cloverfield Blvd., Olympic Blvd., Pacific Electric Ry. and 20th Street in Santa Monica. It built its first building on the property in 1946 and moved its machine shop operations there from the Berkeley St. location.

Over the next decade, it built five more buildings on the property and a rail spur. Eventually thirteen buildings and additions were constructed. Most of these were built to lease to industrial tenants.

Admiral Corporation took over Midwest Mfg. Co.'s facilities in Galesburg in 1950, with Midwest becoming a wholly owned subsidiary of Admiral, but retaining its name and corporate identity. A few years later its focus shifted away from Kitchen-Kraft cabinets, and S. S. Battles asked M. Wesley Parker, Jr. if he could get by without the product. By this time, Parker Mfg. Co. had enough buildings and tenants that the answer was yes. The company got out of the manufacturing business and was solely an industrial landlord thereafter.

Tenants included L&B Mfg. Co., which manufactured and imported restaurant booths, chairs and equipment, Seeco, Inc., a machine shop, Woodland Furniture Mfg. Co., Inc., a furniture manufacturer, Precision Forge Co., a manufacturer of steel forgings, General Telephone Corp., Telic Corporation, a manufacturer of electronic chips used in calculators, and various others.

Over the years, Parker Mfg. Co. made other investments, such as purchasing an industrial building in West Los Angeles, which was leased to the Postal Service for mail storage. The company also invested in vacant land, and participated as an investor in drilling wildcat oil wells. None of the wells struck oil, but the other properties were sold at a profit.

As time went by, the land value of the Santa Monica property went up to the point where industrial buildings were no longer the best use for the land. M. Wesley Parker, Jr., the principle stockholder in the company, was aging, and the next generation of family members had no particular interest in running the company. So, it was decided to sell the property and liquidate the corporation.

The industrial buildings on Parker Mfg. Co's. six-acre site have now all been replaced by up-scale, multi-story office buildings. The Douglas Aircraft plant also no longer exists in Santa Monica, and the company itself has been absorbed by Boeing. Most of the manufacturing tenants of Parker Mfg. Co. no longer exist as business entities, and the railroad line is gone.

One of the first Parker Shears made (serial #108) is at the Orange Empire Railway Museum at Perris, CA. The machine has been rebuilt (with a new clutch) and is in use in the museum's shops.
