= World's End (Hingham) =

Peninsula in Hingham, Massachusetts, just south of Boston

- World's End Reservation
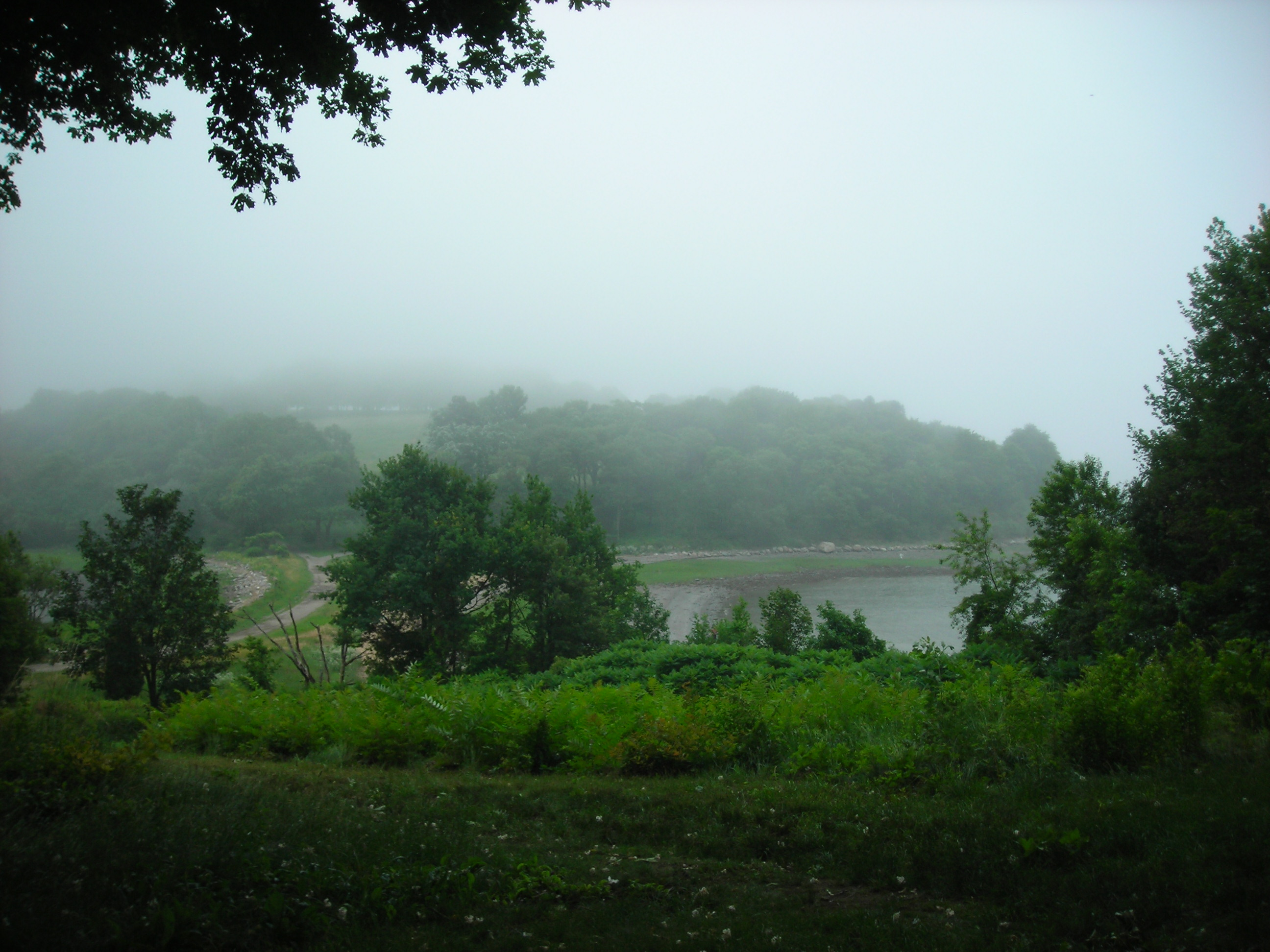
- World's End on a foggy summer day

- Location within Massachusetts Location within the United States
- Location: Plymouth County, Massachusetts
- Nearest city: Hingham, Massachusetts
- Coordinates: 42.27°N 70.88°W
- Area: 251 acres (102 ha)
- Established: 1967
- Governing body: The Trustees of Reservations

World's End is a 251-acre (102 ha) park and conservation area located on a peninsula in Hingham, Massachusetts. The peninsula is bordered by the Weir River to the North and East and Hingham Harbor (part of Hingham Bay, and Boston Harbor) to the West. The land is composed of four drumlins (Pine Hill, Planter's Hill, and the double drumlins of World's End proper) harboring tree groves interspersed with fields attractive to butterflies and grassland-nesting birds, and offers 4.5 miles (7.2 km) of walking paths with views of the Boston skyline.

The adjacent neighborhood, an upper-middle class residential subdivision with several waterfront homes, is also colloquially called World's End.

== History ==
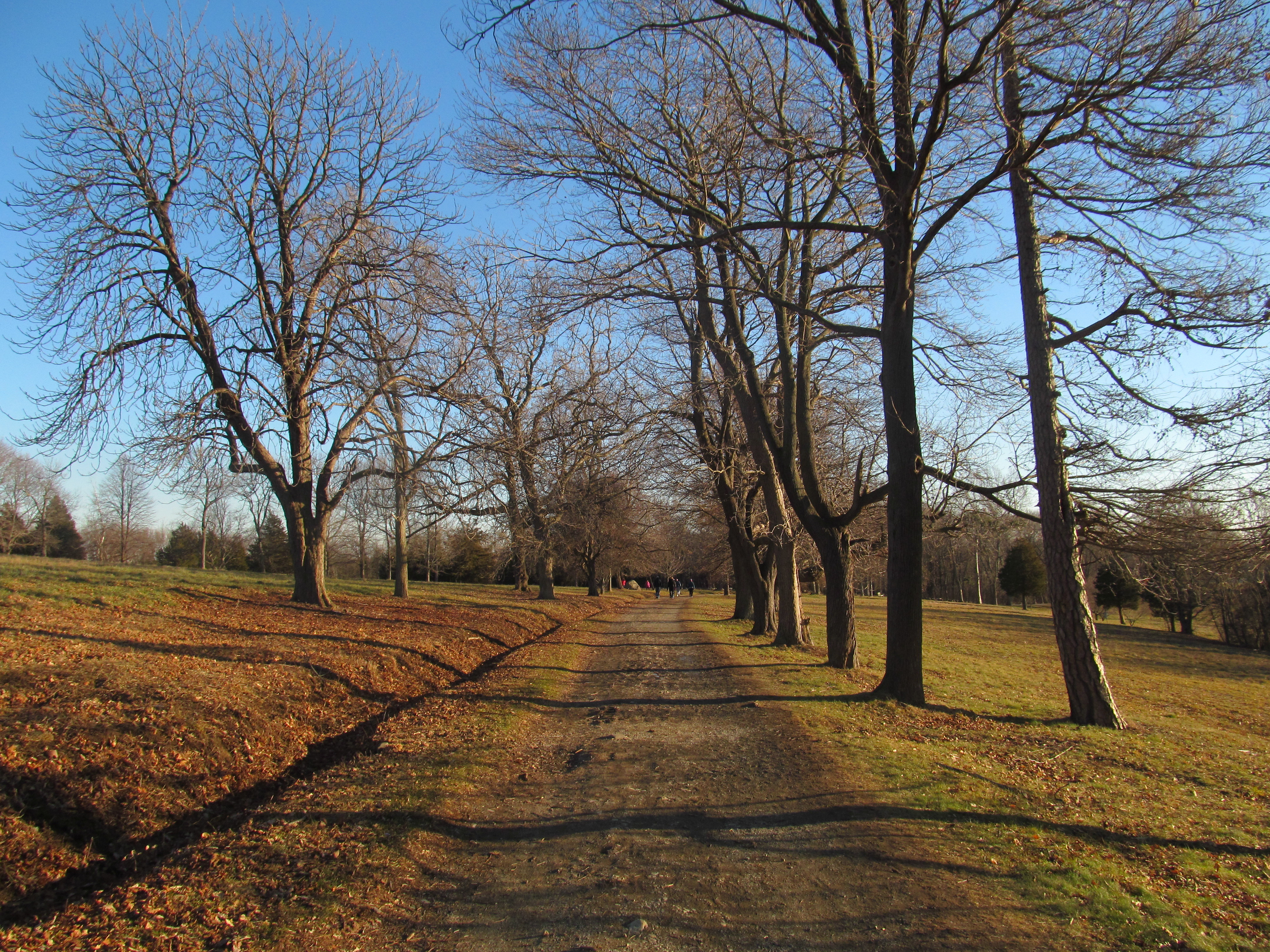
Brewer Road at World's End

In the 1855, the peninsula was purchased and turned into an extensive estate by John Brewer, who raised livestock there. In 1886, Brewer commissioned noted landscape architect Frederick Law Olmsted to design a residential subdivision. The design was made and the roads and trees set in place, but the homes were never built.

The site was proposed in 1945 as a location for the nascent United Nations, but New York City was chosen instead. In the mid 1960s, Boston Edison considered building a nuclear power plant on World's End, but instead built the Pilgrim Nuclear Generating Station 25 miles (40 km) to the south.

In 1967, through the generosity of Wilmon Brewer, the northern two-thirds of the World's End peninsula was acquired by the Trustees of Reservations and opened for public use. In 1996, it was made part of the Boston Harbor Islands National Recreation Area, but the Trustees continue to manage the site.

The short story "World's End" by Clare Beams is inspired by Olmsted's dealings with the landscape, although the role of architect is played by a younger, unnamed person.
