= Magnifique =

Magnifique may refer to:

- French ship Magnifique, 1814
- Magnifique-class ship of the line
  - French ship Magnifique (1749)
- Magnifique (album), an album by Ratatat
