= Broad Sound Channel Inner Range Lights =

Lighthouse in Boston, Massachusetts, U.S.

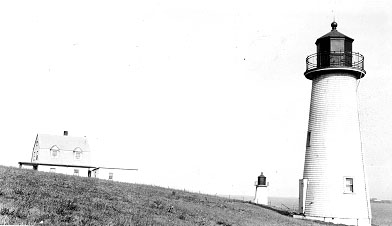
- the lights sometime after 1913, with the rear light in the foreground (USCG)
- Location: Spectacle Island in Boston Harbor
- Coordinates: 42°19′40″N 70°59′03″W (front); 42°19′39″N 70°59′07″W (rear)

Tower
- Constructed: 1903
- Construction: Wood
- Shape: Conical tower
- Markings: initially red; changed to white

Light
- Deactivated: around 1950
- Focal height: 53 ft (16 m) (front); 70 ft (21 m) (rear)
- Lens: fourth order Fresnel lens

The Broad Sound Channel Inner Range Lights were a pair of lighthouses in Boston Harbor. They were removed around 1950 when the channel they helped to mark was superseded by a parallel channel to the north.

== History ==
The range marked by these lights formed part of a three-leg channel leading from the ocean. Prior to dredging there were two main routes: a southern route past Boston Light and through the narrows south of Lovells Island, and a northern route entering from Broad Sound past Deer Island and across President Roads. The outermost leg of this latter route, the Broad Sound Channel, was divided into the North Channel and South Channel by a rise.

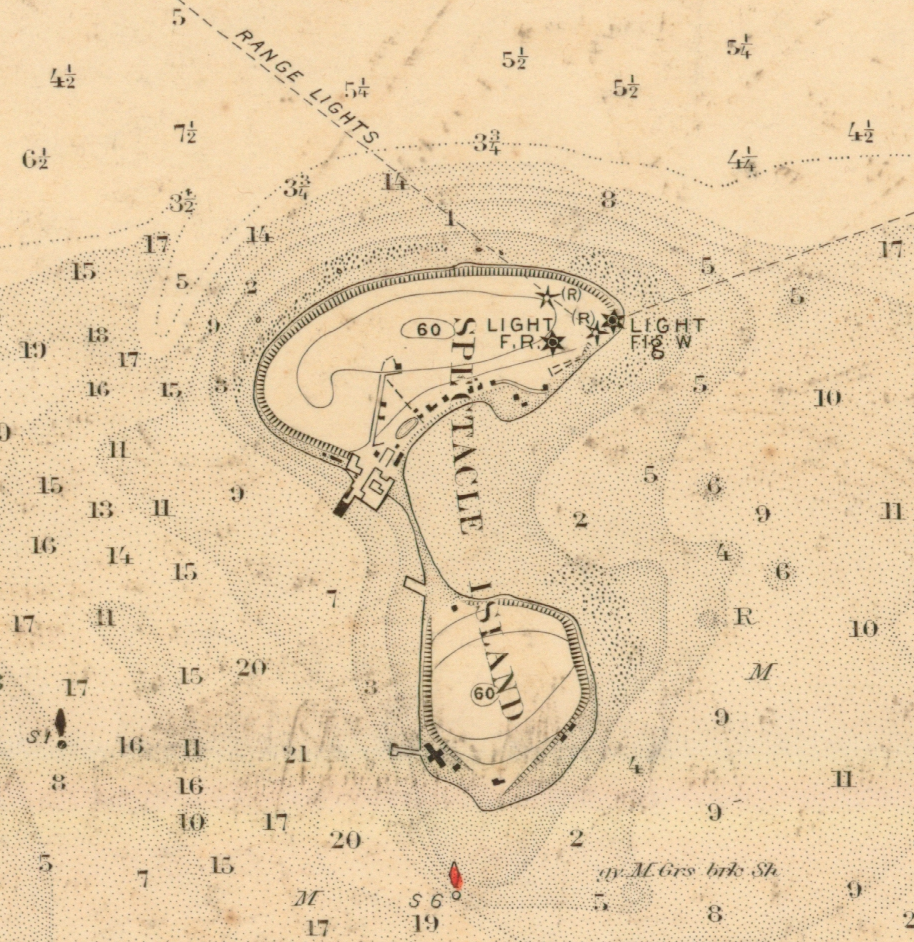
Spectacle Island in 1909, showing the Spectacle Island range with five-pointed stars and the Broad Sound Channel range with six-pointed stars

In 1897 the innermost leg of these routes was marked with the Spectacle Island Range Lights; the remainder of the northern route was marked in 1903, with the route through the South Channel indicated by the Lovells Island Range Lights, and the Broad Sound Channel Inner Range marking the turn to the west and across the south of President Roads. The last consisted of a pair of wooden, conical towers, also on the northern portion of Spectacle Island adjacent to the Spectacle Island range; both were equipped with fourth-order Fresnel lenses. A new frame keeper's house was built. Given the proximity of the two sets of lights, they were all tended by the same keeper, with the other house occupied by his assistant. The towers were red at first but were repainted white by the next year.

Unsurprisingly, with four lights in such a small area they were often confused with one another. By 1913 it was decided that the Spectacle Island range was unneeded, and notice was given of its discontinuance. This was met by complaints from shipping interests who mistakenly believed that the Broad Sound range was being removed. Removal proceeded and the 1903 lights were left standing alone.

By this time a new North Channel was being dredged, and it came to be the preferred route. Therefore, when Fort Standish was being rebuilt in 1939, the Lovells Island lights were removed, leaving the Broad Sound Channel lights as the only markers for any part of the old route other than buoys marking specific shoals. The lights were finally discontinued and removed around 1950. Fill from the Big Dig has been used to expand and raise the island, eliminating every trace of the old lights.
