= Spectacle Island (Massachusetts) =

Island in Massachusetts, USA

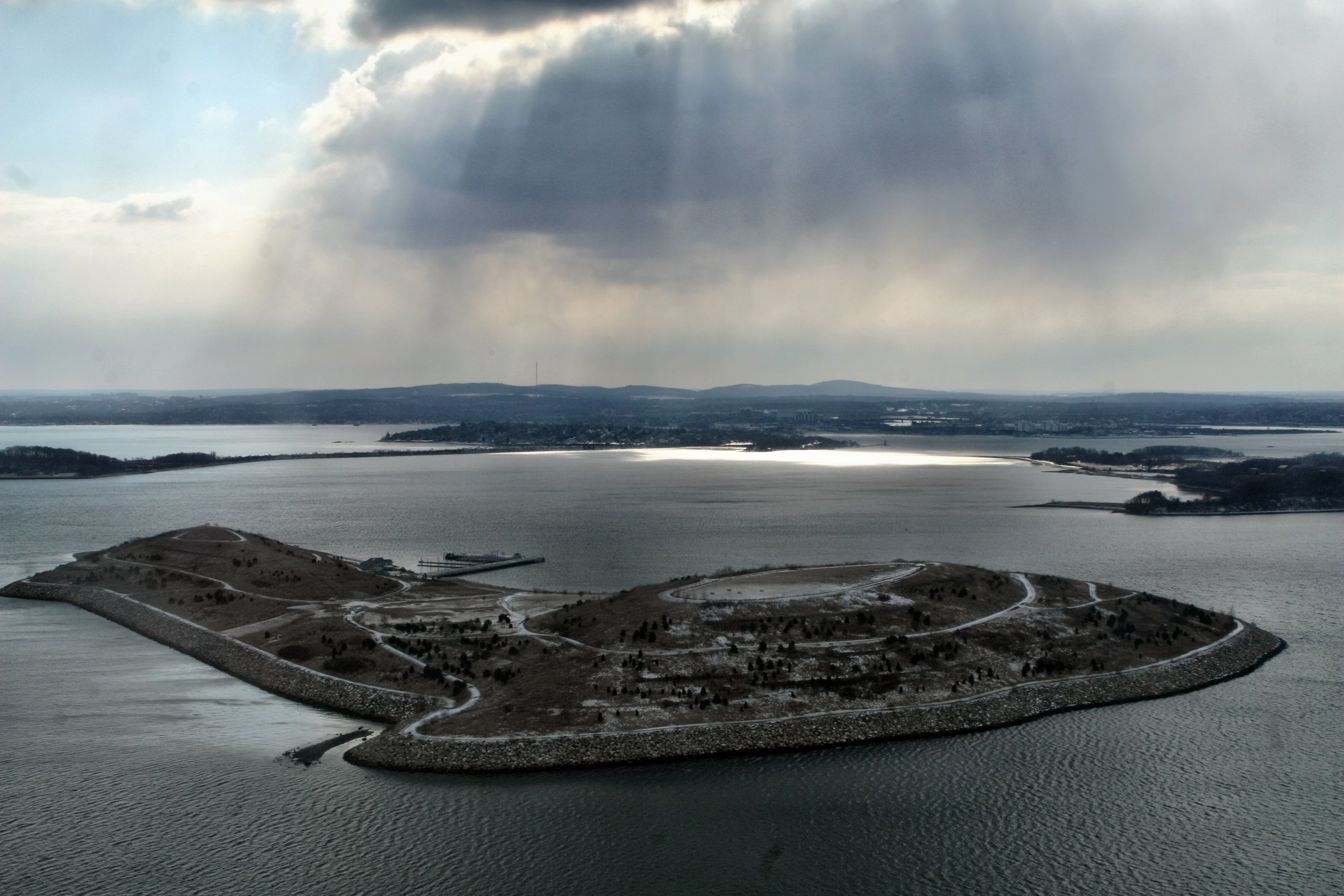
- Spectacle Island in 2007
- Interactive map of Spectacle Island

Geography
- Location: Boston Harbor
- Coordinates: 42°19′26″N 70°59′10″W
- Area: 0.46 km^{2} (0.18 sq mi)
- Highest elevation: 48 m (157 ft)

Administration
- United States

Demographics
- Population: 0

Additional information
- Time zone: Eastern Standard Time

Spectacle Island is a 114-acre (46 ha) island in Boston Harbor, 4 miles (6.4 km) offshore of downtown Boston, Massachusetts. It is part of the city of Boston. The island has a varied history, and today is a public park with a marina, visitor center, lifeguarded swimming beach, and five miles of walking trails, forming part of the Boston Harbor Islands National Recreation Area. It is served all year by ferries from Boston, and on weekends and summer weekdays by a shuttle boat to and from nearby islands.

== Topography ==
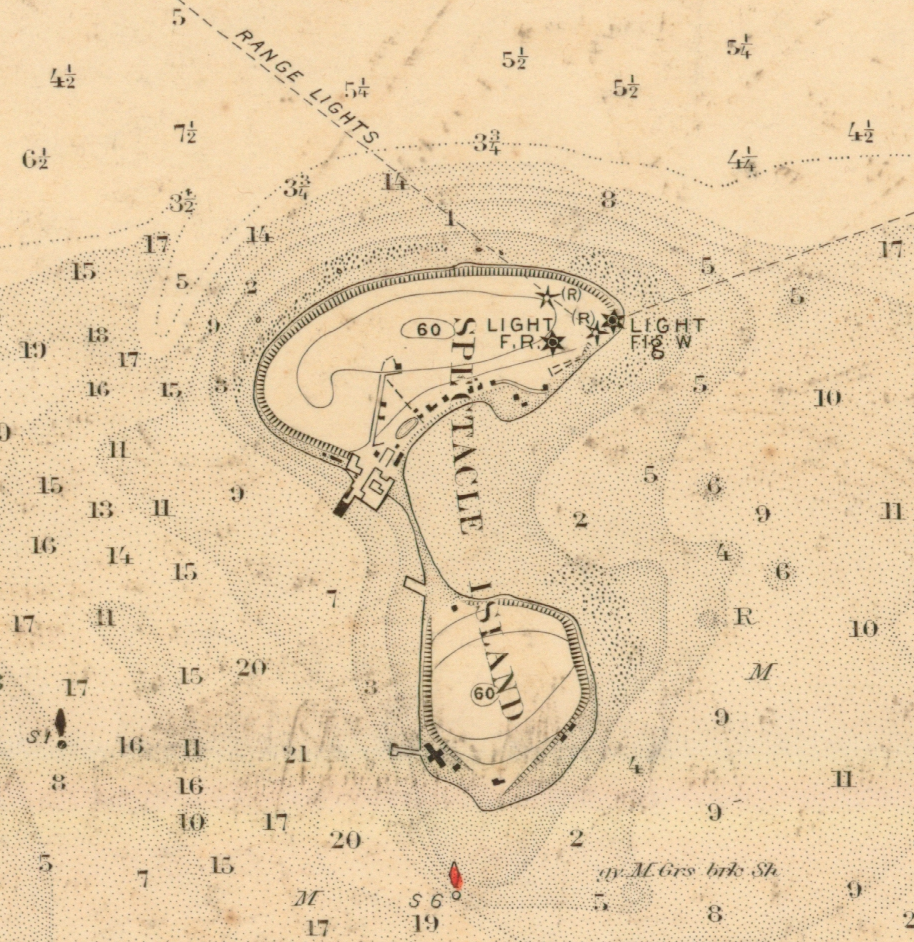
Spectacle Island in 1909

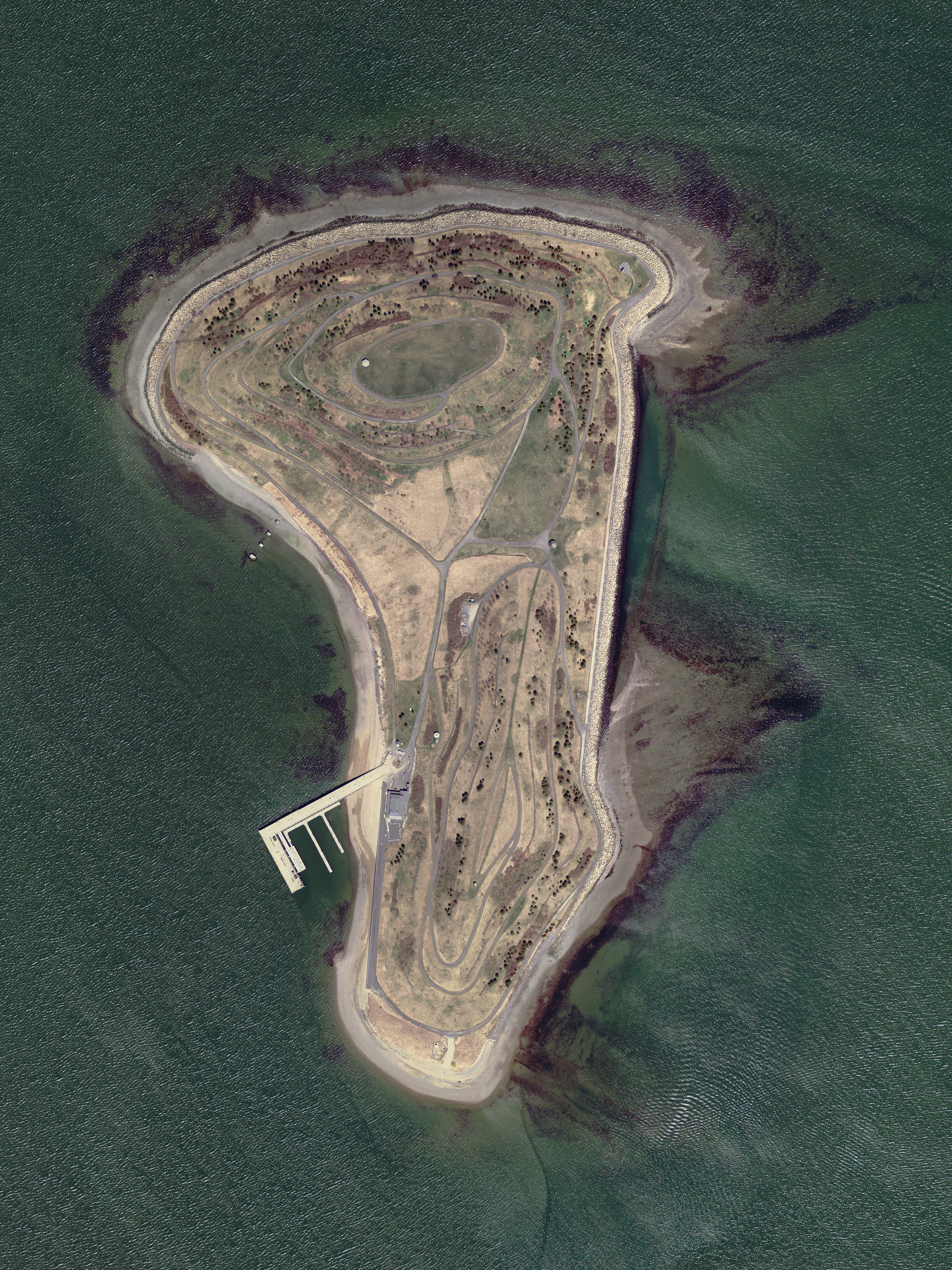
Spectacle Island in 2013

The island was initially composed of two small drumlins connected by a spit, with an approximate size of 49 acres (200,000 m^{2}). The name is believed to derive from its then-resemblance to a pair of spectacles. However, dumping of trash and dirt, together with subsequent landscaping, have resulted in a significantly larger island with a permanent size of 85 acres (340,000 m^{2}), plus an intertidal zone of a further 28 acres (110,000 m^{2}).

The island is now composed of two artificial earth mounds, terraced with retaining walls, roads and newly planted vegetation. With its tallest height above sea level being 157 feet (48 m), Spectacle Island is one of the highest points on Boston Harbor. The island's inner harbor acreage is 114 (46 ha), with 85.5 upland acres (34.6 ha) and 28.4 intertidal acres (11.5 ha).

== History ==
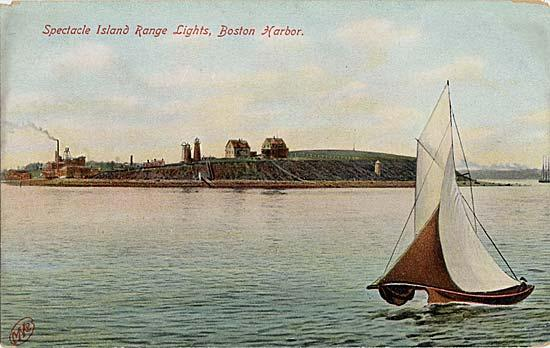
The island in 1907 showing the Spectacle Island Range Lights

During the 1770s Spectacle Island's freshwater springs were considered as an alternative to those chosen on Noddle's Island for the Royal Navy to purchase drinking water because Spectacle Island, 5 or 6 miles from where the fleet was moored would not be inaccessible to boats in winter because of ice and snow, wrote Rear Admiral John Montagu, Boston, May 26, 1772.

Starting in the early 19th century, the island was used exclusively for its relative remoteness from Boston. A horse rendering plant was built on Spectacle Island in 1857, followed by a city trash incinerator that remained active until 1935. When the incinerator closed, trash was simply dumped on the island for the next thirty years. A bulldozer was supposedly swallowed up by the trash sometime during the 1950s. The island remained a trash dump until the 1990s.

In September 1846, Spectacle Island became a pivotal location in the story of George, a freedom seeker escaping from slavery. George was discovered as a stowaway aboard the Ottoman, a ship from New Orleans, in Boston Harbor. Upon this discovery, Captain James Hannum of the Ottoman took George to Spectacle Island under guard. While Captain Hannum stopped at one of the island's hotels for a drink, George seized the opportunity to escape, stealing Hannum's small boat and headed towards South Boston. Captain Hannum quickly realized George's escape and pursued him by boat and on foot. After a two-mile (3 km) chase through cornfields and over fences, Hannum captured George just as he reached a bridge. This event sparked outrage within Boston's abolitionist community, leading to Hannum's arrest on charges of kidnapping. In a desperate bid to return George to enslavement, Captain Hannum transferred him to another ship bound for New Orleans, but abolitionists intercepted Hannum's vessel. Despite a tense confrontation at sea, George's fate remained uncertain.

The Pacific Guano Company, based in Boston, established its first plant in 1861, on Spectacle Island before moving it in 1863 to Woods Hole, Massachusetts.

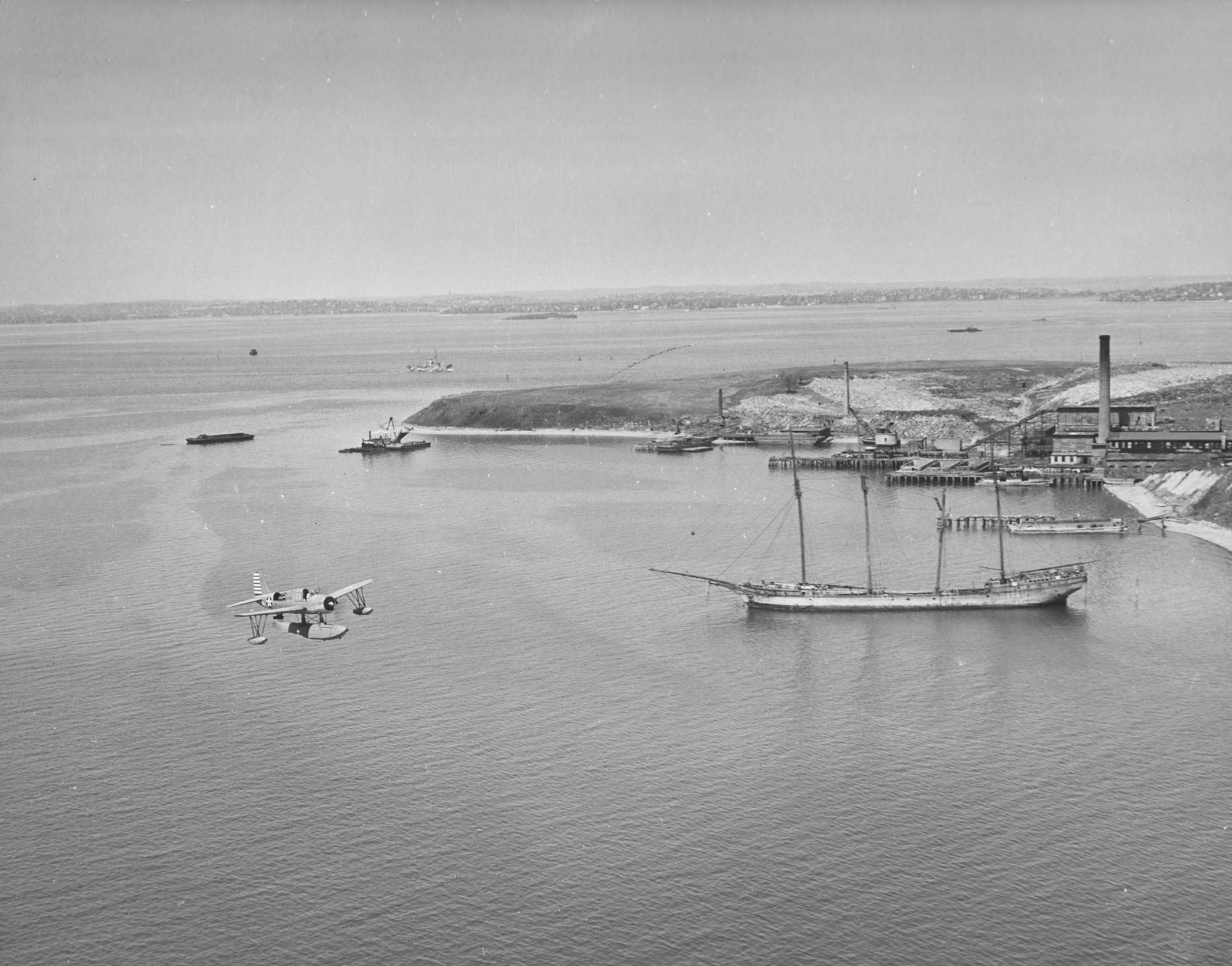
OS2U Kingfisher from NAS Squantum flying near Spectacle Island's Western shore, April–May 1942. Schooner Snetind off shore of island.

Two sets of range lights were erected on the island by the United States Lighthouse Service. The Spectacle Island Range Lights were established in 1897 to mark the last leg of the channel into Boston itself, past Governor's Island; they were not long-lived and were discontinued in 1913. The Broad Sound Channel Inner Range Lights were first lit in 1903 and discontinued around 1950; these indicated the middle leg of the trip. No trace of any of these lights remains.

When the Central Artery/Third Harbor Tunnel Project, or the Big Dig, began work in Boston in 1992, some of the project's excavated dirt and clay was used to resurface the island. The island was covered and built up by dirt, capped with two feet (0.6 m) of clay, and covered with two to five feet (0.6 to 1.5 m) of topsoil. The landscape design, completed by Brown, Richardson + Rowe, Inc., focused on providing a habitat and long-term erosion control for the island, including thousands of trees, shrubs, and meadow, wildflower, and native beach grasses. Crushed-stone paths circle the island, and the grass amphitheater provides views of the Boston skyline.

Spectacle Island opened to the public in June 2006 for use as a recreational area with hiking trails, a beach, a visitors' center, and a marina with 38 boat slips for visitors.

== Transportation ==
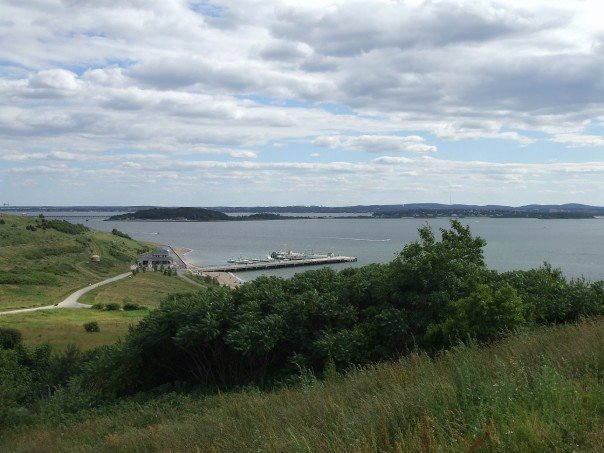
The marina on Spectacle Island in summer as viewed from one of the foot-trails from the North Summit. Thompson Island can be seen in the background.

Spectacle Island is accessible to the public either through a ferry from Long Wharf or to private watercraft at the island's marina. Ferries run from and to Boston as well as from and to Georges Island. The marina was closed for almost two years in the late 2010s due to repairs required as the result of a storm in the winter of 2015. As of July 2017, the marina is open and public moorings are available.

== Popular culture ==
- Spectacle Island is featured in the video game Fallout 4.
- The island, fictionalized as a pile of toxic waste and garbage, plays an important role in the novel Zodiac: An Eco-Thriller, by author Neal Stephenson.
- Spectacle Island is mentioned in the book The Speckled Monster by Jennifer Lee Carrell. It is described as a quarantine island used especially during the smallpox epidemic as a place for ships carrying disease to unload ill passengers.

== Images ==
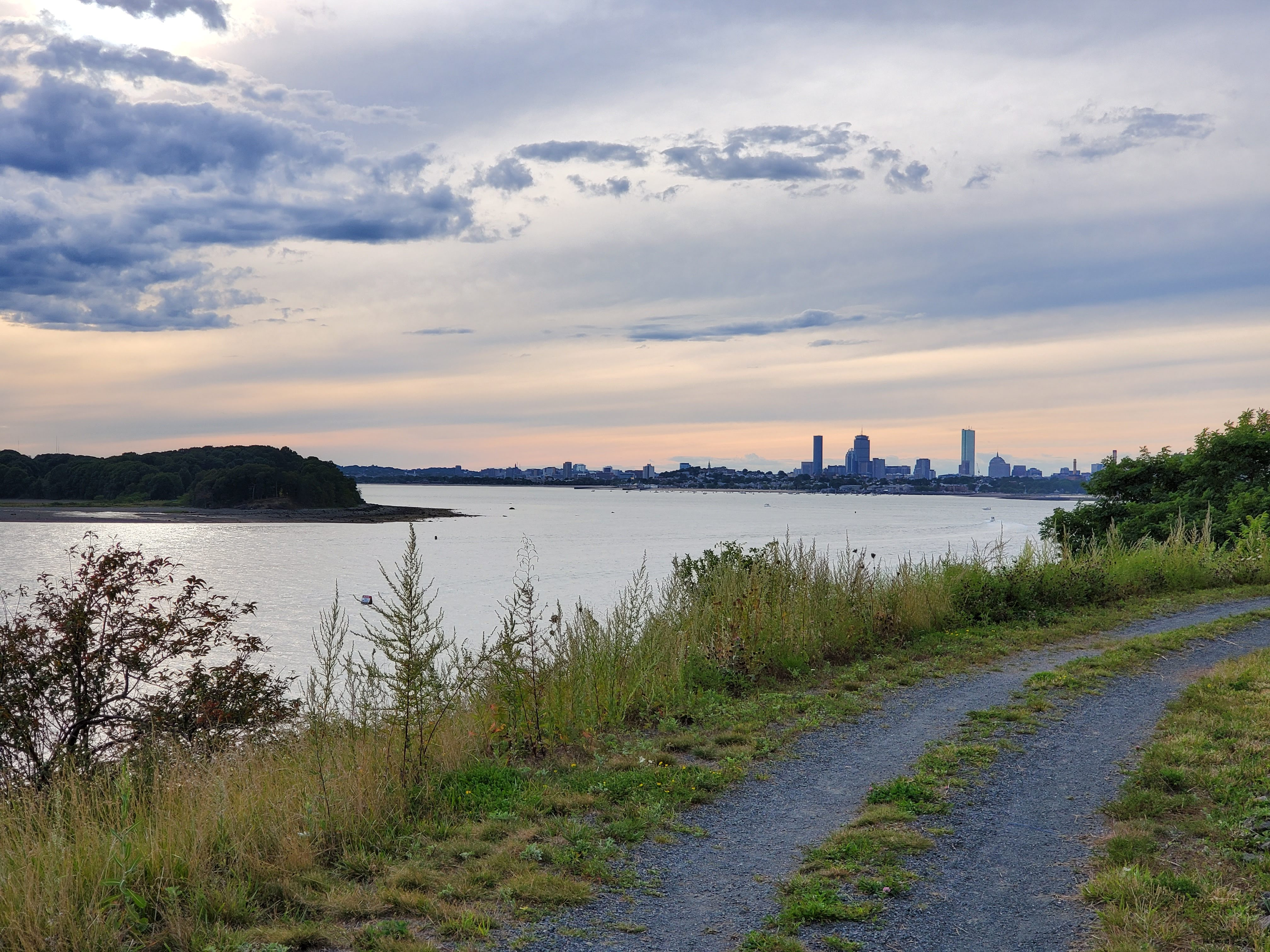
Shoreline trail with Boston skyline

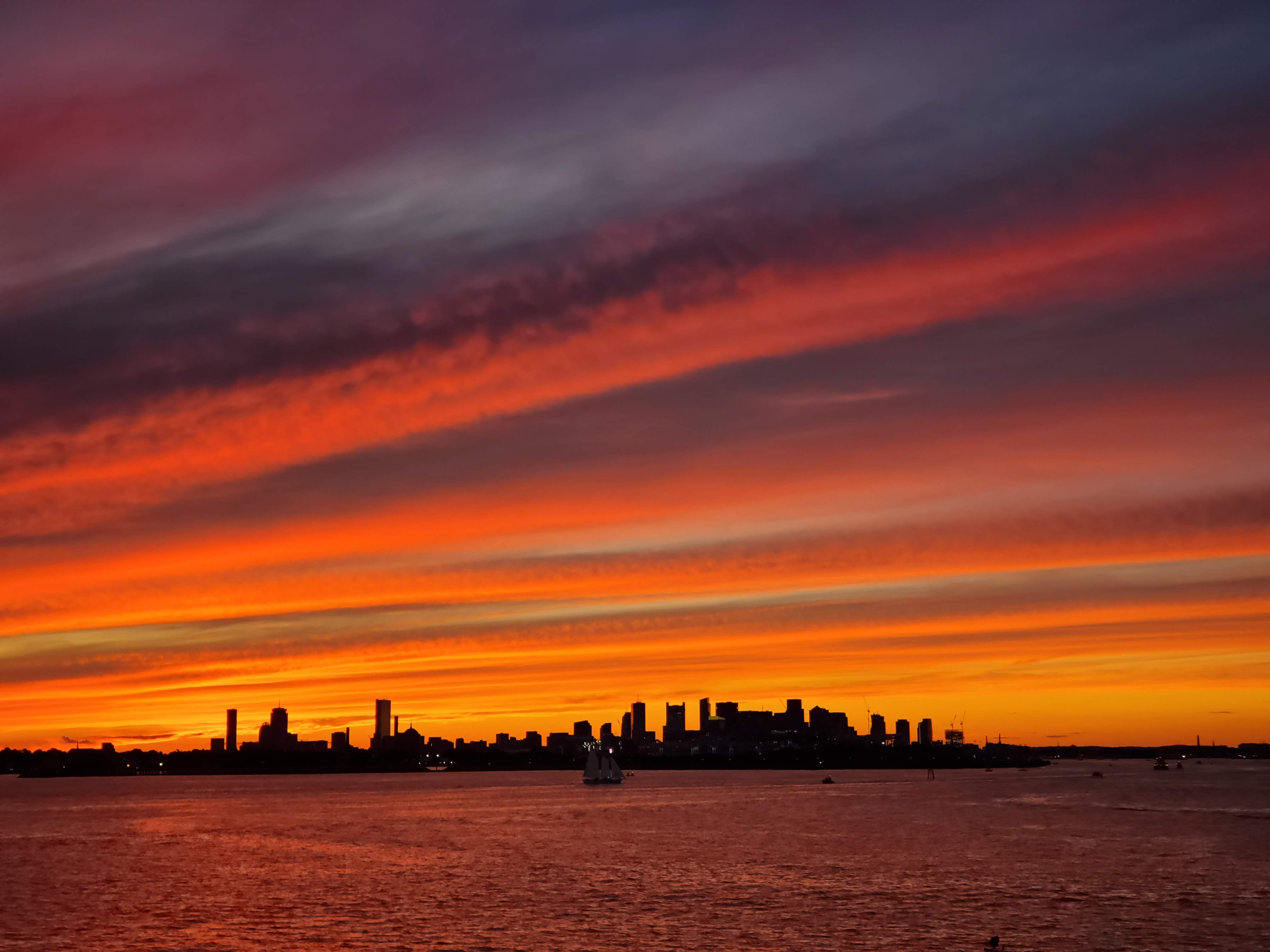
Boston skyline from Spectacle Island

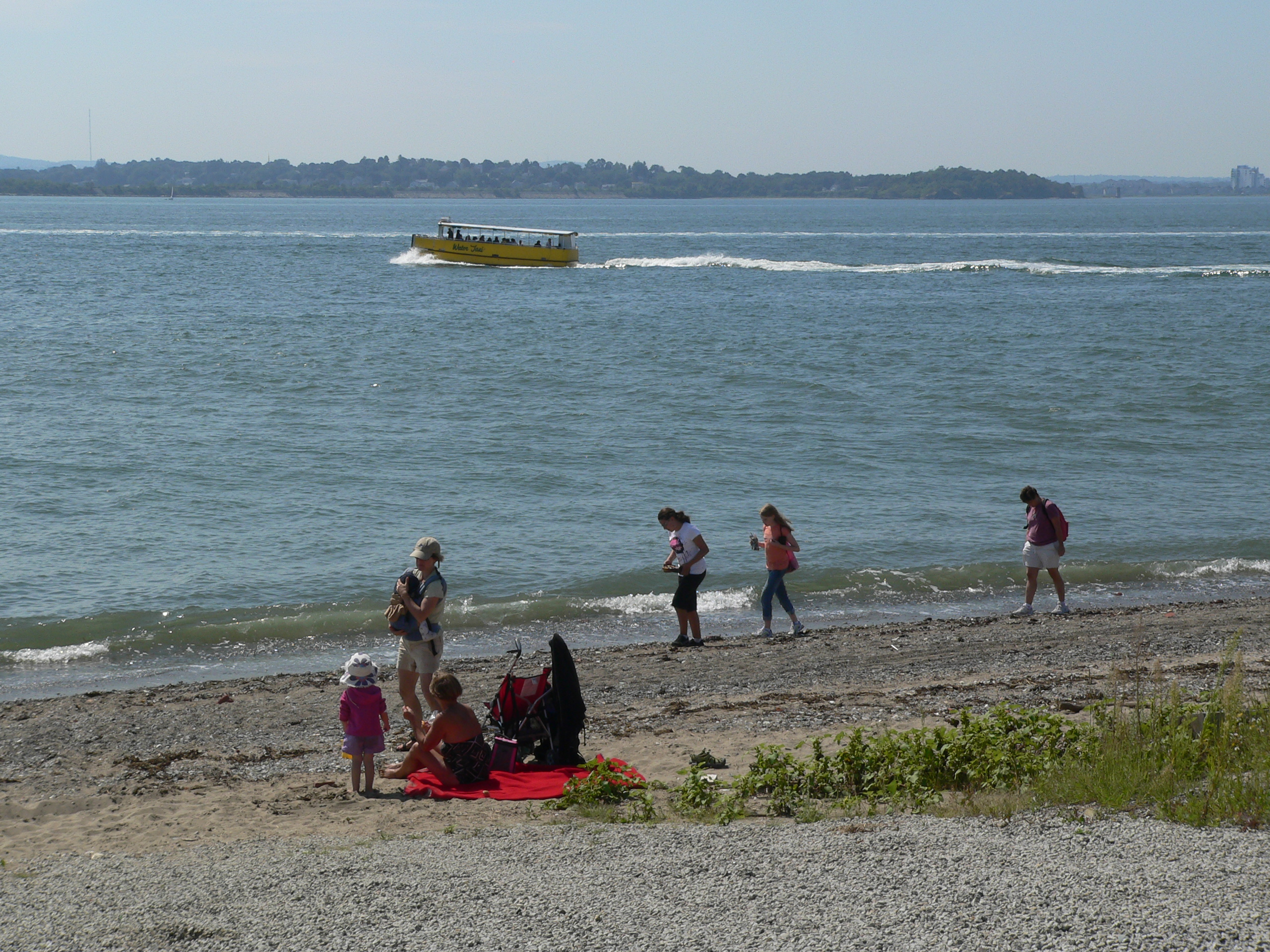
Visitors on the beach

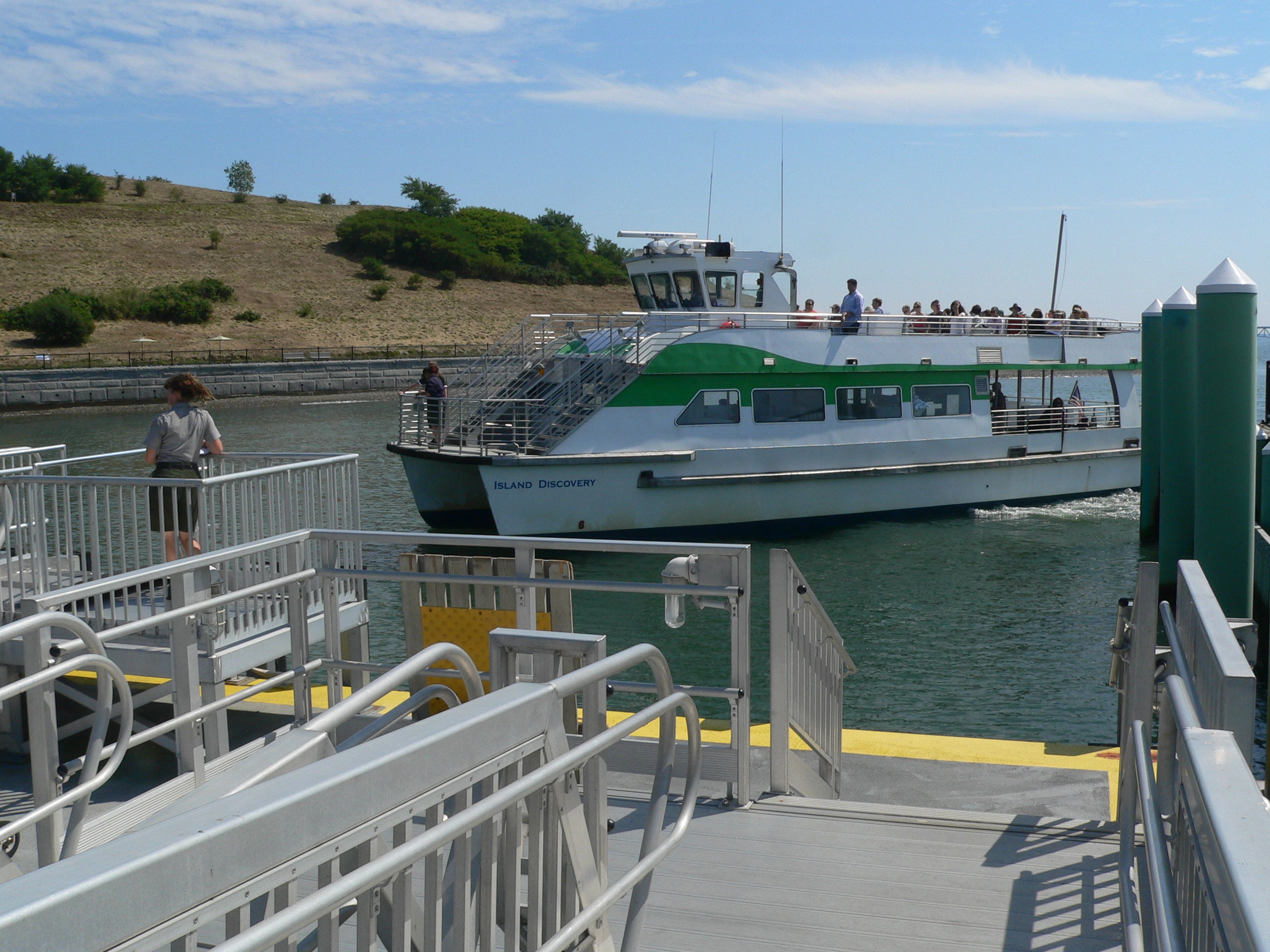
Ferry arriving

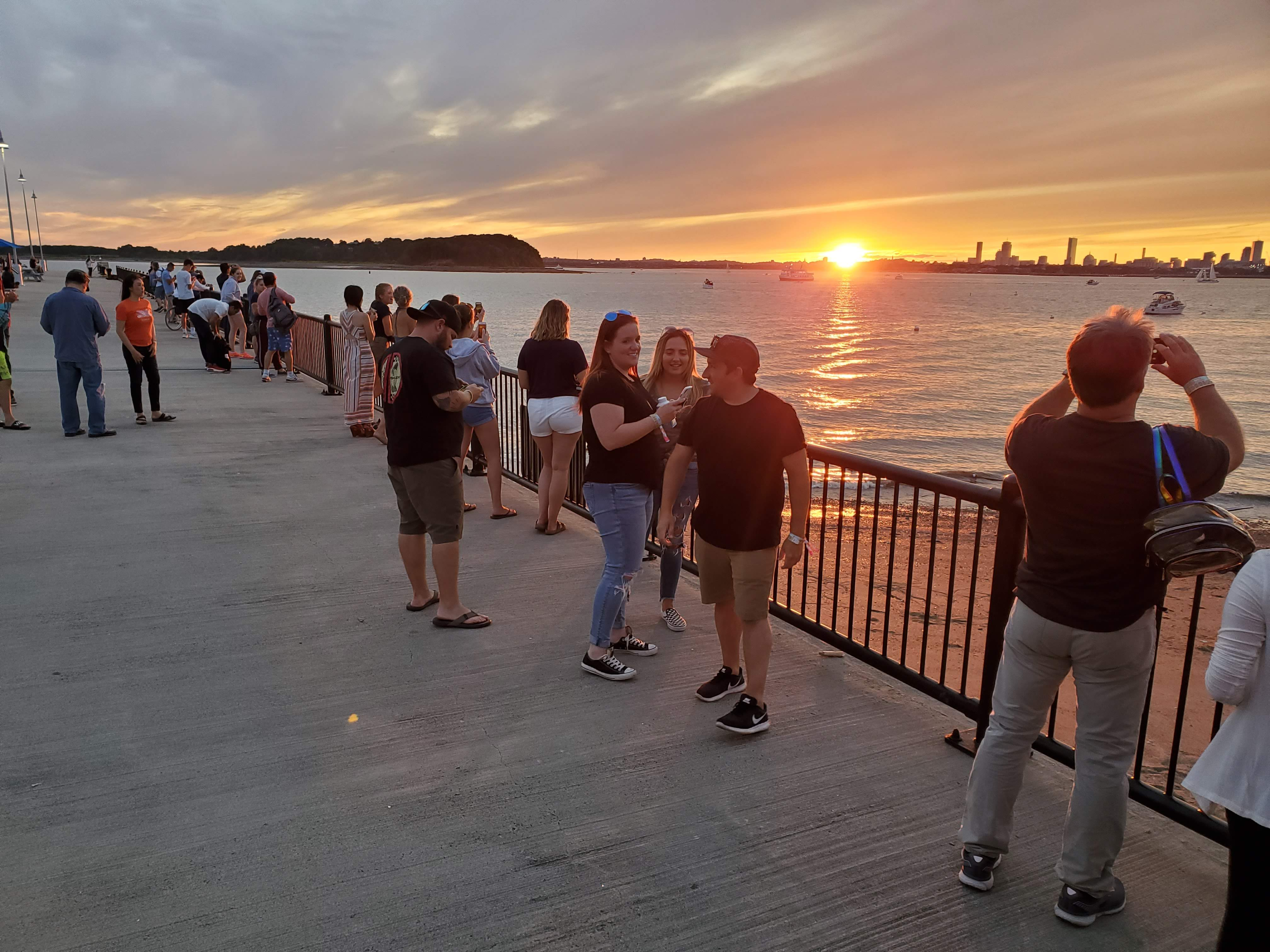
Visitors on the ferry pier at sunset

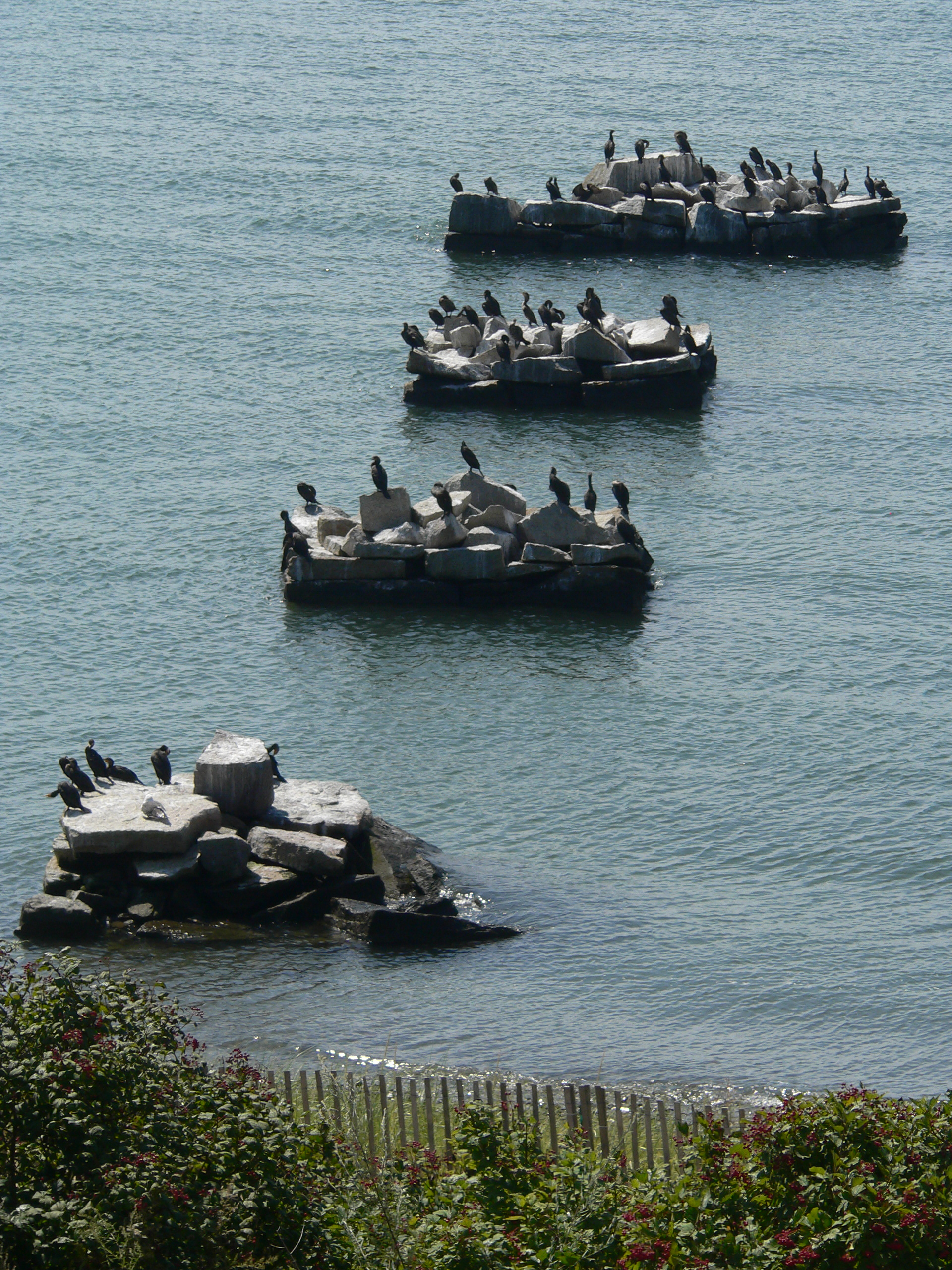
Cormorants on abandoned pier pilings
