= French ship Magnifique =

Six ships of the French Navy have been named Magnifique:

== Ships named Magnifique ==
- Courtisan (1671), a 64-gun ship of the line, bore the name during her career
- Magnifique (1685), a galley
- Magnifique (1686), a 70-gun ship of the line
- Magnifique (1692), an 80-gun ship of the line
- Magnifique (1749), a 74-gun ship of the line, lead ship of her class
- Magnifique (1814), an 80-gun Bucentaure-class ship of the line
