= Delia Bacon =

American writer

Delia Salter Bacon
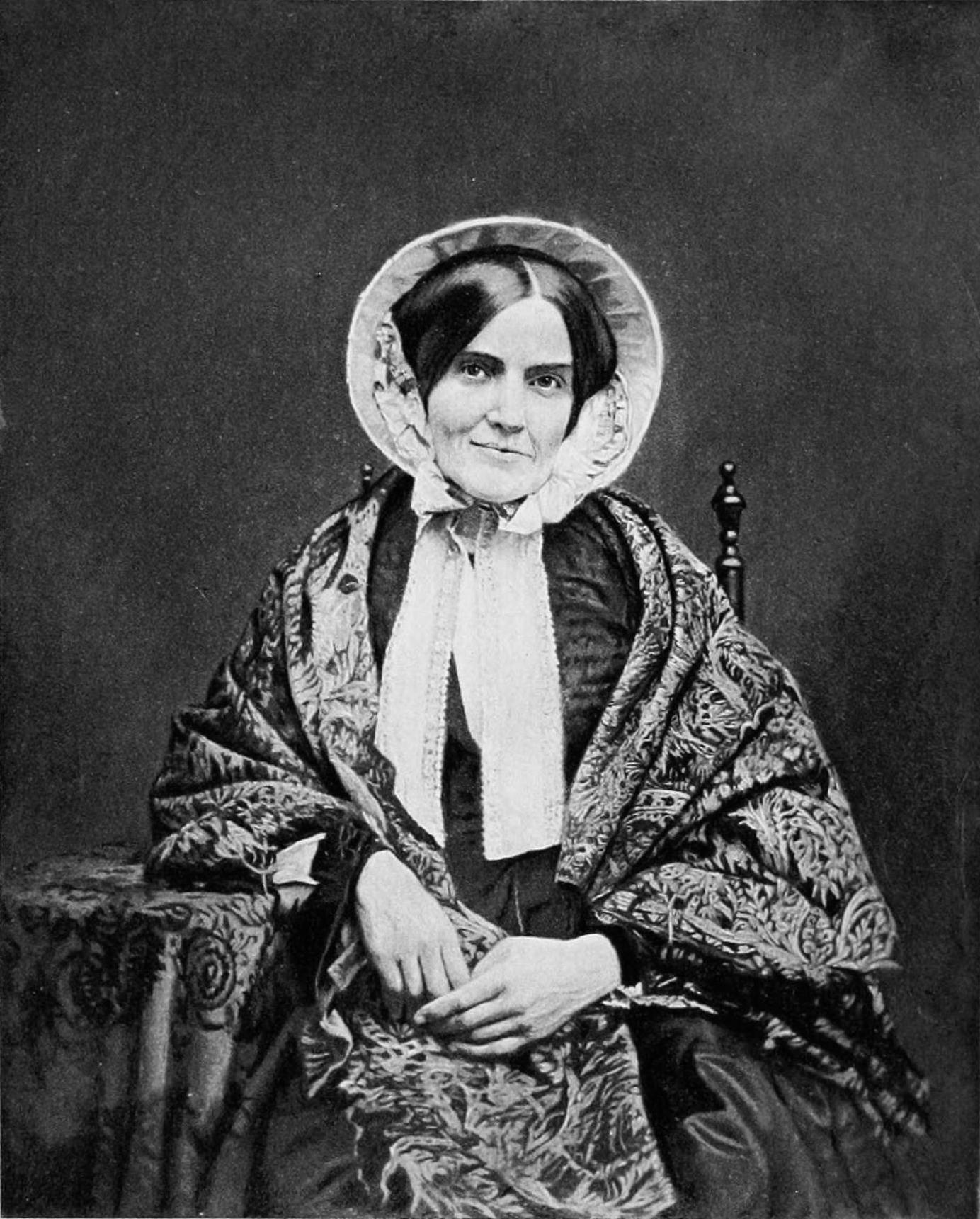
- Delia Bacon, from a daguerreotype taken in 1853.
- Born: February 2, 1811; Tallmadge, Ohio, U.S.
- Died: September 2, 1859 (aged 48)
- Resting place: Grove Street Cemetery, New Haven, Connecticut, U.S.
- Occupations: writer of plays and short stories; Shakespeare scholar
- Writing career
- Language: English

Delia Salter Bacon (February 2, 1811 – September 2, 1859) was an American writer of plays and short stories and Shakespeare scholar. She is best known for her work on the authorship of Shakespeare's plays, which she attributed to social reformers including Francis Bacon (to whom she was unrelated), Sir Walter Raleigh and others.

Bacon's research in Boston, New York, and London led to the publication of her major work on the subject, The Philosophy of the Plays of Shakspere Unfolded. Her admirers included authors Harriet Beecher Stowe, Nathaniel Hawthorne and Ralph Waldo Emerson, the last of whom called her "America's greatest literary producer of the past ten years" at the time of her death.

== Biography ==
Bacon was born in a frontier log cabin in Tallmadge, Ohio, the youngest daughter of Congregational minister David Bacon, who in pursuit of a vision, had abandoned New Haven for the wilds of Ohio. The venture quickly collapsed, and the family returned to New England, where her father died soon after. The impoverished state of their finances permitted only her elder brother Leonard to receive a tertiary education, at Yale, while her own formal education ended when she was fourteen. She became a teacher in schools in Connecticut, New Jersey, and New York, and then, until about 1852, became a distinguished professional lecturer, conducting, in various cities in the eastern United States, classes for women in history and literature by methods she devised. At age 20, in 1831, she published her first book, Tales of the Puritans anonymously, consisting of three long stories on colonial life. In 1832, she beat Edgar Allan Poe to win a short-story contest sponsored by the Philadelphia Saturday Courier.

In 1836, Bacon moved to New York, and became an avid theatre-goer. She met the leading Shakespearean actress Ellen Tree soon after, and persuaded her to take the lead role in a play she was writing, partly in blank verse, entitled The Bride of Fort Edward, based on her award-winning story, Love's Martyr, about Jane M'Crea. The play, however, was never performed, due in part to Bacon's health and the harsh criticisms of her brother. It was published anonymously in 1839 (with a note claiming it was "not a play"). The text was reviewed favorably by the Saturday Courier and Edgar Allan Poe, but proved to be a commercial flop.

Returning to New Haven, Bacon met Yale-educated minister Alexander MacWhorter in 1846. Time in each other's company and a trip to Northampton convinced many of the impropriety of their relationship. MacWhorter was brought to ecclesiastical trial by Bacon's brother Leonard for "dishonorable conduct," but was acquitted in a 12–11 vote. Public opinion compelled Bacon to leave New Haven for Ohio, while Catharine Beecher wrote a book defending her conduct.

Bacon died in 1859, having in 1858 been placed by her family in the care of a lunatic asylum at Hartford, Connecticut. According to her nephew, Theodore Bacon, she had been seized by a "violent mania" while in England, and had been "removed to an excellent private asylum for a small number of insane persons" at Henley-in-Arden, Warwickshire, before being brought back to America.

== Shakespeare authorship theory ==
Delia Bacon withdrew from public life and lecturing in early 1845, and began to research intensively a theory she was developing over the authorship of Shakespeare's works, which she mapped out by October of that year. However a decade was to pass before her book The Philosophy of the Plays of Shakespeare Unfolded (1857) was to see print. During these years she was befriended by Nathaniel Hawthorne and Ralph Waldo Emerson, and, after securing sponsorship to travel for research to England, in May 1853, met Thomas Carlyle, who though intrigued, shrieked loudly as he heard her exposition.

This was the heyday of higher criticism, which was claiming to have uncovered the multiple authorship of the Bible and positing the composite nature of masterpieces like those attributed to Homer. It was also a period of rising bardolatry, the deification of Shakespeare's genius, and a widespread, almost hyperbolic veneration for the philosophical genius of Francis Bacon. Delia Bacon was influenced by these currents. Like many of her time, she approached Shakespearean drama as philosophical masterpieces written for a closed aristocratic society of courtiers and monarchs, and found it difficult to believe they were written either with commercial intent or for a popular audience. Puzzled by the gap between the bare facts of William Shakespeare's life and his vast literary output, she intended to prove that the plays attributed to Shakespeare were written by a coterie of men, including Francis Bacon, Sir Walter Raleigh and Edmund Spenser, for the purpose of inculcating a philosophic system, for which they felt that they themselves could not afford to assume the responsibility. This system she set out to discover beneath the superficial text of the plays. From her friendship with Samuel Morse, an authority on codes, and encryption for the telegraph, she learned of Bacon's interest in secret ciphers, and this prompted her own approach to the authorship question.

Her theory proposed that the missing fourth part of Francis Bacon's unfinished magnum opus, the Instauratio Magna had in fact survived in the form of the plays attributed to Shakespeare. Delia Bacon argued that the great plays were the collective effort of a:

little clique of disappointed and defeated politicians who undertook to head and organize popular opposition against the government, and were compelled to retreat from that enterprise.. .Driven from one field, they showed themselves in another. Driven from the open field, they fought in secret.

The cenacle opposing the 'despotism' of Queen Elizabeth I and King James, like the knights of King Arthur's Round Table consisted of Francis Bacon, Walter Raleigh, and perhaps Edmund Spenser, Lord Buckhurst and the Earl of Oxford, all putatively employing playwriting to speak to both rulers and the ruled as committed republicans vindicating that cause against tyranny. She had, in James S. Shapiro's reading, a "revolutionary agenda" that consisted in upturning the myths of America's founding fathers and the Puritan heritage.

Bacon's skeptical attitude towards the orthodox view of Shakespearean authorship invoked contempt of many, such as Richard Grant White. However, Emerson assisted her in publishing her first essay on the Shakespearean question in the January 1856 issue of Putnam's Magazine:

How can we undertake to account for the literary miracles of antiquity, while this great myth of the modern ages still lies at our own door, unquestioned? This vast, magical, unexplained phenomenon which our own times have proceed under our own eyes, appears to be, indeed, the only thing which our modern rationalism is not to be permitted to meddle with. For, here the critics themselves still veil their faces, filling the air with mystic utterances which seem to say, that to this shrine at least, for the footstep of the common reason and the common sense, there is yet no admittance.

Emerson, who greatly admired Bacon, and who was skeptical of her claim, wrote that she would need "enchanted instruments, nay alchemy itself, to melt into one identity these two reputations", and retrospectively remarked that America had only two "producers" during the 1850s, "Our wild Whitman, with real inspiration but checked by [a] titanic abdomen; and Delia Bacon, with genius, but mad and clinging like a tortoise to English soil." Though he was intrigued by her insights into the plays, he grew skeptical of the 'magical cipher' of which Bacon wrote without ever producing evidence for it.

According to Walt Whitman, himself among the most outspoken of 19th century anti-Stratfordians, she was "the sweetest, eloquentist, grandest woman…that America has so far produced….and, of course, very unworldly, just in all ways such a woman as was calculated to bring the whole literary pack down on her, the orthodox, cruel, stately, dainty, over-fed literary pack – worshipping tradition, unconscious of this day’s honest sunlight."

James Shapiro interprets her theory both in terms of the cultural tensions of her historical milieu, and as consequential on an intellectual and emotional crisis that unfolded as she both broke with her Puritan upbringing and developed a deep confidential relationship with a fellow lodger, Alexander MacWhorter, a young theology graduate from Yale, which was subsequently interrupted by her brother. MacWhorter was absolved of culpability in a subsequent ecclesiastical trial, whose verdict led to a rift between Delia and her fellow congregationalists.

== Legacy ==
One recent assessment echoes the favorable view of Bacon held by Emerson, Hawthorne, and Whitman:

For too long critics have depicted [her] as a tragicomic figure, blindly pursuing a fantastic mission in obscurity and isolation, only to end in silence and madness….this is not to say that the stereotype is without basis. On the contrary, her sad story established an archetype for the story of the Shakespeare authorship at large – or at least one element of it: an otherworldly pursuit of truth that produces gifts for a world that is indifferent or hostile to them.

James S. Shapiro argues that her political reading of the plays, and her insistence on collaborative authorship, anticipated modern approaches by a century and a half.

Had she limited her argument to these points instead of conjoining it to an argument about how Shakespeare couldn't have written them, there is little doubt that, instead of being dismissed as a crank and a madwoman, she would be hailed today as the precursor of the New Historicists, and the first to argue that the plays anticipated the political upheavals England experienced in the mid-seventeenth century. But Delia Bacon couldn't stop at that point. Nor could she concede that the republican ideas she located in the plays circulated widely at the time and were as available to William Shakespeare as they were to Walter Raleigh or Francis Bacon.

Her nephew, Theodore Bacon, wrote a biography of her entitled Delia Bacon: A Sketch (Boston, 1888), and Nathaniel Hawthorne included an appreciative chapter, "Recollections of a Gifted Woman", in his book Our Old Home (Boston, 1863).

She died in Hartford, Connecticut. She is interred in Grove Street Cemetery in New Haven, Connecticut.

Bacon and her theories are featured heavily in Jennifer Lee Carrell's novel Interred with Their Bones.
