= French ship Guerrier (1753) =

Ship of the line of the French Navy

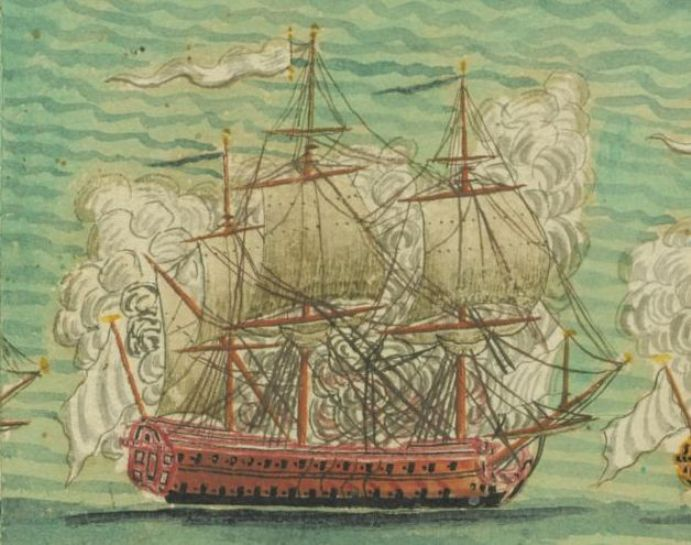
- Guerrier at the Battle of Minorca (1756)

History

France
- Name: Guerrier
- Namesake: "Warrior"
- Ordered: 18 September 1750
- Builder: Toulon
- Laid down: 3 September 1750
- Launched: 9 September 1753
- In service: January 1754
- Captured: 2 August 1798
- Fate: Burnt by the British after the Battle of the Nile

General characteristics
- Class & type: Magnifique-class ship of the line
- Displacement: 2700 tonneaux
- Tons burthen: 1455 port tonneaux
- Length: 53.6 m (175 ft 10 in)
- Beam: 14 m (45 ft 11 in)
- Draught: 6.6 m (21 ft 8 in)
- Propulsion: Sail
- Complement: 678 men
- Armament: 74 guns

Guerrier was a Magnifique-class 74-gun ship of the line of the French Navy.

She took part in the Battle of Minorca (1756) and in the Battle of Lagos. She was part of Bougainville's squadron for the Naval operations in the American Revolutionary War, and took part in the operations before the Battle of Rhode Island, in the Battle of Grenada, and in the siege of Savannah.

In July 1781, she took part in the Invasion of Minorca.

By the time of the invasion of Egypt, Guerrier should have been decommissioned for two years, but was nevertheless incorporated in the invasion fleet. She took part in the Battle of the Nile, where she was captured by the British. She was so badly damaged that she was burnt.

== See also ==
- List of ships captured in the 19th century
