= Interred with Their Bones =

Book by Jennifer Lee Carrell

Interred With Their Bones
- First U.S. edition cover
- Author: Jennifer Lee Carrell
- Publisher: Plume (US); Sphere, (UK)
- Publication place: United States; United Kingdom
- Pages: 416 (U.S. paperback); 480 (UK paperback)
- ISBN: 0-452-28989-0 (US) / 0751540358 (UK)
- Followed by: Haunt Me Still

Interred With Their Bones is a novel by Jennifer Lee Carrell published in 2007. It was published in the United Kingdom as The Shakespeare Secret. The novel's plot and structure have been compared to The Da Vinci Code.

Its success led to a sequel, Haunt Me Still (UK: The Shakespeare Curse), about the further adventures of the heroine Kate Stanley.

== Plot ==
On the eve of a production of Hamlet at Shakespeare's Globe, Shakespeare scholar and theater director Kate Stanley’s eccentric mentor, Harvard Professor Roz Howard, gives her a mysterious box, claiming to have made a groundbreaking discovery. But before she can reveal it to Kate, the Globe burns to the ground and Roz is found dead, murdered precisely in the manner of Hamlet’s father. Inside the box Kate finds the first piece in a Shakespearean puzzle, setting her on a deadly, high-stakes treasure hunt.

== Historical background ==
The novel draws heavily on Shakespeare authorship theories, notably Oxfordian theory and Derbyite theory. The author’s note appended to the book explains the historical information used and the ways in which the real-life story of Delia Bacon and of the lost play Cardenio has been incorporated into the narrative. She also draws on her own research on the influence of Shakespeare in the old west.
