= Lovells Island Range Lights =

Lighthouse in Boston, Massachusetts, U.S.

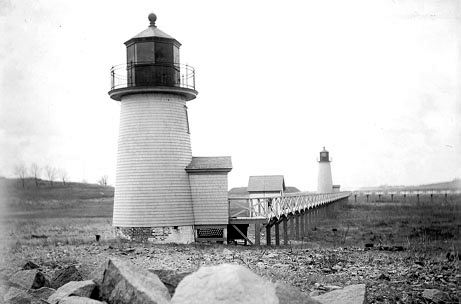
- Location: Boston, Massachusetts
- Coordinates: 42°19′58″N 70°55′50″W

Tower
- Constructed: 1903
- Foundation: Unknown
- Construction: Wood
- Shape: Conical
- Markings: White with black lanterns
- Fog signal: none

Light
- Deactivated: 1939
- Lens: 4th order Fresnel lenses

The Lovells Island Range Lights were range lights on Lovells Island in Boston Harbor, Massachusetts. They were built in 1903 to help vessels coming into what is now called "South Channel". As the North Channel was dredged deeper, the South Channel was less used and they were removed in 1939 to make room for the expansion of Fort Standish. The oil shed from the lights remains today.

They were 400 feet (120 m) apart on a magnetic bearing of 228°, with a seven-foot walkway connecting them.
