= Alexander MacWhorter =

American clergyman

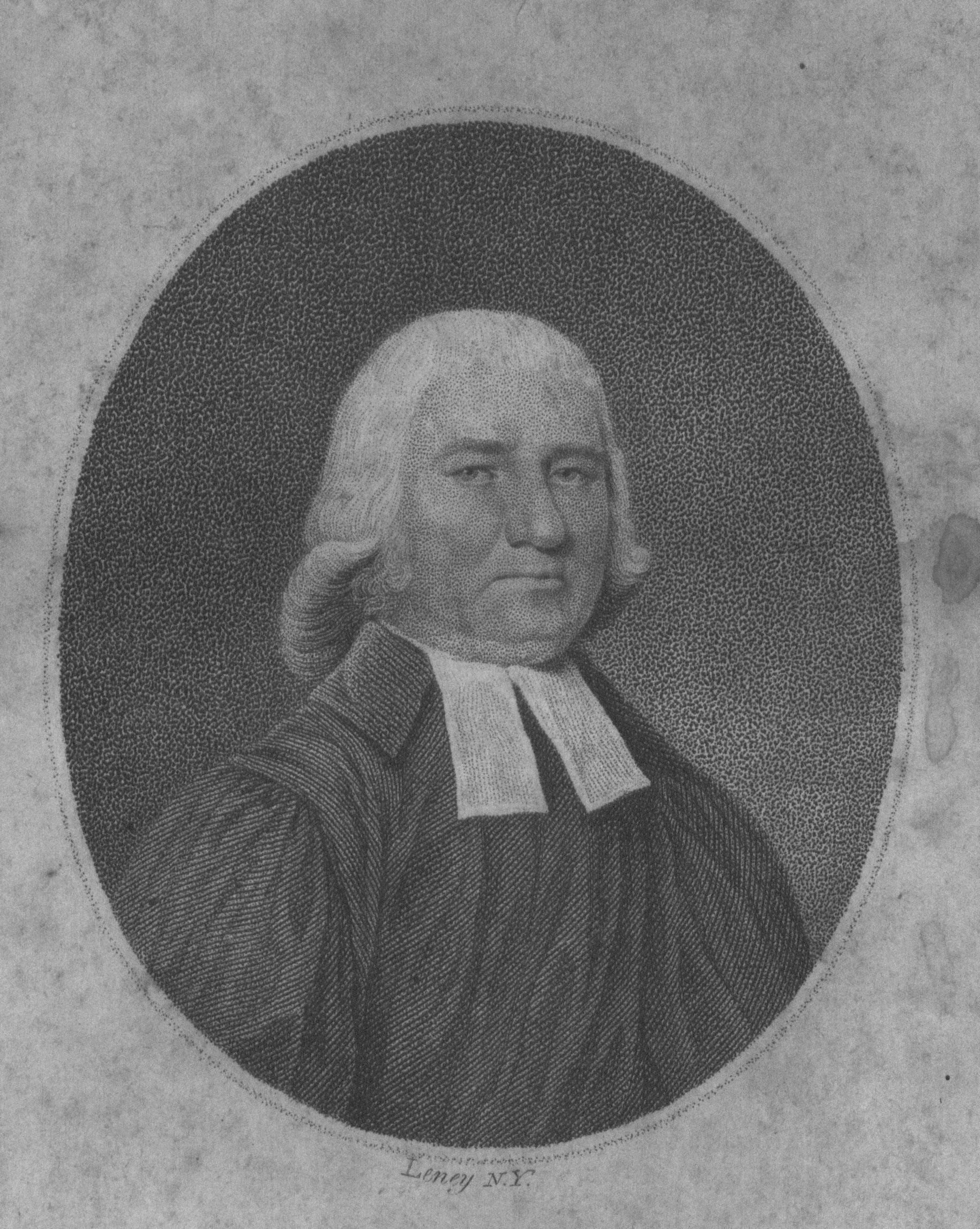
Alexander MacWhorter

Alexander MacWhorter, DD (also spelled McWhorter; July 26, 1734 – July 20, 1807) was an American clergyman.

== Biography ==
MacWhorter was born in New Castle, Delaware Colony, 26 July 1734. His parents, who were Scots-Irish immigrants, came to America from Northern Ireland in 1730, and settled in Newcastle, where his father, formerly a linen merchant, became a farmer and an active member of the Presbyterian church.

MacWhorter graduated at Princeton University in 1757, studied theology with William Tennent, was licensed to preach in 1758, and in the following year became pastor of a church in Newark, New Jersey. In 1764 he was appointed by the synod of New York and Philadelphia to a mission in North Carolina, where his friends were settled, returning to Newark in 1766 after a visit to Boston.

In 1775 he was sent by Congress to western North Carolina to persuade the royalists to unite with the patriot cause, and in 1776 he visited the American army in its camp opposite Trenton, to confer with regard to measures for protecting the state, and was present at the passage of the Delaware and the surprise of the Hessians. In 1778, at the solicitation of General Henry Knox, he acted as chaplain of Knox's artillery brigade.

In 1779 he accepted a pastorate and the presidency of Charlotte Academy in Mecklenburg County, North Carolina, from which place he was compelled to flee before the approach of Cornwallis' army, losing his library and other possessions. He was recalled to Newark in 1781, where he remained until his death. In 1788 he aided in forming the constitution of the Presbyterian Church of the United States, and was a trustee of the General Assembly. He was also a trustee of Princeton for thirty-five years, and took an active part in soliciting funds in New England for rebuilding the college after the fire of 1802. Yale College gave him the degree of D. D. in 1776. He published a Century Sermon describing the settlement and progress of Newark (1800), and a collection of sermons (2 vols., Newark, 1803)

He died in Newark, New Jersey, 20 July 1807.

His great-grandson, Alexander, clergyman, born in Newark, New Jersey, 1 January 1822; died in New Haven, Connecticut, 28 June. 1880, was graduated at Yale in 1842, studied three years in the theological department there, and was licensed to preach in 1844. In 1859-'60 he was professor of metaphysics and English literature in Troy university. He received deacon's orders in the" Protestant Episcopal church in 1863. He was a profound Hebrew scholar, and, in addition to magazine articles upon metaphysics and theology, was the author of Yahveh Christ, or the Memorial Name, with an introductory letter by Nathaniel W. Taylor, D.D. (Boston, 1857). The object of this work is to prove that the Hebrew word Jehovah should be Yahveh, denoting Christ.
