= Spectacle Island Range Lights =

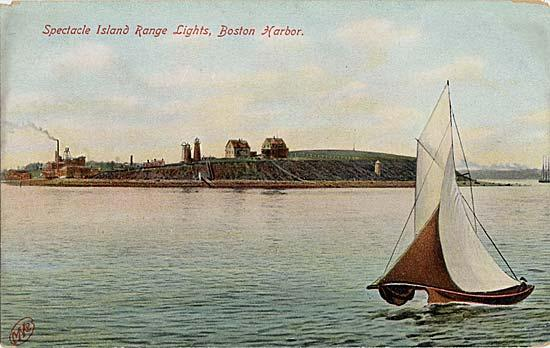
- A 1907 postcard showing the range lights (the two white towers)
- Location: Spectacle Island, Boston, United States
- Coordinates: 42°20′N 70°59′W

Tower
- Constructed: 1897
- Foundation: masonry
- Construction: wood
- Shape: octagonal
- Markings: White, later white with red center stripe

Light
- Deactivated: 1913
- Spectacle Island Range Front Light
- Height: 29 ft (8.8 m)
- Characteristic: F R
- Spectacle Island Range Rear Light
- Height: 54 ft (16 m)
- Characteristic: F R

The Spectacle Island Range Lights were a pair of range lights on Spectacle Island in Boston Harbor. They were established in 1897 and discontinued in 1913 after changes in the entrance channels to the harbor made them obsolete.

== History ==
A range to mark the channel into Boston harbor was requested by the Lighthouse Board in 1892; the appropriation was not passed until 1895. Two identical octagonal towers were constructed, each equipped with a red reflector light. Originally painted white, they were repainted with a red band in the midsection in 1904. At the same time the two towers were relocated 15 feet (4.6 m) south.

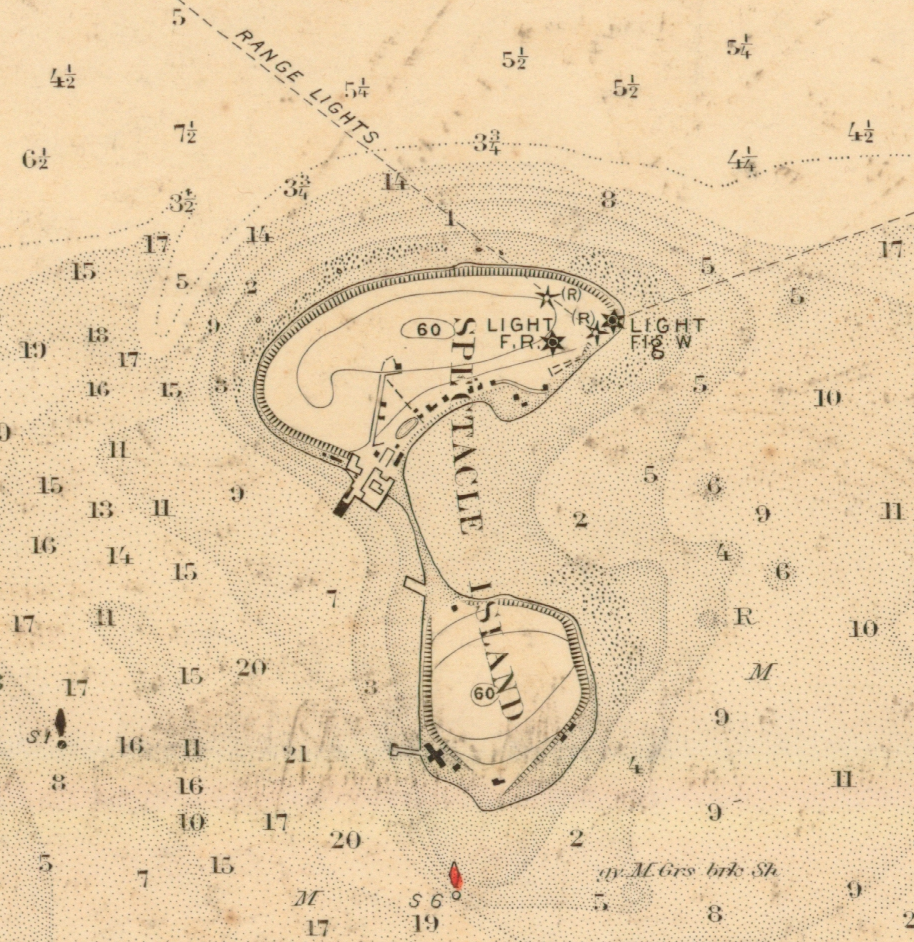
Spectacle Island in 1909, showing the Spectacle Island range with five pointed stars and the Broad Sound Channel range with six pointed stars

The year before the relocation, the Broad Sound Channel Inner Range Lights had been built on the island, immediately adjacent to the older lights. The two sets of lights were often confused, and when it was proposed to discontinue the Spectacle Island range because the channel had shifted, the discontinuance was objected to because it was thought the other range was going to be eliminated. The confusion was cleared up and the objections withdrawn, and the Spectacle Island range was discontinued in 1913.
