= Alexander MacWhorter III =

American theologian and author

Alexander MacWhorter (January 1, 1822 – June 28, 1880) was an American theologian and author.

== Early life ==
MacWhorter, the third of his name, was born in Newark, New Jersey on January 1, 1822. He was the only surviving child of Alexander C. MacWhorter and Frances C. G. (née Lawrence) MacWhorter. His paternal grandfather was fellow clergyman Alexander MacWhorter. He graduated from Yale College in 1842. He studied for three years in the Theological Department of Yale College, and was licensed to preach in 1844.

== Career ==
After 1845 he continued to reside in New Haven, pursuing philosophical and theological studies, with the exception of a brief residence (1859–60) in Troy, N Y., as Professor of Metaphysics and English Literature in Troy University. MacWhorter received deacon's orders in the Protestant Episcopal Church, May 31, 1863, at the hands of Bishop Potter of New York.

He published a volume entitled Yahveh Christ, or the Memonal Name, besides several magazine articles on metaphysical and theological subjects. During the extreme heat in June, 1880, he had labored assiduously to finish an article for the Princeton Review, and at the close of his labors was struck with apoplexy on Friday, the 24th.

== Personal life ==
In 1847, MacWhorter was embroiled in a noted scandal of the day, the subject of Catharine Beecher's book Truth Stranger than Fiction (1850). MacWhorter had become friends with a fellow lodger at New Haven's Tontine Hotel, the older, unmarried author Delia Bacon, who would later be notable for her speculative writing about the Shakespeare authorship question. After a time, their relationship became the subject of gossip because, as per the current customs, two unmarried people spending a significant amount of time together would be expected to result in their marriage. When Bacon's brother, Rev. Leonard Bacon, learned from MacWhorter that the latter had no intention of marrying her, he had MacWhorter brought up on charges that resulted in an ecclesiastical trial. A close 12-11 decision resulted in only a reprimand for MacWhorter.

On September 7, 1857, he married Henrietta Whitney Blake (1825–1901), a daughter of Eli Whitney Blake of New Haven, who survived him without children.

He died on Tuesday, June 28, 1880, at the age of 58.
