= Magnifique-class ship of the line =

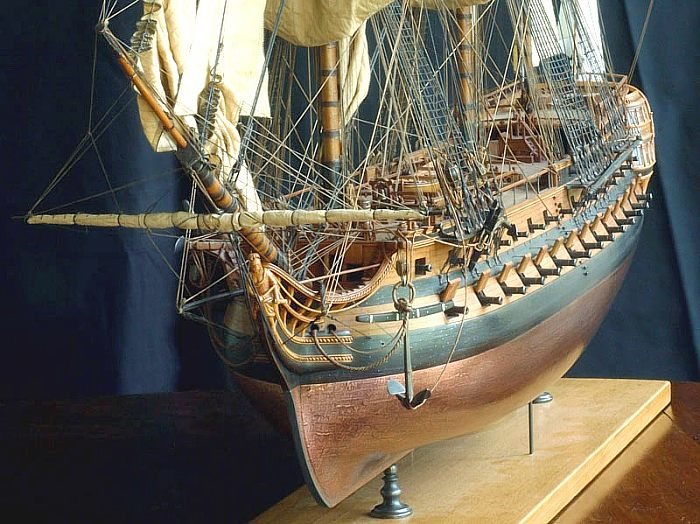
- A 74-gun French ship of the line similar to the Magnifique-class ships of the line

Class overview
- Name: Magnifique
- Builders: Toulon
- Operators: French Navy
- In service: 1750 - 1798
- Completed: 3

General characteristics
- Type: Ship of the line
- Displacement: 2700 tonneaux
- Tons burthen: 1455 port tonneaux
- Length: 53.6 m (175 ft 10 in)
- Beam: 14 m (45 ft 11 in)
- Draught: 6.6 m (21 ft 8 in)
- Depth of hold: 6.6 m (21 ft 8 in)
- Propulsion: Sail
- Complement: 750 in war, 660 in peace, + 6/12 officers
- Armament: 74 guns 16 × 8-pdr long guns
- Notes: Ships in class include: Magnifique, Entreprenant, Guerrier

The Magnifique class was a class of three 74-gun ships of the line, designed and built by Jacques-Luc Coulomb.

- Magnifique

Builder: Brest Dockyard
Laid down: 1747
Launched: 7 March 1749
Completed July 1750
Fate: 10 August 1782, Grounded on sandbar off Lovells Island, Boston, MA, USA

- Entreprenant

Builder: Brest Dockyard
Laid down: 1750
Launched: 19 October 1751
Completed: December 1752
Fate: Set on fire by British mortar attack at Louisbourg on 21 July 1758 and blew up.

- Guerrier

Builder: Toulon
Ordered: 18 September 1750
Laid down: October 1750
Launched: 7 September 1753
Completed: early 1754.
Fate: Captured by the British at the Battle of the Nile, 2 August 1798, and then burnt.
