= The Speckled Monster =

The Speckled Monster: A Historical Tale of Battling Smallpox
- Author: Jennifer Lee Carrell
- Language: English
- Genre: historical fiction
- ISBN: 978-0452285071

The Speckled Monster: A Historical Tale of Battling Smallpox is a book written by Jennifer Lee Carrell.

In 2015 Senator Rand Paul praised the book during the Republican presidential debate.

== Reception ==
Publishers Weekly called the book "engaging" but criticized all the dialog for slowing down the action.

Kirkus Reviews complained that the "narrative that runs on far too long".
