= Fort Standish (Boston, Massachusetts) =

- Part of Harbor Defenses of Boston
- Lovell's Island, Massachusetts
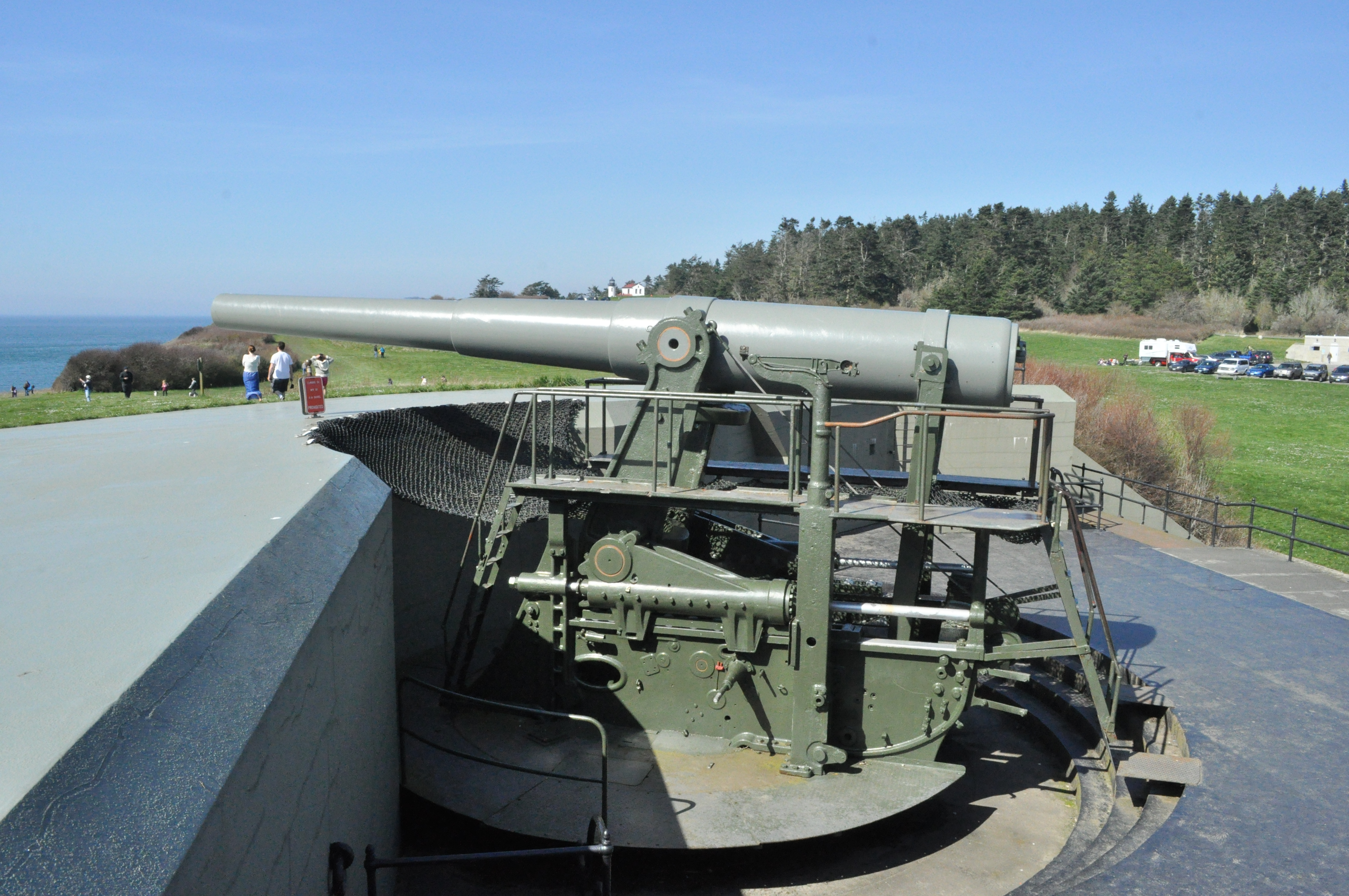
- 10-inch disappearing gun at Fort Casey, Washington state, similar to those at Fort Standish.

Site information
- Type: Coastal Defense
- Owner: Massachusetts
- Controlled by: Massachusetts Department of Conservation and Recreation
- Open to the public: yes

Location
- Location in Massachusetts
- Coordinates: 42°19′45.67″N 70°55′40.29″W

Site history
- Built: 1899
- Built by: United States Army
- In use: 1904-1946
- Battles/wars: World War I World War II

Fort Standish was a coastal fort completed in 1907 and located on Lovell's Island in Massachusetts. Named after Myles Standish, the fort would serve to host up to 7 batteries until it was disarmed and deactivated in 1947. It was also named Lovell's Island Military Reservation during the early part of its existence. It was part of the Coast (later Harbor) Defenses of Boston.

Along with Fort Warren, Fort Andrews, Fort Banks, Fort Strong, and others, it was among the first modern defenses of Boston Harbor. The fort was de-activated in 1947 and in 1962 became part of the Boston Harbor Islands National Recreation Area.

== History ==
=== Construction and armament ===
Fort Standish was built 1899-1907. The gun batteries over its history through 1947 included:

Name	No. of guns	Gun type	Carriage type	Years active
Burbeck	2	10-inch gun M1900	disappearing M1901	1907-1942
Morris	2	10-inch gun M1900	disappearing M1901	1907-1942
Terrill	3	6-inch gun M1897	disappearing M1898	1902-1943
Whipple	2	6-inch gun M1900	pedestal M1900	1904-1947
Vincent	4	3-inch gun M1898	masking parapet M1898	1904-1920
Weir	2	3-inch gun M1902 or M1903	pedestal	1904-1926
Williams	3	3-inch gun M1898	masking parapet M1898	1904-1946
Antiaircraft	2	Unknown, possibly 75 mm gun M1897	AA pedestal	1917-1923
Antiaircraft	2-3	3-inch gun M1917	AA pedestal	1925-1946
AMTB 943	4	90 mm gun	2 fixed M3, 2 towed	1943-1946

Batteries Burbeck and Morris were originally combined as Battery Burbeck, but were administratively separated in 1909. The 10-inch guns were the fort's main armament against enemy battleships; the 6-inch guns could fire more rapidly against cruisers. The 3-inch rapid fire guns were intended to defend an underwater mine field against minesweepers. One source states the fort was first garrisoned in 1909, and at that time the 10-inch guns had not yet been mounted and Battery Williams' guns were not on site.

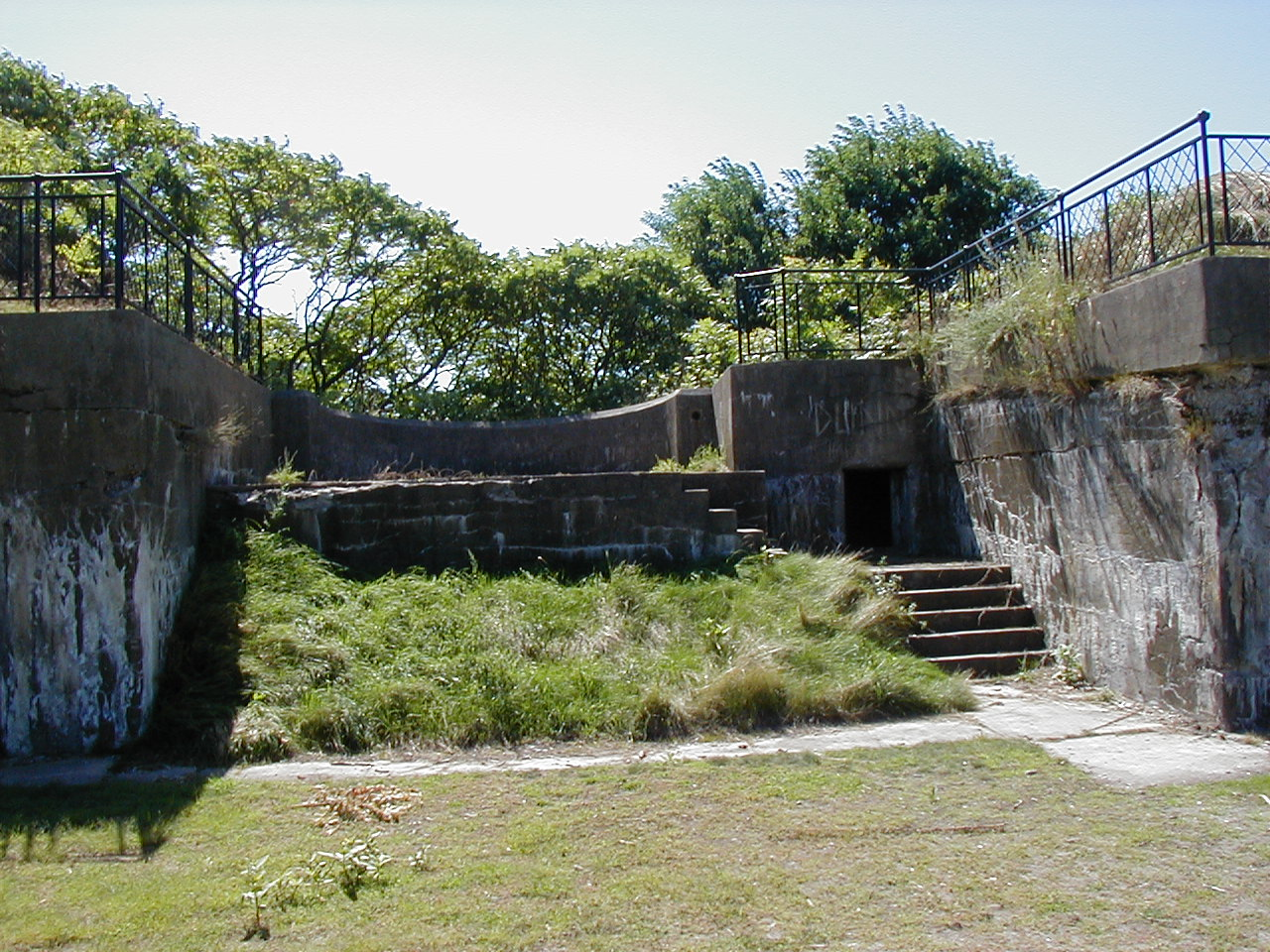
A 3-inch gun emplacement of Battery Williams at Fort Standish.

=== World War I through World War II ===
After the American entry into World War I in early 1917, the fort was expanded to include temporary structures such as quarters and additional storehouses. The 10-inch guns of Batteries Burbeck and Morris were earmarked for potential use as railway artillery but never left the fort. Battery Whipple's two 6-inch guns were removed from the fort in September 1917 for potential use on field carriages, but apparently were not sent overseas and were returned to the fort in April 1919. An antiaircraft battery of two guns was on the island 1917-1923. After the war the fort's support buildings were reduced to three "permanent" buildings.

In 1920 Battery Vincent was disarmed as part of a general removal from service of its 3-inch M1898 Driggs-Seabury guns. Official plans of the fort indicate that Battery Williams was also armed with this type of gun, but the battery was not removed from service until 1946. Both batteries are listed with "BP" (balanced pillar) carriages; this was a retractable carriage used for 5-inch guns that was functionally identical to the "masking parapet" carriages that were Driggs-Seabury's patent. In 1926 Battery Weir was disarmed and abandoned due to beach erosion; it is possible that Battery Williams was disarmed in 1920 and rearmed with Battery Weir's guns, or rearmed from some other source. In 1925 two of Battery Vincent's vacant positions were converted for an antiaircraft battery of two 3-inch M1917 antiaircraft guns; a third gun was added in 1938.

Prior to the American entry into World War II in December 1941, the fort also included many new temporary structures as it had previously in World War I. In addition, the fort's complement increased to around 800 men, including 14 officers and 4 NCOs. In 1942 the fort's 10-inch guns were scrapped; they were superseded by the long-range guns of Fort Duvall and Fort Ruckman, soon to be augmented by Battery Murphy at the East Point Military Reservation. Battery Terrill's 6-inch disappearing guns followed in 1943, leaving only Batteries Whipple and Williams active. That year Anti-Motor Torpedo Boat Battery (AMTB) 943 was built, with two fixed and two towed 90 mm guns.

Fort Standish's guns were scrapped and the fort abandoned in 1946-1947. The island was transferred to the state in 1958 and became part of the Boston Harbor Islands National Recreation Area in 1962.

== See also ==
- 9th Coast Artillery (United States)
- 241st Coast Artillery (United States)
- Seacoast defense in the United States
- United States Army Coast Artillery Corps
- List of military installations in Massachusetts
