= Lovells Island =

Island in Suffolk County, Massachusetts, United States

Coordinates: 42°19′46″N 70°55′41″W

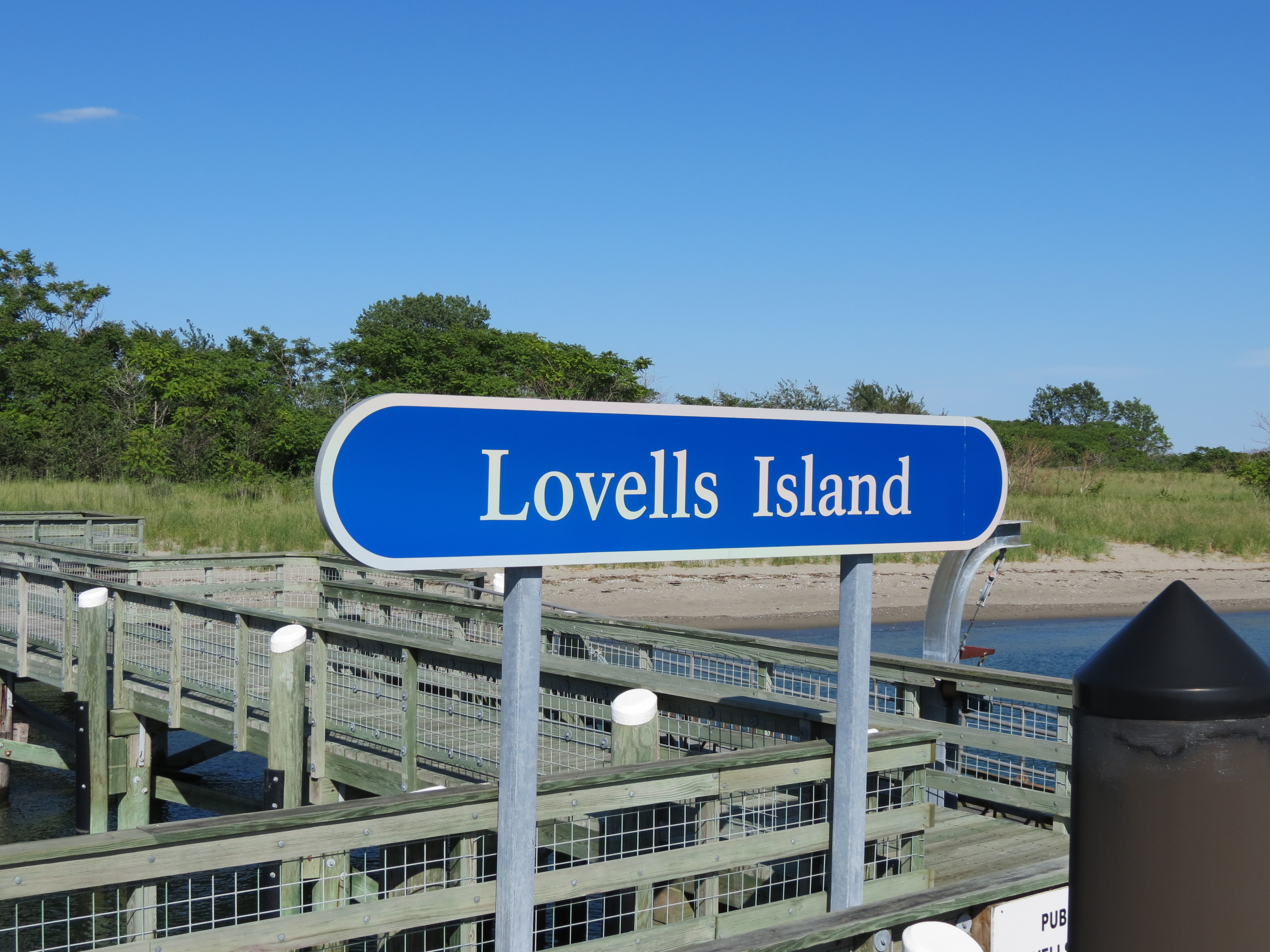
Lovells Island sign on the dock

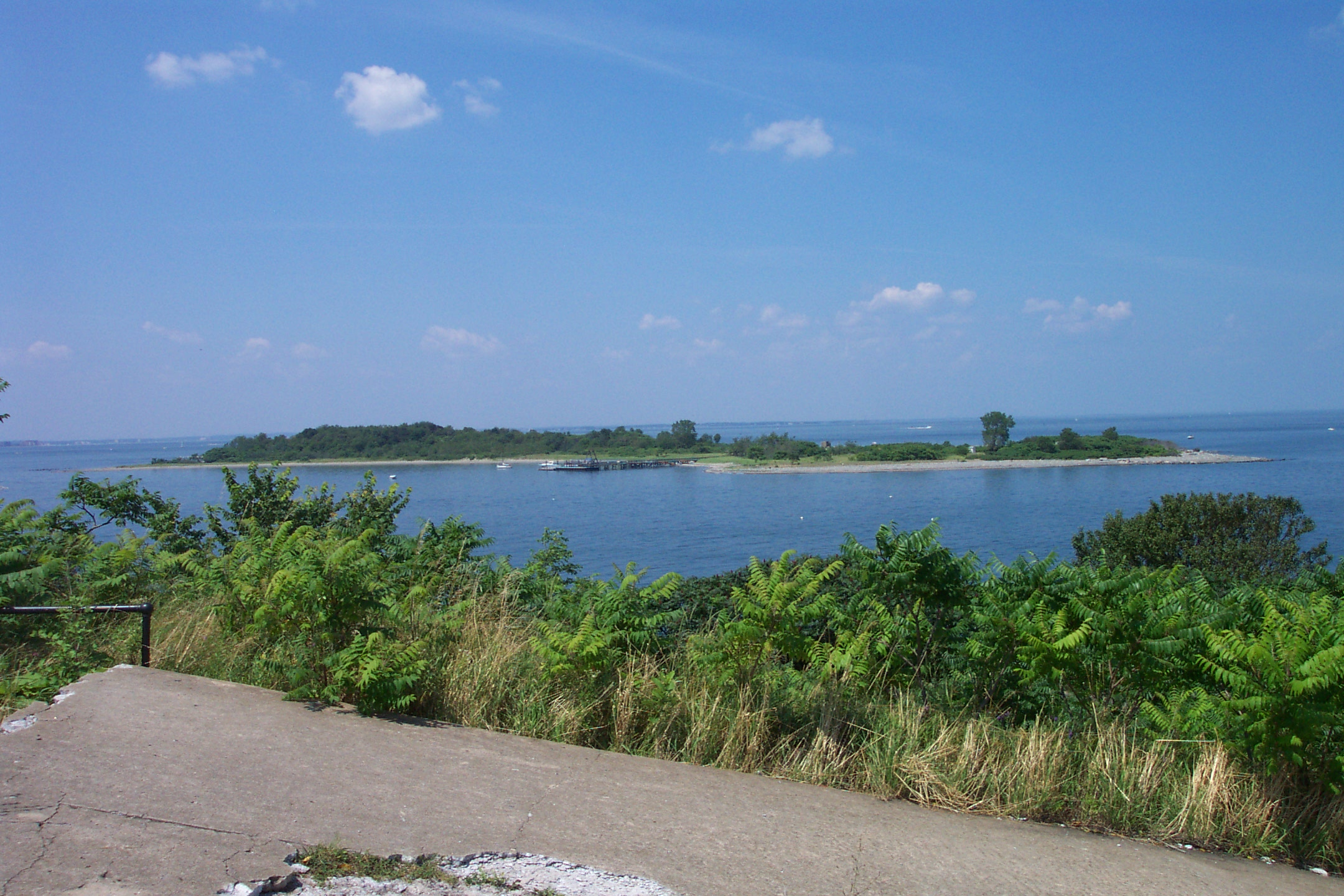
Lovells Island as viewed from Fort Warren on Georges Island

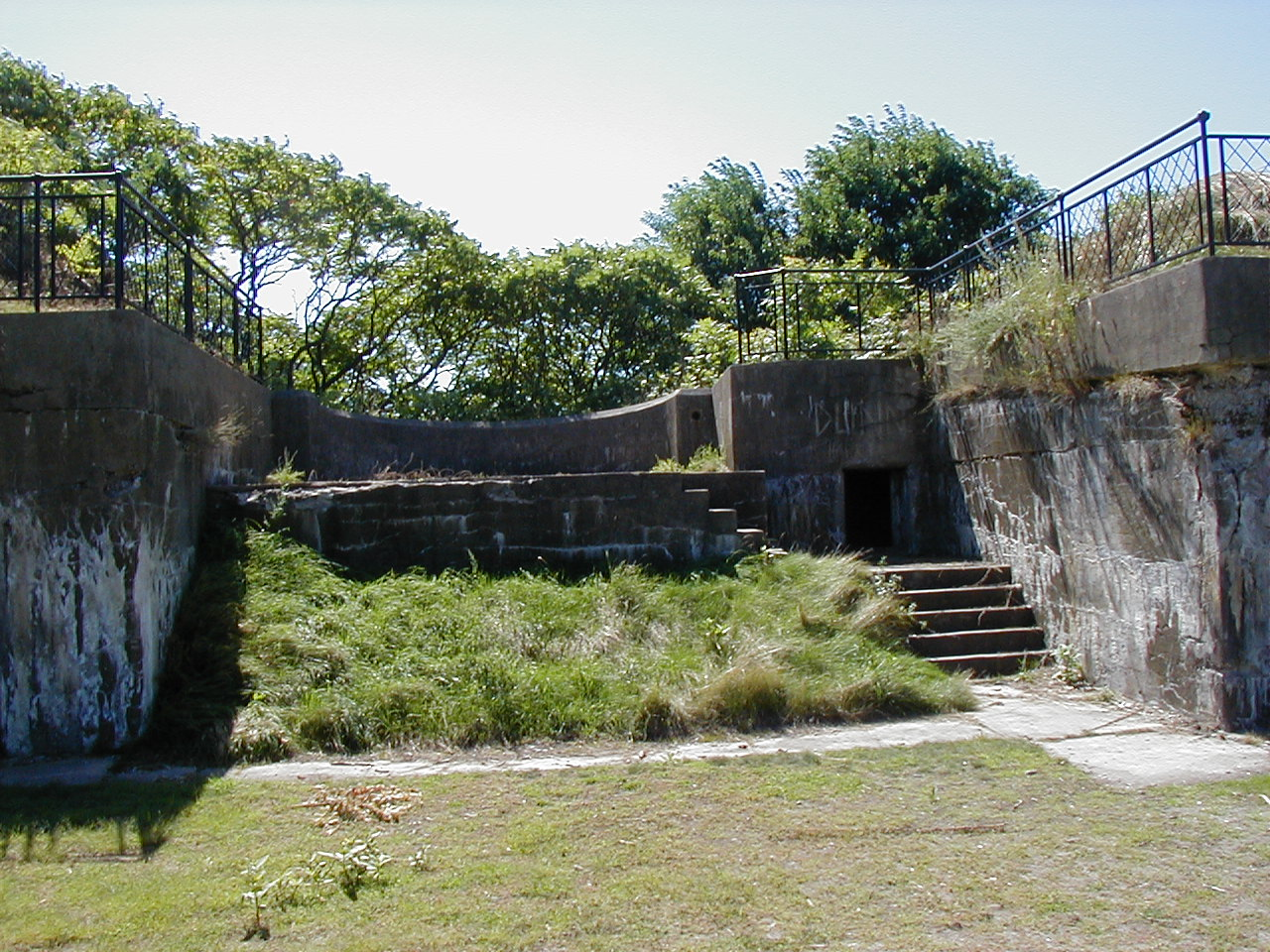
Battery Williams on Lovell's Island

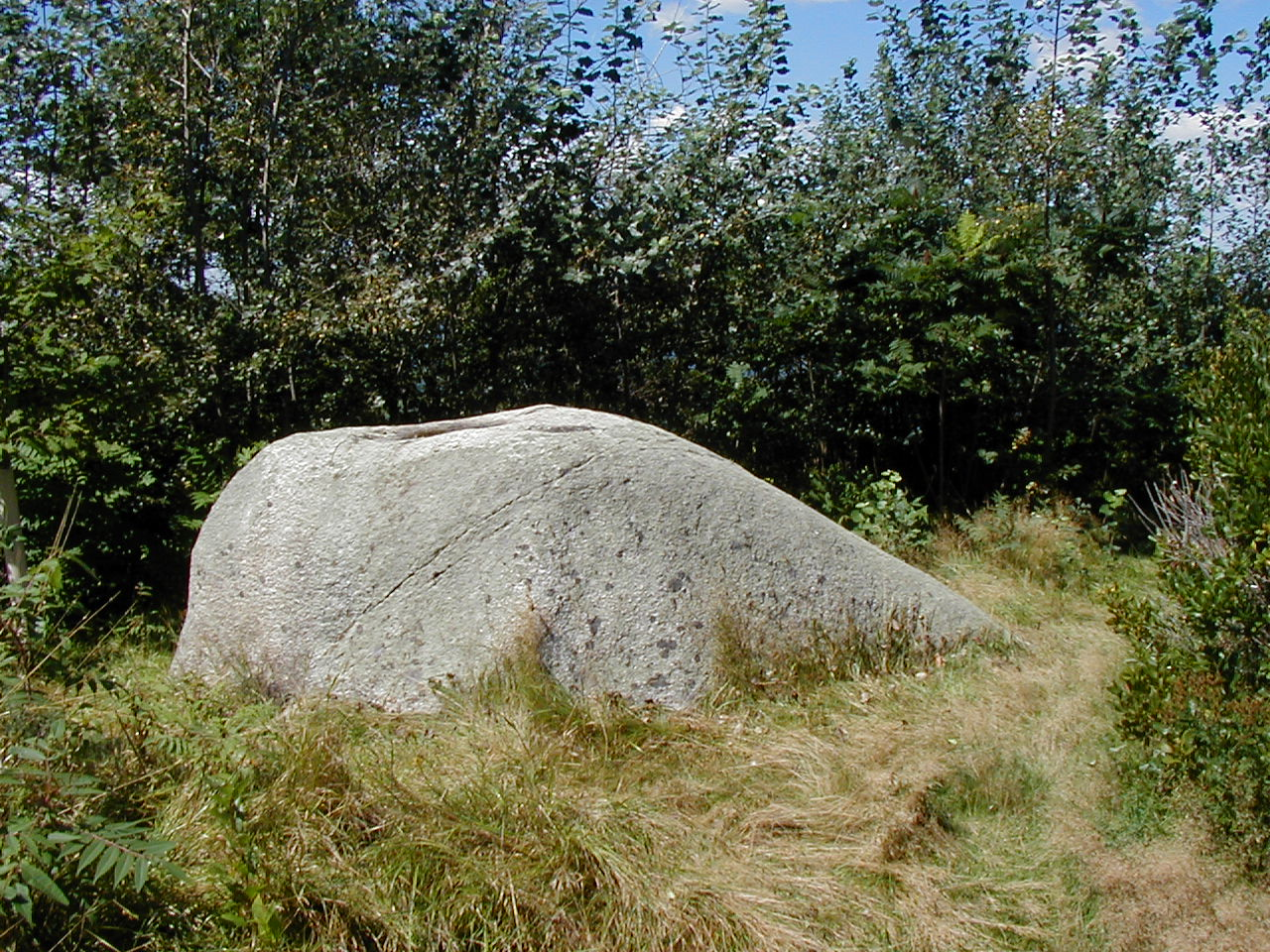
Lover's Rock, where two colonial-era shipwreck victims died during a snowstorm

Lovells Island, or Lovell's Island, is a 62-acre (250,000 m^{2}) island in the Boston Harbor Islands National Recreation Area, in Massachusetts. The island is across The Narrows from Georges Island and some 7 miles (11 km) offshore of downtown Boston. It is named after Captain William Lovell, who was an early settler of nearby Dorchester. The island is known as the site of several shipwrecks, including the 74-gun French warship Magnifique in 1782.

In December 1786, a passenger boat carrying 13 people crashed off the shore of Lovells Island. Coming from Damariscotta, Maine, and destined for the Boston Harbor, the boat sank within swimming distance to the harbor, and all aboard made it to shore. Without shelter or warmth and in the midst of a blizzard, 11 of the victims froze to death. One man, Theodore Kingsbury, made it through the night and was taken to the hospital in the morning where he was pronounced dead. Two of the victims aboard the ship, a Miss Sylvia Knapp and her fiancé (name unknown), were said to be found holding on to each other for warmth on top of a boulder, now dubbed "Lovers Rock". The Humane Society of the Commonwealth of Massachusetts constructed lifesaving huts in November 1787 around the harbor and the coast of Massachusetts, one on Lovells Island.

Lovells Island has had a succession of owners. In 1767, the town of Charlestown deeded the island to Elisha Leavitt Jr. of Hingham, Massachusetts, an infamous Tory who also owned Grape Island, where Leavitt later invited British forces to help themselves to his hay until they were chased off by patriots. Leavitt's payment for Lovells Island was set aside to pay for the town's school.

Lovells Island was used by Native Americans for fishing, gardening and trading. Later uses included harvesting the island's timber, as a fishing station, as a residence for the keepers of Boston Light, and as a rabbit run. Once the home of the Lovells Island Range Lights, the island was a buoy tending station in the early 20th century and was fortified before and during World War I, with remains of Fort Standish, active 1902-1946, still visible.

Much of the vegetation on the islands results from an attempt in the 1930s by the Civilian Conservation Corps to reestablish a natural forest on the island, although this was largely cleared when the fort was reactivated during World War II. Left to recover after the war, the island's plant life now includes remnant patches of stands of poplar, pine and spruce, together with successional species such as staghorn sumac, black cherry, chokecherry, apple, and gray birch. Common shrubs include bayberry, beach plum, raspberry, Virginia rose and saltspray rose.

Today, Lovells Island is a popular camping island, with picnic areas and walking trails through its dunes and woods, together with a non-supervised swimming beach. On weekends and summer weekdays, it is served by a shuttle boat to and from Georges Island, connecting there with ferries to Boston and Quincy.
