= Jennifer Lee Carrell =

American novelist

- Education: Harvard University (PhD)
- Writing career
- Genres: Suspense, mystery, thriller
- Website: jenniferleecarrell.com

Jennifer Lee Carrell is an American author of three novels and numerous articles for Smithsonian Magazine and Arizona Daily Star.

== Background ==
Born in Washington, D.C., Carrell spent a brief stint of her childhood in Long Beach, CA before moving with her family to her father's hometown, Tucson, Arizona. She graduated with undergraduate degrees from Stanford (1984) and Oxford (1988), and earned a PhD in English Literature from Harvard in 1994.

== Career ==
Beginning her career in academia, Carrell served as a lecturer in the "Hist & Lit" (History and Literature) Departments at Harvard from 1994 to 1997 and taught Expository Writing from 1997 to 1998. After getting her first freelance assignment from Smithsonian Magazine -- "How the Bard Won the West" — which explored Shakespeare's surprising popularity among cowboys, miners, and mountain men of the Old West, Carrell left university life in order to further pursue her writing.

She worked as the classical music, opera, and dance critic for the Arizona Daily Star (Tucson) from 1999 to 2001. She has directed Shakespeare plays for Harvard's Hyperion Theatre Company and served as a dramaturg for the Arizona Theatre Company.

== Personal life ==
Carrell resides in Tucson, Arizona with her husband and daughter.

== Novels ==
- Carrell, Jennifer (2003). The Speckled Monster. ISBN 978-0452285071. Barnes & Noble "Discover Great New Writers" book
- Carrell, Jennifer (2007). Interred with their Bones. ISBN 978-0525949701.
  - Republished as Carrell, Jennifer. The Shakespeare Secret. Sunday Times of London Top Ten; New York Times Bestseller List; Finalist, Best First Novel, International Thriller Writers (2008)
- Carrell, Jennifer (2010). Haunt Me Still. ISBN 9780525950776. Published in the UK as The Shakespeare Curse. Sunday Times (London) Top Ten; Indie notables, IndieBound (May 2010)
