= French ship Magnifique (1749) =

Ship of the line of the French Navy

Coordinates: 42°19′54″N 70°55′49″W

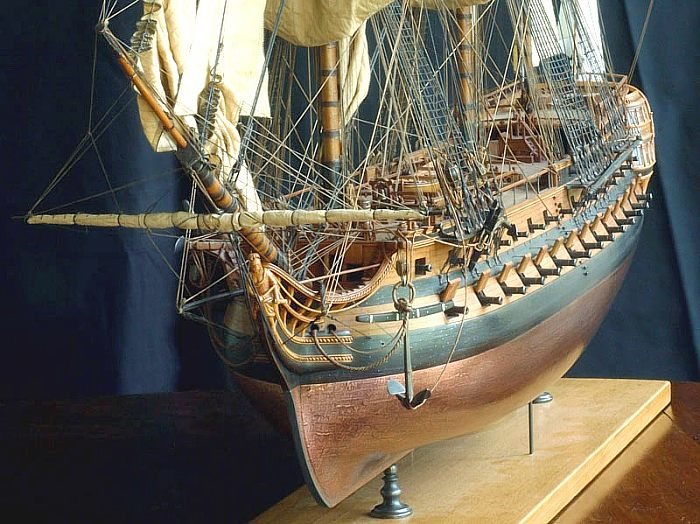
- A 74-gun French ship of the line similar to Magnifique

History

France
- Name: Magnifique
- Builder: Toulon
- Laid down: 1747
- Launched: 7 March 1749
- Fate: Grounded on sandbar off Lovells Island, Boston 1782

General characteristics
- Class & type: Magnifique class ship of the line
- Displacement: 2700 tonneaux
- Tons burthen: 1455 port tonneaux
- Length: 53.6 m (176 ft)
- Beam: 14 m (46 ft)
- Draught: 6.6 m (22 ft)
- Propulsion: Sail
- Complement: 678 men
- Armament: 74 guns

Magnifique was the lead ship of the 3-ship Magnifique class 74-gun ship of the line of the French Navy.

== Career ==
In 1760, Magnifique was under Duchaffault, and patrolled off Martinique, along with Hébé, under La Touche Beauregard.

Captain Brach captained Magnifique at the Battle of Ushant on 27 July 1778, at the Battle of Grenada on 6 July 1779, and at the Battle of Martinique on 17 April 1780.

== Fate ==
On 15 August 1782, Magnifique was wrecked along the rocky shore of Lovells Island, in Boston Harbor, MA, USA. She was rumoured to have been carrying "long-lost treasure." According to a US National Park Service Guide, the submerged vessel is still visible from N 42° 19.902’ W 070° 55.818’ during periods of calm.

On 3 September 1782 the Continental Congress decided to present the ship of the line America to King Louis XVI of France to replace Magnifique. The gift was to symbolize the new nation's "appreciation for France's service to and sacrifices in behalf of the cause of the American patriots".
