= List of islands of Massachusetts =

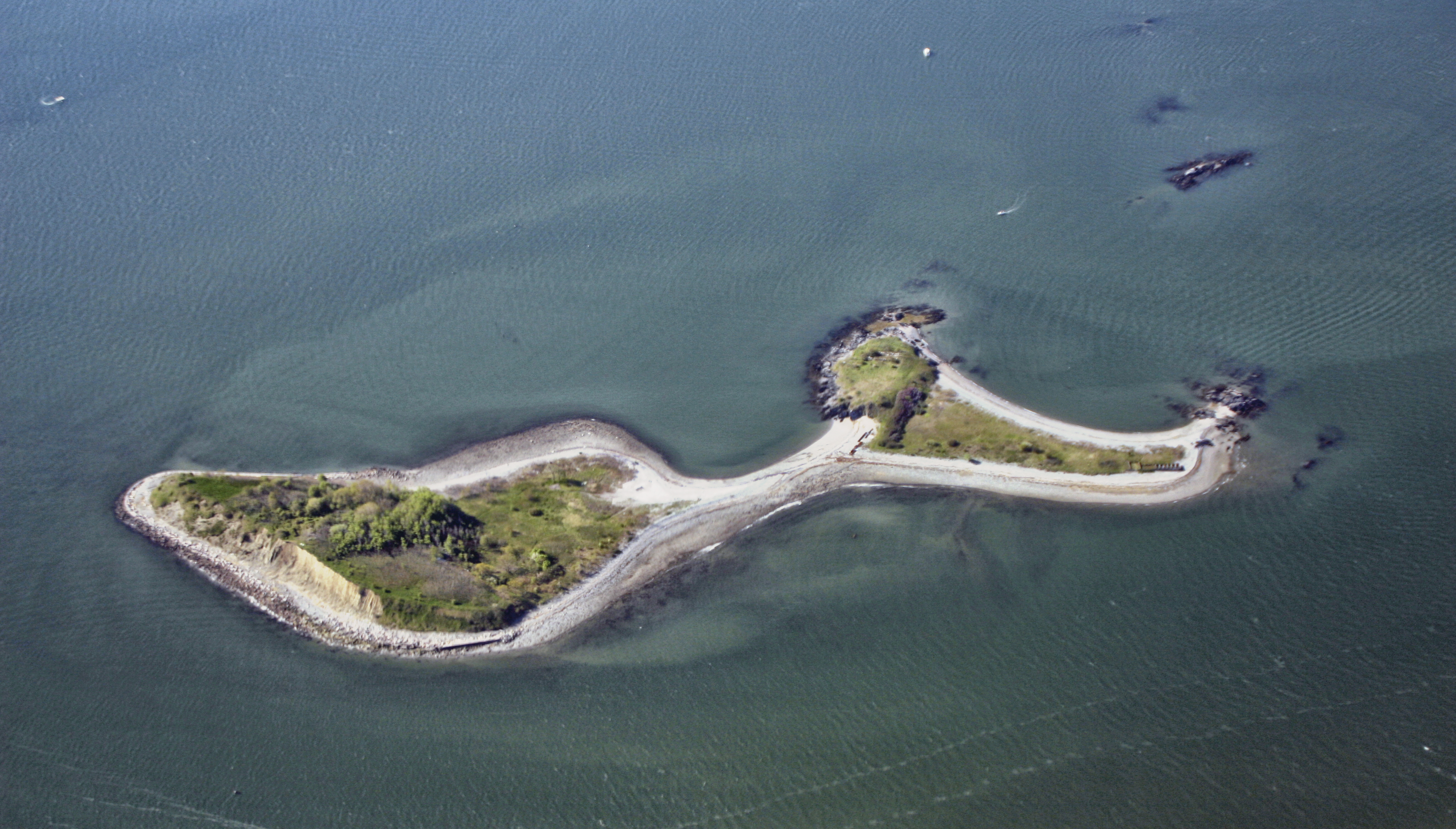
Rainsford Island is part of the Boston Harbor Islands National Recreation Area, a National Recreation Area situated among the islands of Boston Harbor of Boston, Massachusetts

The islands of Massachusetts range from barren, almost completely submerged rocks in Massachusetts Bay (e.g. Abbott Rock, first on the list below) to the large, famous and heavily visited Martha's Vineyard and Nantucket.

The recent history of Massachusetts' islands includes creation by flooding, connection to the mainland and subsumption into new land. Several islands existed as hills in western Worcester County and eastern Hampshire County until the 1930s, when the Swift River was dammed amid controversy to create the Quabbin Reservoir to meet demand for water in the Boston metropolitan area. Castle Island, Deer Island and Nut Island, all in Boston Harbor, have been attached to the mainland and remain islands in name only. Castle and Nut Islands now form the ends of peninsulas due to land reclamation, while Deer Island was attached to Winthrop Peninsula by the New England Hurricane of 1938. Governors Island and Apple Island now constitute the land underneath the runways and tarmacs of Logan International Airport and are included in this list despite their disappearance. Many of the Boston Harbor islands that are located under Logan's flight paths are part of the Boston Harbor Islands National Recreation Area.

Although most of the islands are in or near the Atlantic Ocean, several islands in western Massachusetts are found in the Connecticut River and a few others are surrounded by natural or man made lakes, ponds and wetlands.

Cape Ann, which includes the communities of Gloucester and Rockport, is separated from the mainland by the Annisquam River and the Blynman Canal, effectively forming an island that is connected to the mainland by several bridges, including the Annisquam River Bridge and the Blynman (Cut) Bridge. Gloucester, founded in the early 17th century, is known as America’s oldest seaport and has a long history as a major fishing port.

Name	Municipality	County	Populated?	Terrain	Notes
Abbot Rock	Salem	Essex	uninhabited	barren	minor rock
Abiels Ledge	Wareham	Plymouth	uninhabited	barren	minor rock
Abnecotants Island	Nantucket	Nantucket	uninhabited	barren	minor island / wetland
Alden Island	Duxbury	Plymouth	inhabited?	residence	minor island / wetland
Aldridge Ledge	Boston	Suffolk	uninhabited	barren	minor rock
Alleghany Rock	Tisbury	Dukes	uninhabited	barren	minor rock
Allen Rock	Edgartown	Dukes	uninhabited	barren	minor rock
Allen Rock	Salisbury	Essex	uninhabited	barren	minor rock / wetland
Amrita Island	Bourne	Barnstable	inhabited	residential area	
Angelica Rock	Fairhaven	Bristol	uninhabited	barren	minor island, privately owned
Anuxanon Island	Lakeville	Plymouth	uninhabited	heavily forested	
Apple Island	Boston	Suffolk	uninhabited	commercial use	part of the Logan Int'l Airport complex
Archer Rock	Marblehead	Essex	uninhabited	barren	minor rock
Averills Island	Topsfield	Essex	uninhabited	forested	wetland
Babson Ledge	Gloucester	Essex	uninhabited	barren	minor rock
Bachelor Island	Gosnold	Dukes	uninhabited	barren	minor rock
Badgers Rock	Salisbury	Essex	uninhabited	barren	minor rock
Bagwell Island	Ipswich	Essex	uninhabited	barren	minor island / wetland
Bailey Flat	Westport	Bristol	uninhabited	barren	minor island
Bakers Island	Salem	Essex	inhabited	residential area	isolated community
Bar Rock	Westport	Bristol	uninhabited	barren	minor rock
Bar Rock	Scituate	Plymouth	uninhabited	barren	minor island
Baret Island	Gosnold	Dukes	uninhabited	barren	minor island
Barrel Rock	Cohasset	Norfolk	uninhabited	barren	minor rock
Barstow Rock	Mattapoisett	Plymouth	uninhabited	barren	minor rock
Bartlett Rock	Rockport	Essex	uninhabited	barren	minor rock
Bartlett Rock	Marshfield	Plymouth	uninhabited	barren	minor rock
Bartletts Island	Marshfield	Plymouth	inhabited	residential area	wetland
Barton Island	Gill	Franklin	uninhabited	forested	minor island
Bass Ledge	Nantucket	Nantucket	uninhabited	barren	minor rock
Bass Rock	Ipswich	Essex	uninhabited	barren	minor rock
Bass Rock	Nahant	Essex	uninhabited	barren	minor rock
Bass Rock	Quincy/Weymouth	Norfolk	uninhabited	barren	minor rock
Bassetts Island	Bourne	Barnstable	inhabited	residential area	isolated community
Bates Island	Webster	Worcester	uninhabited	forested	minor island
Bates Rock	Scituate	Plymouth	uninhabited	barren	minor rock
Bear Island	Foxborough	Norfolk	inhabited?	residence?	isolated (residence?)
Bear Island	Scituate	Plymouth	uninhabited	heavily forested	minor island
Bearse Rock	Barnstable	Barnstable	uninhabited	barren	minor rock
Beaver Island	Rowe	Franklin	uninhabited	heavily forested	
Bemo Ledge	Gloucester	Essex	uninhabited	barren	minor rock
Bench Rock	Barnstable	Barnstable	uninhabited	barren	minor rock
Bents Ledge	Dartmouth	Bristol	uninhabited	barren	minor rock
Big Pine Island	Westport	Bristol	uninhabited	forested?	
Big Quamino Rock	Cohasset	Norfolk	uninhabited	barren	mid-size rock
Big Ram Island	Westport	Bristol	uninhabited	barren	wetland
Big Rock	Tisbury	Dukes	uninhabited	barren	minor rock
Billingsgate Island	Wellfleet	Barnstable	uninhabited	barren	abandoned settlement
Bird Island	Marion	Plymouth	uninhabited	barren	minor island / has tower structure
Black Rock	Fairhaven	Bristol	uninhabited	barren	minor island / has beacon structure
Black Rock	Nahant	Essex	uninhabited	barren	minor rock
Black Rock	Beverly	Essex	uninhabited	barren	minor rock
Black Rock	Gloucester	Essex	uninhabited	barren	minor rock / wetland
Black Rock	Gloucester	Essex	uninhabited	barren	minor rock
Black Rock	Boston	Suffolk	uninhabited	barren	minor rock
Blind Rock	Barnstable	Barnstable	uninhabited	barren	minor rock
Blue Fish Rock	Marshfield	Plymouth	uninhabited	barren	minor rock
Blueberry Island	Winchendon	Worcester	inhabited	residential area	
Boohoo Ledge	Manchester-by-the-Sea	Essex	uninhabited	barren	minor rock
Boston Harbor Islands National Recreation Area	(Boston Harbor)	Suffolk	inhabited	National Recreation Area	U.S. Coast Guard station / compilation of islands
Boutwell Island	Groton	Middlesex	uninhabited	state forest	J Harry Rich State Forest
Boynton Island	Gloucester	Essex	inhabited?	residence?	wetland
Brace Rock	Gloucester	Essex	uninhabited	barren	large rock
Brant Island	Mattapoisett	Plymouth	inhabited	residential area	
Brant Rock	Marshfield	Plymouth	uninhabited	barren	large rock
Briggs Rock	Westport	Bristol	uninhabited	barren	minor rock
Brimbles	Salem	Essex	uninhabited	barren	minor rocks
Brooklyn Rock	Fairhaven	Bristol	uninhabited	barren	minor rock
Brown Island	Marblehead	Essex	abandoned	private conservation land (Trustees of Reservations)	
Browns Island	Newbury	Essex	uninhabited	barren	minor island / wetland
Brush Island	Oak Bluffs	Dukes	uninhabited	barren	minor island
Brush Island	Cohasset	Norfolk	uninhabited	barren	minor island
*Buck Rock	Manchester-by-the-Sea	Essex	uninhabited	barren	minor rock
Buckthorn Rock	Cohasset	Norfolk	uninhabited	barren	minor rock
Bull Island	Gosnold	Dukes	inhabited?	residence?	
Bull Island	Essex	Essex	uninhabited	barren	minor island / wetland
Bumpkin Island	Hingham	Plymouth	inhabited?	state park	ruins / Boston Harbor Islands National Recreation Area
Burnham Rocks	Gloucester?	Essex	uninhabited	barren	minor rocks
Button Island	Hingham		uninhabited	forested	minor island / Boston Harbor Islands National Recreation Area
Calf Island	Boston		uninhabited	state park	ruins / Boston Harbor Islands National Recreation Area
Calf Islands	Boston		uninhabited	state park	ruins / compilation of islands / Boston Harbor Islands National Recreation Area
Canary Island	Hatfield		uninhabited	heavily forested	
Canoe Rock	Westport	Bristol	uninhabited	barren	minor rock
Cape Cod	Barnstable	Barnstable	inhabited	thickly settled towns and villages, heavily forested, wetlands	forested, minor and major rock
Carr Island	Salisbury	Essex	uninhabited	wetland	State Wildlife Management Area
Carrick Island	Petersham		uninhabited	forested	
Castle Rock	Nahant	Essex	uninhabited	barren	mid-size rock
Caswell Rock	Marblehead	Essex	uninhabited	barren	minor rock
Cataumet Rock	Falmouth		uninhabited	barren	minor rock
Cedar Island	Dartmouth		uninhabited	heavily forested	minor island / wetland
Cedar Island	Gosnold	Dukes	uninhabited	barren	minor island
Cedar Island	Wareham		uninhabited	barren	minor island
Cemetery Island	Clinton		uninhabited	heavily forested	
Chaces Island	Newbury/Newburyport		uninhabited	barren	
Channel Rock	Barnstable	Barnstable	uninhabited	barren	minor rock
Channel Rock	(Nantucket Sound)		uninhabited	barren	minor rock
Chapman Island	Petersham		uninhabited	barren	
Chappaquiddick Island	Edgartown	Dukes	inhabited	residential area	large island
Checkerberry Island	Webster	Worcester	uninhabited	barren	minor rock
Children's Island	Salem	Essex	inhabited	Summer Camp, property of YMCA	
Childs Island	Medfield		uninhabited	heavily forested	minor island / wetland
Chittenden Rock	Cohasset	Norfolk	uninhabited	barren	minor rock
Choate Island	Essex				
Chubb Island	Beverly		uninhabited	barren	mid-size rock
Church Rock	Barnstable	Barnstable	uninhabited	barren	minor rock
Church Rock	New Bedford		uninhabited	barren	minor rock
Clapps Island	Marion	Plymouth	uninhabited	barren	minor island
Clark Island	Otis/Tolland		uninhabited	state forest	Tolland State Forest
Clark's Island	Plymouth		inhabited	residential area	
Cleveland East Ledge	Falmouth		location of Cleveland East Ledge Light	barren	minor rock
Cleveland Island	Mashpee	Barnstable	uninhabited	heavily forested	minor island
Cleveland Ledge	Mattapoisett	Plymouth	uninhabited	barren	minor rock
Cobble Island	Webster	Worcester	inhabited	residence	isolated residence
Coffin Rock	Falmouth	Barnstable	uninhabited	barren	minor rock
Commissioners Ledge	Boston	Suffolk	uninhabited	barren	minor rock
Common Island	Duxbury		uninhabited	barren	minor island / wetland
Cone Rock	Barnstable	Barnstable	uninhabited	barren	minor rock
Coney Island	Salem	Essex	abandoned	light growth, small salt marsh	minor island
Coney Island Rock	Salem	Essex	uninhabited	barren	minor rock
Conspiracy Island	Berkley		uninhabited	light growth	minor island
Cooks Island	Kingston		uninhabited	barren	minor island
Cormorant Rock	Salem	Essex	uninhabited	barren	mid-size rock
Cormorant Rock	Mattapoisett		uninhabited	barren	has beacon / minor island
Corn Island	Essex	Essex	uninhabited	forested	minor island / wetland
Corys Island	Westport	Bristol	uninhabited	barren	
Cove Ledge	Manchester-by-the-Sea	Essex	uninhabited	barren	minor rock
Crescent Island	Foxborough	Norfolk	uninhabited	heavily forested	minor island
Cross Farm Hill	Ipswich	Essex	uninhabited	barren	minor island / wetland
Cross Island	Essex	Essex	inhabited	residential area	wetland / privately owned
Crow Island	Fairhaven	Bristol	inhabited	residence	minor island
Crow Island Rock	Manchester-by-the-Sea	Essex	uninhabited	barren	minor rock
Crowninshield Island	Marblehead	Essex	abandoned	small pine forest	Trustees of Reservations property
Cunningham Ledge	Boylston		uninhabited		minor island
Cuttyhunk Island	Gosnold	Dukes	inhabited	residential area	large island
Dartmouth Rock	Dartmouth		uninhabited	barren	minor rock
David Rock	Gloucester	Essex	uninhabited	barren	
Davids Island	Weymouth		uninhabited	barren	minor rock
Davis Neck					
Dead Neck	Barnstable	Barnstable	uninhabited	barren	
Dean Island	Essex	Essex	uninhabited	forested	minor island / wetland
Decatur Rock	New Bedford		uninhabited	barren	minor rock
Deer Island	Amesbury		inhabited?	commercial use?	minor island
Deer Island	Boston Harbor		uninhabited		Boston Harbor Islands National Recreation Area
Den Hill Island					
Devils Foot Island	Falmouth		uninhabited	barren	minor island
Devilsfoot Island	Medfield		uninhabited	forested	minor island / wetland
Dighton Rock	Berkley		uninhabited	state park	minor rock / Dighton Rock State Park / Massachusetts' (official) state explorer rock
Dilly Island	Essex	Essex	uninhabited	barren	minor island / wetland
Dodge Rock	Rockport	Essex	uninhabited	barren	minor rock
Dogfish Ledge	Westport	Bristol	uninhabited	barren	minor rock
Dole Island	Newbury		uninhabited	nat. wildlife refuge	minor island / wetland / Parker River National Wildlife Refuge
Dolphin Rock	Swampscott		uninhabited	barren	minor rock
Dread Ledge	Swampscott		uninhabited	barren	minor rock
Dry Salvages	Rockport	Essex	uninhabited	barren	compilation of islands
Duck Island	Barnstable	Barnstable	uninhabited	barren	minor island / wetland
E Island	Newton	Middlesex	uninhabited	forested	minor island / wetland
Eagle Island	Salem	Essex	uninhabited	light growth	minor island
Egg Rock	Nahant	Essex	uninhabited	very light growth	major rock
Elizabeth Island	Arlington	Middlesex	uninhabited	forested	minor island
Fish Island	New Bedford				
Fox Island	Waltham	Middlesex	uninhabited	forested	minor island
Gallops Island	Boston	Suffolk			Boston Harbor Islands National Recreation Area
Gerry Island	Marblehead	Essex			
Georges Island	Boston	Suffolk			Boston Harbor Islands National Recreation Area
Gooseberry Island	Salem	Essex	uninhabited	light growth	minor island
Governors Island	Boston	Suffolk			
Grape Island	Weymouth				Boston Harbor Islands National Recreation Area
Great Bank					
Great Brewster Island	Boston	Suffolk			Boston Harbor Islands National Recreation Area
Great Egg Island					
Great Flat					
Great Island	Wellfleet	Barnstable	uninhabited		Great Island Trail
Great Misery Island	Salem	Essex	uninhabited/abandoned	nature preserve (Trustees of Reservations)	minor island
Green Island	Boston	Suffolk			Boston Harbor Islands National Recreation Area
Gull Island	Gosnold	Dukes			
Gunning Island	Westport	Bristol			
Hales Island	Haverhill				
Halfmoon Flat	Westport	Bristol			
Halfway Pond Island	Plymouth		uninhabited?	research natural area (The Nature Conservancy in Massachusetts)	minor island
Hangman Island	Quincy	Norfolk			Boston Harbor Islands National Recreation Area
Hog Island	Essex	Essex	uninhabited?	spruce forest, wetlands	location site for The Crucible (1996 film)
Holy Island	Ipswich	Essex			
House Island	Manchester-by-the-Sea	Essex			
Kettle Island	Manchester-by-the-Sea	Essex			
Langlee Island	Hingham				Boston Harbor Islands National Recreation Area
Little Brewster Island	Hull				Boston Harbor Islands National Recreation Area
Little Calf Island	Hull				Boston Harbor Islands National Recreation Area
Little Island					
Little Misery Island	Salem	Essex			
Little Quabbin Island					
Little Ram Island					
Little Salvages					
Long Beach Rock					
Long Island	Boston	Suffolk			Boston Harbor Islands National Recreation Area
Lovell's Island	Boston	Suffolk			Boston Harbor Islands National Recreation Area
Marblehead Rock			uninhabited	large rock	
Martha's Vineyard	Aquinnah, Chilmark, Edgartown, Oak Bluffs, Tisbury, West Tisbury	Dukes	inhabited year round	residential/commercial	Well-developed summer attraction
Middle Brewster Island	Boston	Suffolk			Boston Harbor Islands National Recreation Area
Middle Ground					
Milk Island	Rockport	Essex			
Monomoy Island	Chatham				
Monohamsett Island					
Moon Island	Quincy	Norfolk	uninhabited	training facilities	Boston Harbor Islands National Recreation Area
Morris Island					
Mount Zion Island	Petersham		uninhabited	forested	in Quabbin Reservoir; access not permitted
Muskeget Island	Nantucket	Nantucket	uninhabited	dunes, marsh	2 buildings; inaccessible by most boats
Nantucket	Nantucket	Nantucket	inhabited year round	residential, commercial	Well-developed tourist attraction
Nashawena Island	Gosnold	Dukes	inhabited year round		Privately owned
Naushon Island	Gosnold	Dukes	inhabited year round		Privately owned
Newton Island	Southborough				
Nixes Mate	Boston Harbor		uninhabited	granite rock	navigation aid / Boston Harbor Islands National Recreation Area
Nomans Land	Chilmark				
Nonamesset Island	Gosnold	Dukes			
Nut Island	Quincy	Norfolk			Boston Harbor Islands National Recreation Area
Onset Island	Wareham				
Osterville Grand Island	Barnstable	Barnstable			
Outer Brewster Island	Hull				Boston Harbor Islands National Recreation Area
Palmers Island					
Park Island					
Parker Hill Island					
Pasque Island	Gosnold	Dukes			
Peddocks Island	Boston Harbor	Suffolk	inhabited	ruins	Boston Harbor Islands National Recreation Area
Penikese Island	Gosnold	Dukes			
Pierce Island					
Pine Island					
Plum Island	Newburyport, Newbury, Ipswich, and Rowley	Essex	inhabited	residential, commercial and wildlife sanctuary	Plum Island State Park at southern tip
Popes Island					
Popponesset Island	Mashpee				
Prince Head					
Raccoon Island	Boston Harbor	Suffolk	uninhabited	gravel/rock	Boston Harbor Islands National Recreation Area
Ragged Island	Hingham		uninhabited	plants/trees	Boston Harbor Islands National Recreation Area
Rainsford Island	Boston	Suffolk			Boston Harbor Islands National Recreation Area
Ram Island	Salisbury	Essex	uninhabited	wetlands and trees	State Wildlife Management Area
Roger Island					
Round Island	Hull				
Sampsons Island	Barnstable	Barnstable	uninhabited	scrub pine, oak, sand, marsh	Mass. Audubon wildlife sanctuary
Sanford Flat	Westport	Bristol			
Sarah Island	Hingham				Boston Harbor Islands National Recreation Area
Sea Ledge					
Seal Island	Mattapoisett				
Seal Island	Newbury				
Seymour Island	Plymouth (in Billington Sea)		uninhabited?	forested	minor island
Shag Rocks	Boston				Boston Harbor Islands National Recreation Area
Sheep Island	Weymouth				Boston Harbor Islands National Recreation Area
Sipson Island	Orleans		inhabited		Pleasant Bay, Cape Cod, private
Sipson Meadow					
Slate Island	Weymouth				Boston Harbor Islands National Recreation Area
Snake Island	Winthrop				Boston Harbor Islands National Recreation Area
Southworth Island	Petersham				
Spectacle Island	Boston				Boston Harbor Islands National Recreation Area
Spinnaker Island	Hull				
Stall Hill Island	Taunton				
Stevens Island	Petersham				
Straitsmouth Island	Rockport	Essex	location of Straitsmouth Island Light		
Strong Island	Chatham				
Tenpound Island	Gloucester	Essex			
Tern Island	Chatham				
Thacher Island	Rockport	Essex			
The Graves	unincorporated area		inhabited	barren	major rock / privately owned / aid to navigation / Boston Harbor Islands National Recreation Area
Thimble Island	Boston		uninhabited	barren	Rock outcrop in the Dorchester Bay is the middle shaft of the old sewer tunnel under Dorchester Bay between Moon Island and Columbia Point
Thompson Island	Boston		uninhabited, used by Outward Bound	forested, marshland	Boston Harbor Islands National Recreation Area
Tilden Island	Marshfield	Plymouth			
Tinker's Island	Salem	Essex	inhabited	sparse growth	
Tobys Island	Bourne	Barnstable			
Tuckernuck Island	Nantucket		yes, summer	scrub oak/heath	~35 houses, no roads or electricity
Uncatena Island	Gosnold	Dukes			
Veckatimest Island	Gosnold				
Walker Hill Island	Hardwick				
Washburn Island	Falmouth	Barnstable			
Weepecket Islands	Gosnold	Dukes			
West Island	Fairhaven	Bristol			
Whites Flat	Westport	Bristol			
Wickets Island	Wareham				
Woodbridge Island	Newburyport				
