= Clark Island =

Clark Island or Clarke Island may refer to:

== Australia ==
- Clark Island (New South Wales), an island in Sydney Harbour
- Clarke Island (Tasmania), an island of the Furneaux Group between Tasmania and mainland Australia

== North America ==
- Clark Island (Massachusetts)
- Clark Island (Nunavut)
- Clark Island (Washington), one of the San Juan Islands of Washington State
- Clark's Island in Plymouth, Massachusetts

== Elsewhere ==
- Clark Island (Antarctica)
