= Corn Island (disambiguation) =

Corn Island refers to the municipality of the Corn Islands, two islands off Nicaragua, and Great Corn Island, one of these islands.

Corn Island may also refer to:

- Corn Island (film), a 2014 Georgian film
- Corn Island (Kentucky), a former island in the Ohio River, Ky, U.S.
- Corn Island (Massachusetts), an island in Essex Country, Mass, U.S.
