= Onset Island (Massachusetts) =

Island in the United States of America

- Location within Massachusetts

Geography
- Coordinates: 41.7334384°N 70.6425322°W
- Area: 0.01875 sq mi (0.0486 km^{2})
- Length: 0.2 mi (0.3 km)
- Highest elevation: 16 ft (4.9 m)

Administration
- United States
- State: Massachusetts
- Municipality: Wareham

Onset Island is a small, private association owned island located at the western end of the Cape Cod Canal in the Town of Wareham, near Onset, Massachusetts. No part of this private island is accessible to the general public without prior permission from a homeowner.

One must be a homeowner, a guest of a homeowner, or someone who has rented a cottage from a homeowner to visit the island. Onset Island is only accessible via a small number of registered private boats owned by the island's homeowners. Use of the island's private docks is limited to those who have paid the relevant association fees, or by private agreement.

Approximately fifty families have homes on the island.

== See also ==
- Wickets Island
- List of islands of Massachusetts
