= Bird Island (Massachusetts) =

Island in Plymouth County, Massachusetts, United States

Coordinates: 41°40′10″N 70°43′02″W

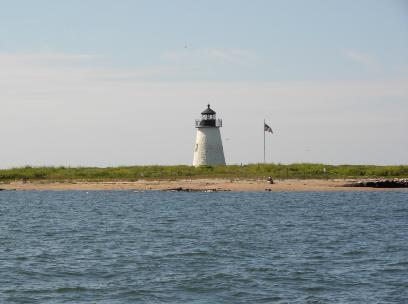
Bird Island, Buzzards Bay

Bird Island is a tiny island in Buzzards Bay at the mouth of Sippican Harbor, less than a mile off the mainland coast of the town of Marion, Massachusetts, United States.

== Landmarks ==
The only landmarks on Bird Island are a flagpole and a historic 36-foot-high (11 m) lighthouse. Bird Island Light was formerly staffed but now runs automatically. The Great New England Hurricane caused widespread destruction all along the south coast of New England. High tide in the evening of September 21, 1938, was 14 feet (4.3 m) above normal. The great storm swept away every building on Bird Island except the lighthouse tower.

== Flora and fauna ==
Bird Island is notable as a sanctuary and major breeding ground of the roseate tern, a bird from which the island gained its name.

== See also ==
- Islands of Massachusetts

== Sources ==
- Every Day Life in the Massachusetts Bay Colony by George Francis Dow
- The Standard Times newspaper of New Bedford Massachusetts.
- Rhode Island, Massachusetts & New Hampshire Maptech Embassy Guide, ISBN 0-7436-0617-5
