= Crowninshield =

Crowninshield may refer to the following:

- Crowninshield family, long-standing American family
- USS Crowninshield, a World War I era American destroyer
- Crowninshield Island, a small island off the coast of Salem, Massachusetts
