= Hales Island =

Hales Island may refer to:

- Hales Island (Massachusetts), in the United States
- Hales Island (Queensland), in Australia
