= Blueberry (disambiguation) =

A blueberry is a flowering plant and its fruit.

Blueberry may also refer to:

== Science ==
- Blueberry (Cannabis), a strain of cannabis
- Martian blueberry, Martian spherules discovered by the Mars rover

== Entertainment ==
- Blueberry (comics), a series of French graphic novels
- Blueberry (film), a 2004 film loosely based on the series
- "Blueberry", a 1988 song by Lita Ford from Lita
- "Blueberry", a 2009 song by Late of the Pier

== Places ==
- Blueberry Hill (disambiguation)
- Blueberry Island (disambiguation)
- Blueberry River (disambiguation)
- Blueberry Township, Wadena County, Minnesota, United States
- Blueberry, Wisconsin, an unincorporated community in the United States

== See also ==
- European blueberry or bilberry, several species related to blueberry
- Berry Blue (disambiguation)
- Bilberry (disambiguation)
