= Bilberry (disambiguation) =

Bilberry may also refer to:

- Bilberry, Cornwall, UK
- Bilberry Hill, Worcestershire, UK
- Bilberry or European blueberry, plants in the genus Vaccinium, bearing small, edible, dark-blue berries.
- Bilberry goat, breed of feral goat
- Amelanchier canadensis, common names include bilberry and Canadian serviceberry

== See also ==
- Blueberry (disambiguation)
- Blåbärssoppa, Scandinavian bilberry soup
- Bilberry soup (disambiguation)
