= Noddle's Island =

Former island in Boston, Massachusetts, United States

Coordinates: 42.379°N 71.035°W

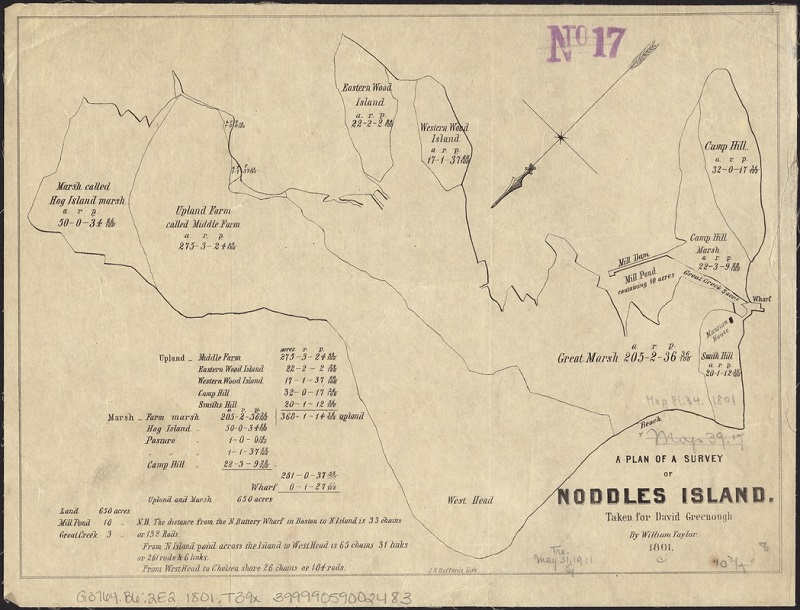
1801 Survey of Noddles Island, Boston Harbor, Massachusetts by William Taylor

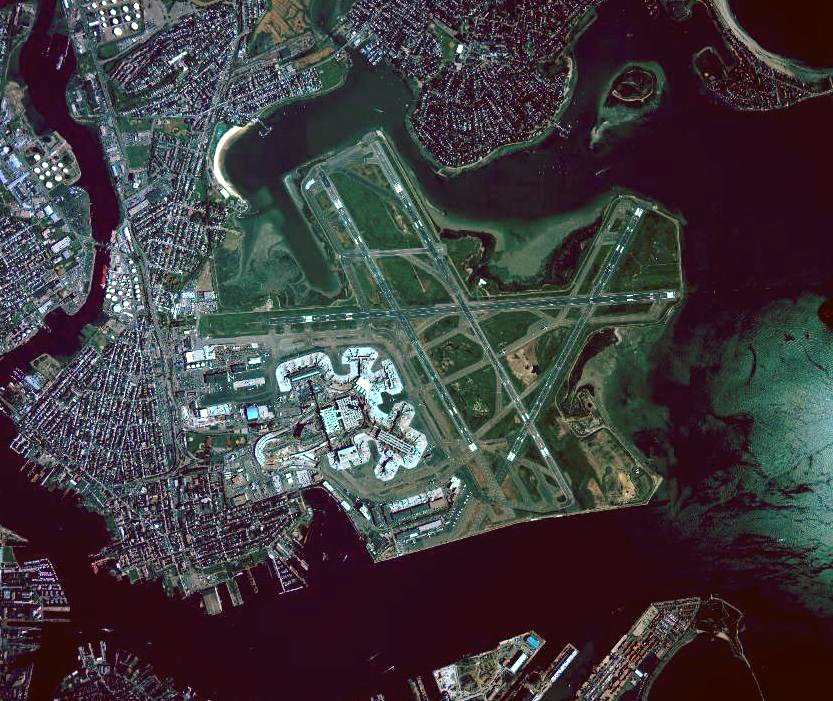
The former Noddle's Island lies immediately to the left (west) of Logan Airport in this image.

Noddle's Island was historically one of the Boston Harbor Islands of Boston, Massachusetts. Most of the original land of Noddle's Island now makes up the southern part of the neighborhood of East Boston; it is now part of the mainland since the strait connecting Noddle's Island to Hog Island and that connecting Hog Island to the mainland city of Revere were filled in the early 20th century. The original contours of Noddle's Island were also greatly obscured by the 20th-century construction of Logan International Airport, which filled the tidal flats between Noddle's Island and Governor's, Bird, and Apple islands to its east. In some sources it is spelled "Noodle's Island".

== History ==
For over three hundred years, the island was known as Noddle's Island, for William Noddle, who was probably sent out by John Brereton, and settled upon it in the 1620s, before Boston was established by the Puritans. The island was used for grazing livestock and there was a fortified structure on the island. Mr. Noddle, a resident of Salem, died in 1632 when his canoe overturned on the South River, according to the journal of John Winthrop.

Sometime in the late 1620s or early 1630s, Rev. Samuel Maverick, an Anglican clergyman, became the owner of the island through his wife's inheritance. Maverick was reputed to be New-England's first slaveowner, following a 1638 purchase from a Captain Pierce of the Tortugas. The First Baptist Church of Boston met secretly on the island in the 17th century to avoid persecution by the Puritan state.

Royal Navy ships at Boston during the 1770s began obtained drinking water from springs on Noodle Island. All fresh water needed to be purchased and it was chosen as the most convenient fresh water spring because it only became salinated "at the height of spring tides when saltwater at times will break in upon the fresh spring" wrote Rear Admiral John Montagu, Boston, May 26, 1772. It was also more easily accessible in winter when the harbour froze and as Captain Samuel Hood, former North Americas C-in-C (1767-70) reported to Montagu, the water won't crack the pease if good [pease being a staple of Royal Navy rations].

During the American Revolutionary War "on this same island was fought the second battle of the Revolution (also known as the Battle of Chelsea Creek), and the first in which the American artillery was used." After the British left Boston harbor, the island was used as a hospital for the French Fleet in 1780 who dubbed it ""L'ile de France'" and buried numerous troops on the island. Following this the island was heavily fortified by the Bostonians with an earthwork known as "Noddle's Island Fort", a rebuilding of a 19-gun British work, later rebuilt and renamed Fort Strong in the War of 1812 after Governor Caleb Strong.

== See also ==
- Logan International Airport
