= Blueberry Island =

Blueberry Island may refer to:

- Blueberry Island (Quebec), an island in Quebec's Lac Marois
- Blueberry Island (Massachusetts), an island in Massachusetts
