= Berry Blue =

Berry Blue may refer to:

- Berry Blue, a flavor of Jell-O
- Berry Blue, a flavor of Pebbles cereal
- Berry Blue, a flavor of Fanta
- Berry Blue, a flavor of Jelly Belly
- Berry Blue, a former flavor of Kool-Aid

== See also ==
- Berry Blue Blast, a flavor of Go-Gurt
- Berry Blue Typhoon, a flavor of Hawaiian Punch
- Blueberry (disambiguation)
- Barry Blue
