= Blueberry River =

Blueberry River may refer to:

- Blueberry River (Minnesota)
- Blueberry River (British Columbia)
  - Blueberry River Indian Reserve No. 205, British Columbia
- the Blaeberry River in British Columbia is sometimes referred to as the Blueberry River

== See also ==
- Blueberry (disambiguation)
