= Apple Island (Massachusetts) =

Island in Massachusetts

Coordinates: 42°21′30″N 70°59′28″W

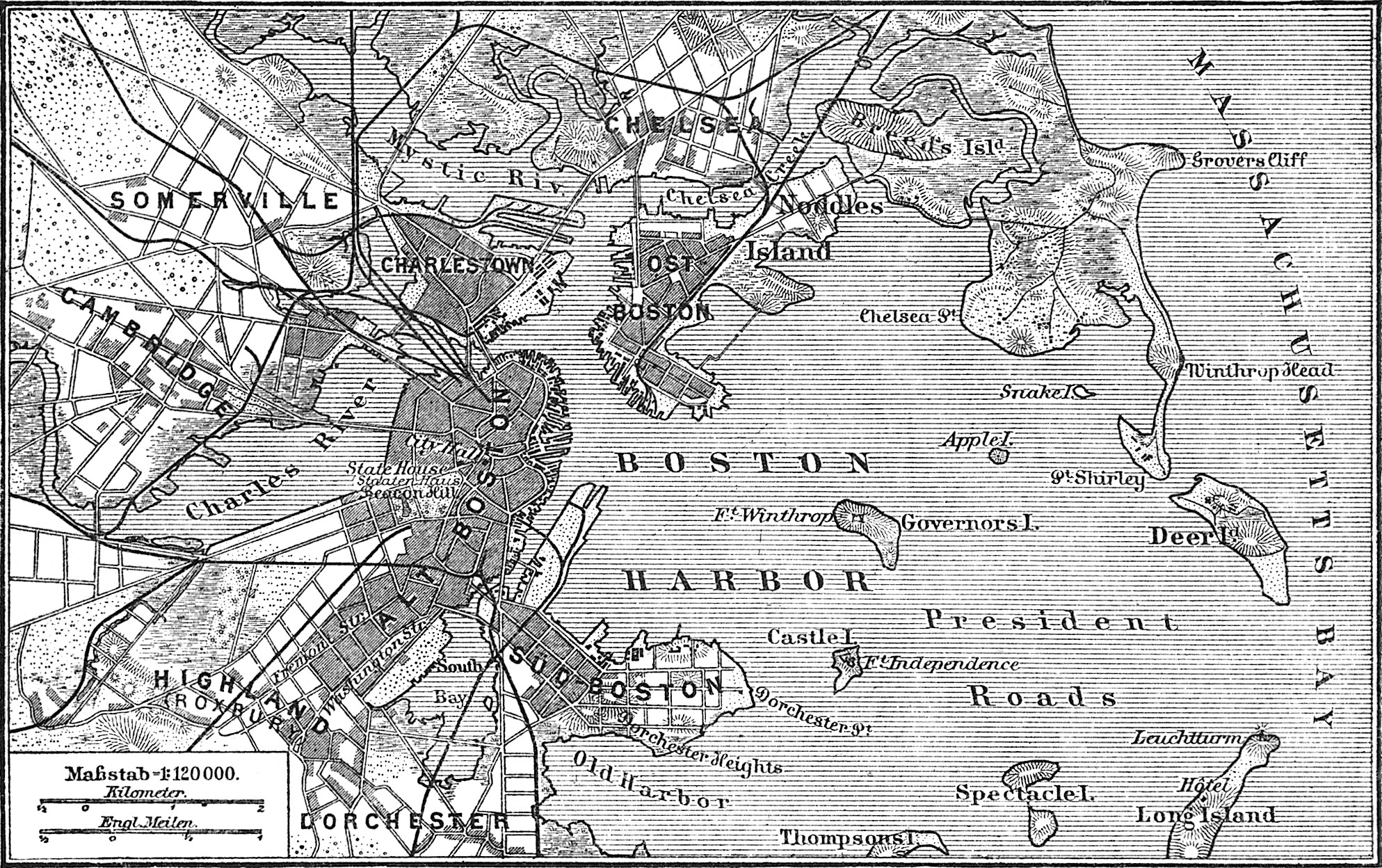
1890 map of Boston Harbor showing Apple Island before the airport was built.

Apple Island was an island in Boston Harbor in Massachusetts, one of five islands that were integrated with landfill over the years to form East Boston and Logan International Airport. Noddle's Island, Hog Island, Bird's Island and Governor's Island were the others.

== History ==
Distinguished in its early years by waving elms but hard to access because of its expansive flats at low tide, the 10-acre (4 ha) Apple Island was initially part of the town of Boston, used for sheep and cattle grazing. It fell into the private hands of Thomas Hutchinson, father of Royal Governor Thomas Hutchinson, in 1723. Hutchinson the elder willed the island to an English mariner in 1802, and a gentleman named Mr. Marsh purchased it for $550 in 1822. Marsh died in 1833 and was buried on the island's western slope, and his home burned down two years later.

Abandoned for years, Apple Island was reacquired by the City of Boston in 1867 and sold to private citizens. Inhabitants were known to haul wrecked steamships onto the island and burn them for their copper and iron parts. These ships included the James Adger, the Baltic (the last steamship in the Collins line), and the Ontario, built in Newburyport for the transatlantic trade.

== Airport incorporation ==
In the 1940s, Apple Island was subsumed into land reclamation for the extension of Boston Airport, which added 1,800 acres (730 ha) of landfill in Boston Harbor, taken from Apple, Governor's and Noddle's Islands. In 1943 the state renamed the airport as General Edward Lawrence Logan International Airport after a Spanish–American War officer from South Boston.
