= Childs Island (Massachusetts) =

Island in Norfolk County, Massachusetts, United States

Coordinates: 42.16704°N 71.30506°W

Childs Island is a small heavily forested island located north of the Stop River in the wetlands of Medfield Rhododendrons in Medfield, Massachusetts.
