= Chubb Island (Massachusetts) =

Island in Essex County, Massachusetts, United States

Coordinates: 42°33′37″N 70°47′50″W

Chubb Island is a small barren island located in Manchester Bay in Beverly, Massachusetts.
