= Bird Island Light =

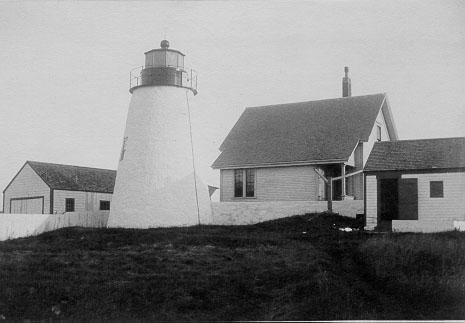
- Location: Sippican Harbor, Marion, Massachusetts
- Coordinates: 41°40′9.5″N 70°43′2.4″W

Tower
- Constructed: 1819
- Foundation: Surface rock
- Construction: Rubble stone
- Automated: 1997
- Height: 9.5 m (31 ft)
- Shape: Conical
- Markings: White
- Heritage: National Register of Historic Places listed place
- Fog signal: Original, pyramidal bell tower, none now

Light
- First lit: 1819
- Deactivated: 1933-1997
- Focal height: 37 feet (11 m)
- Lens: Fourth order Fresnel lens (original); ML-300 (current)
- Characteristic: Fl W 6s
- Bird Island Light
- U.S. National Register of Historic Places
- Area: 3 acres (1.2 ha)
- Built: 1819
- MPS: Lighthouses of Massachusetts TR
- NRHP reference No.: 87002030
- Added to NRHP: September 28, 1987

Bird Island Light is a historic lighthouse at the entrance to Sippican Harbor in Marion, Massachusetts. Built in 1819, its tower is a well-preserved example of an early 19th-century masonry lighthouse. The tower and the island on which it stands were added to the National Register of Historic Places as Bird Island Light on September 28, 1987.

== Description and history ==
Sippican Harbor is a deep inlet off Buzzards Bay on the south coast of Massachusetts, which is bracketed by Converse Point on the west and Butler Point on the east, both part of the town of Marion. About 0.5 miles (0.80 km) south of Butler Point lies Bird Island, a 3-acre (1.2 ha) point of land that mostly serves as a bird nesting site. The Bird Island lighthouse stands near the island's center. It is a circular masonry structure about 25 feet (7.6 m), with its light at 37 feet (11 m) above sea level. The tower is topped by a cast iron lantern house, with an outside railing and conical roof with ventilator.

The tower was built when the light was first established in 1819, and was accompanied by an attached stone keeper's dwelling. Three months after it was first lit, with William Moore as the keeper, it was badly damaged by a storm. It was again severely damaged on September 8, 1869, and, again, repaired. It was deactivated by the USCG in 1933. All of the buildings except the tower were destroyed in the New England Hurricane of 1938. In 1940 the island passed into private hands and was acquired by the Town of Marion in 1966. The light was briefly lit in 1976 after undergoing restoration by the local historical society. The Bird Island Preservation Society was formed in 1994 and on July 4, 1997, the light was relit as a private aid to navigation.

The island, but not the tower, is open to visitors except during the May through August nesting season of the endangered roseate tern.

== See also ==
- National Register of Historic Places listings in Plymouth County, Massachusetts
