= Carrick Island =

Island in the eastern United States

Coordinates: 42°24′56″N 72°17′16″W

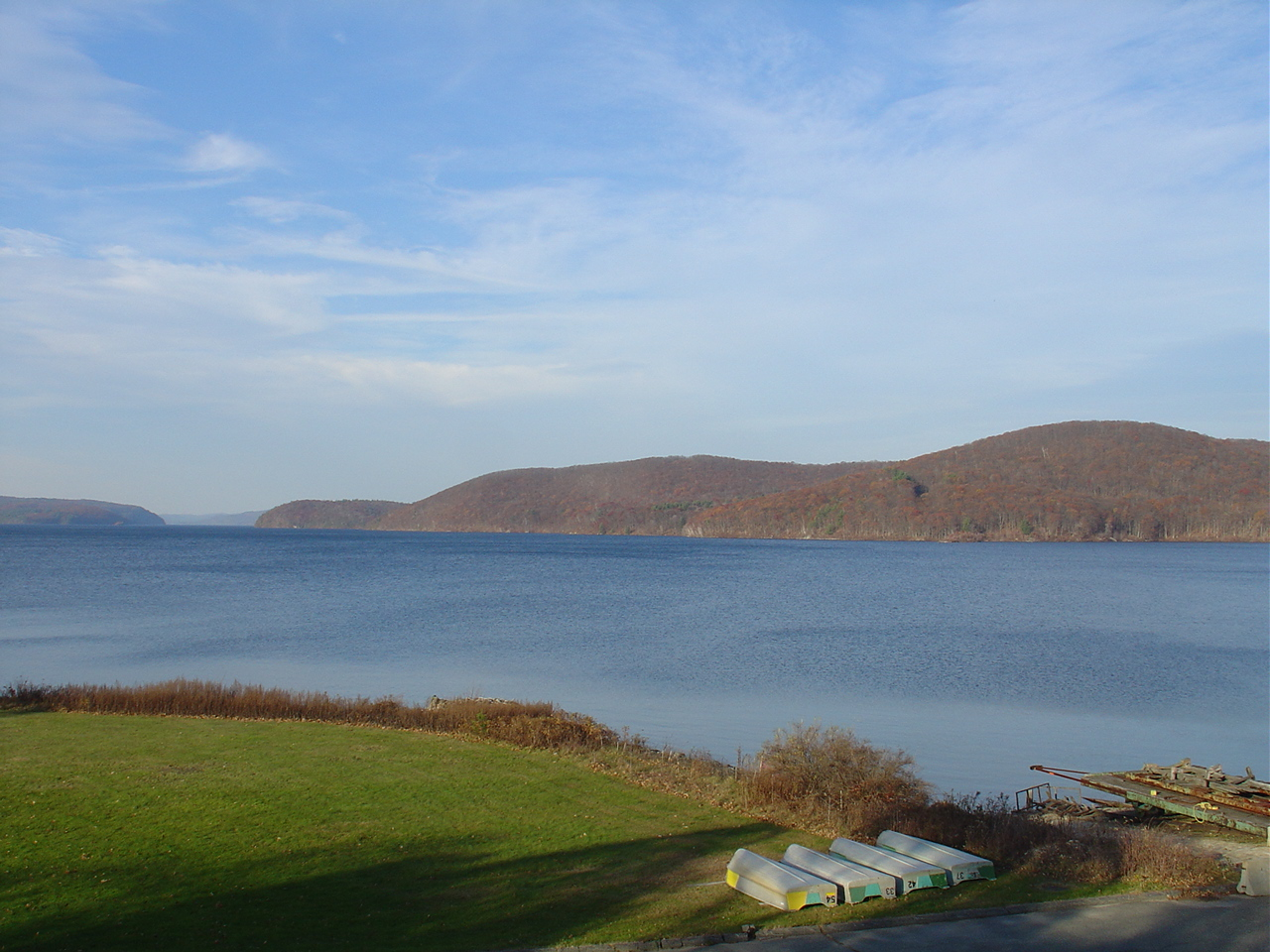
Quabbin Reservoir

Carrick Island is a small island in the Quabbin Reservoir in Massachusetts, roughly 600 feet (180 m) by 300 feet (91 m). It is part of the Town of Petersham, in Worcester County. The island lies just west of the much larger Mount Zion Island, the largest island in the reservoir. It serves as both a cultural and historic feature.
