= Cemetery Island (Massachusetts) =

Island in Worcester County, Massachusetts, US

Coordinates: 42°24′00″N 71°42′48″W

Cemetery Island is a heavily forested island located in the Wachusett Reservoir in Clinton, Massachusetts. The island's name came from its being part of an old burial ground that was flooded by the creation of the reservoir; 3,816 bodies were removed and reinterred in St. John's Cemetery in Lancaster, Massachusetts.
