= Logan International Airport =

Airport serving Boston, Massachusetts, US

General Edward Lawrence Logan International Airport Boston Logan International Airport

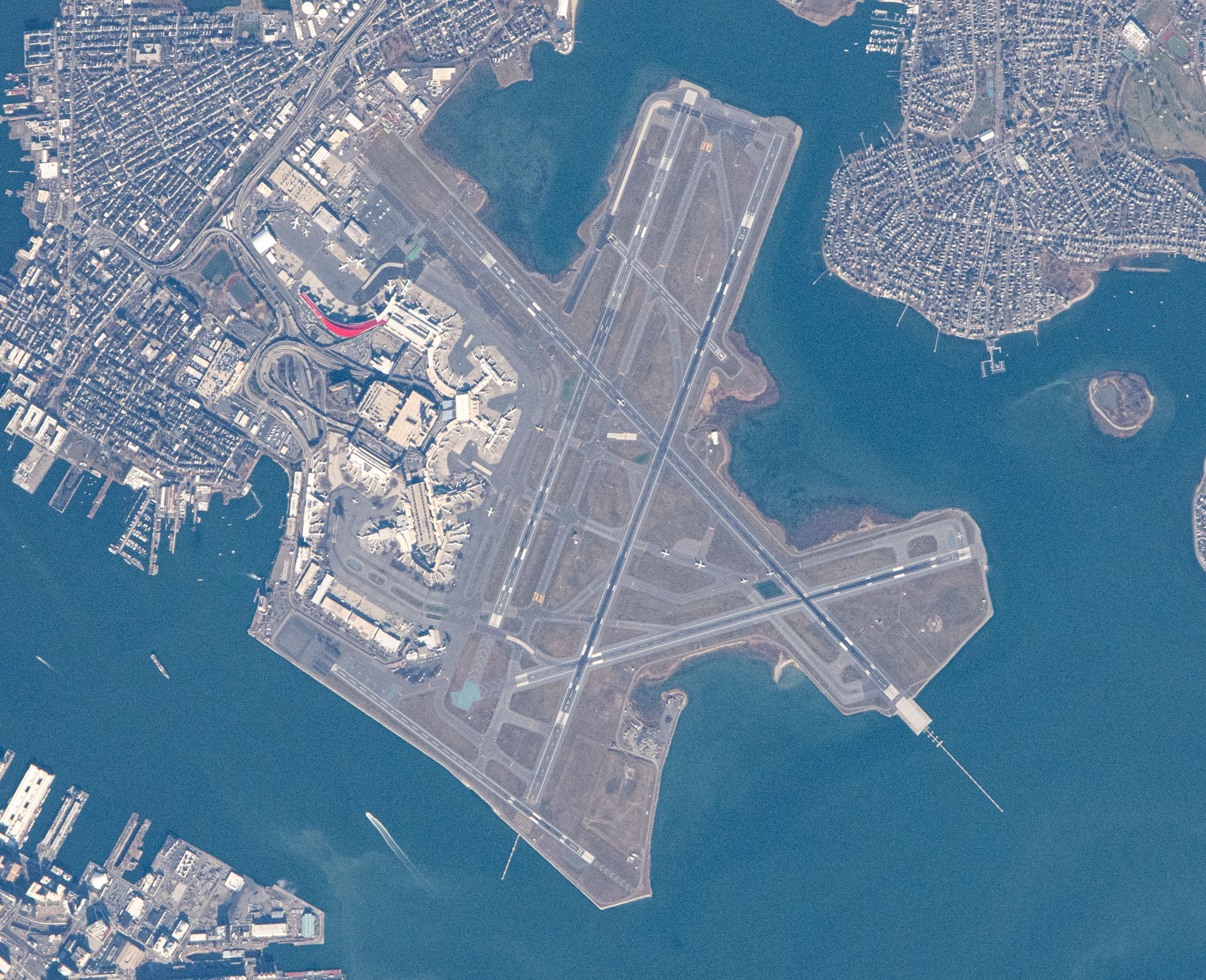
- Satellite view of the airport in December 2024
- IATA: BOS; ICAO: KBOS; FAA LID: BOS; WMO: 72509

Summary
- Airport type: Public
- Owner/Operator: Massachusetts Port Authority
- Serves: Boston
- Location: East Boston and Winthrop, Massachusetts, U.S.
- Opened: September 8, 1923; 103 years ago
- Hub for: Delta Air Lines
- Focus city for: JetBlue
- Operating base for: Cape Air
- Time zone: EST (UTC−05:00)
  - Summer (DST): EDT (UTC−04:00)
- Elevation AMSL: 19 ft (5.8 m)
- Coordinates: 42°21′47″N 071°00′23″W
- Website: www.massport.com/logan-airport

Maps
- FAA airport diagram as of February 2025
- Interactive map of General Edward Lawrence Logan International Airport; Boston Logan International Airport

Runways
Direction	Length		Surface
Direction	m	ft	Surface
4L/22R	2,397	7,864	Asphalt
4R/22L	3,050	10,006	Asphalt
9/27	2,134	7,001	Asphalt
14/32	1,524	5,000	Asphalt
15L/33R	779	2,557	Asphalt
15R/33L	3,073	10,083	Asphalt

Statistics (2025)
- Aircraft operations: 407,116
- Passengers: 43,236,013
- Cargo (lbs.): 543,165,858
- Source: Federal Aviation Administration, Massport

General Edward Lawrence Logan International Airport (IATA: BOS, ICAO: KBOS, FAA LID: BOS) — more commonly known as Boston Logan International Airport — is an international airport located mostly in East Boston and partially in Winthrop, Massachusetts, United States. Covering 2,384 acres (965 ha), it has six runways and four passenger terminals, and employs an estimated 16,000 people. It is included in the Federal Aviation Administration (FAA) National Plan of Integrated Airport Systems in which it is categorized as a large hub primary commercial service facility.

Opened in 1923 and named after General Edward Lawrence Logan, a 20th-century soldier and politician native to Boston, Logan International Airport is the largest airport in both Massachusetts and the New England region, in terms of passenger volume and cargo handling, as well as the busiest airport in the Northeastern United States outside the New York metropolitan area. The airport saw 43.5 million passengers in 2024, the most in its history. It has non-stop service to destinations throughout the United States and the world. Logan is the northeastern hub for Cape Air and is the secondary transatlantic hub for Delta Air Lines, serving several destinations in Europe. It is a focus city for JetBlue. American Airlines and United Airlines also carry out significant operations from the airport, including daily transcontinental flights. All of the major U.S. air carriers offer flights from Boston to all or the majority of their primary and secondary hubs.

== History ==
=== Origins ===
Logan Airport opened on September 8, 1923, and at that time it was mainly used by the Massachusetts Air National Guard and the United States Army Air Corps. At the time, it was referred to as "Boston Air Port" at Jeffries Point. The first scheduled commercial passenger flights to start at the new airfield were on Colonial Air Transport between Boston and New York City, starting in 1927. On January 1, 1936, the airport's weather station became the official point for Boston's weather observations and records by the National Weather Service.

=== Early postwar development ===
During the 1940s and 1950s, due to the rise in demand for air travel, the airport added 1,800 acres (2.8 sq mi; 7.3 km^{2}; 730 ha) of landfill in Boston Harbor, taken from the former Governors, Noddle's and Apple Islands. During this time, the airport expanded the terminals, adding a central terminal in 1949, which was replaced by Terminals B and C in 1974 and 1967, respectively. In 1943, the Commonwealth of Massachusetts renamed the airport after Maj. Gen. Edward Lawrence Logan, a Spanish–American War officer from South Boston, a statue of whom by sculptor Joseph Coletti was unveiled and dedicated on May 20, 1956. In 1952, Logan Airport became the first in the United States with an indirect rapid transit connection, with the opening of the Airport station on the Blue Line.

Boston became a transatlantic gateway after World War II. In the late 1940s, American Overseas Airlines began operating a weekly Boston-Shannon-London service, shortly after, Pan Am began operating nonstop service to Shannon Airport in Ireland and Santa Maria Airport in the Azores, continuing to London and Lisbon, respectively. By the early 1950s, BOAC had started nonstop Stratocruiser service to Glasgow and Prestwick in Scotland, and Air France began operating a multi-stop Constellation service linking Boston to Orly Airport in Paris. BOAC thereafter began service on the new De Havilland Comet, the first commercial jetliner in the world, on direct flights to Boston from London Heathrow. In April 1957, the Official Airline Guide showed weekday departures with the list as follows: 49 American, 31 Eastern, 25 Northeast Airlines, 8 United Airlines, 7 TWA domestic, 6 National Airlines, 6 Mohawk Airlines, 2 Trans-Canada Air Lines and one Provincetown-Boston Airlines. In addition TWA had nine departures a week to or from the Atlantic, Pan Am had 18, Air France 8, BOAC 4 and Alitalia 4. Aer Lingus launched nonstop Constellation service to Shannon in 1958.

The airport was renamed General Edward Lawrence Logan International Airport by an act of the state legislature on April 29, 1954, reflecting the growing international market.

=== Introduction of the jumbo jet and early international expansion ===
The jumbo jet era began at Logan in the summer of 1970, when Pan Am started daily Boeing 747 service to London Heathrow. Until 2020, the Boeing 747-400 was scheduled on flights to Boston by British Airways. Lufthansa operated Boeing 747s, including the latest-model Boeing 747-8, on its daily nonstop flights to Frankfurt.

Terminal E was the second-largest international arrivals facility in the United States when it opened in 1974. Between 1974 and 2015, the number of international travelers at Logan tripled. International long-haul travel has been one of the fastest growing market sectors at the airport. Massachusetts Port Authority (Massport) undertook the "Logan Modernization Project" from 1994 to 2006: a new parking garage, a new hotel, moving walkways, terminal expansions and improvements, and two-tiered roadways to separate arrival and departure traffic.

Massport's relationship with nearby communities has been strained since the mid-1960s, when the agency took control of a parcel of residential land and popular fishing area near the northwest side of the airfield. This land included Frederick Law Olmsted's 46-acre (19 ha) Wood Island Park, a valued recreational area for a neighborhood with "fewer park and recreation facilities than other neighborhoods in the city." After decades of litigation, the forfeiture was undertaken to extend Runway 15R/33L, which later became Logan's longest runway via artificial land. Outside of the park on Neptune Road, residents of the neighborhood, formerly, with its convenient park access, the "most prestigious street in East Boston," were bought out of their homes and forced to relocate. Public opposition came to a head when residents laid down in the streets to block bulldozers and supply trucks from reaching the construction zone.

=== International growth and runway additions ===
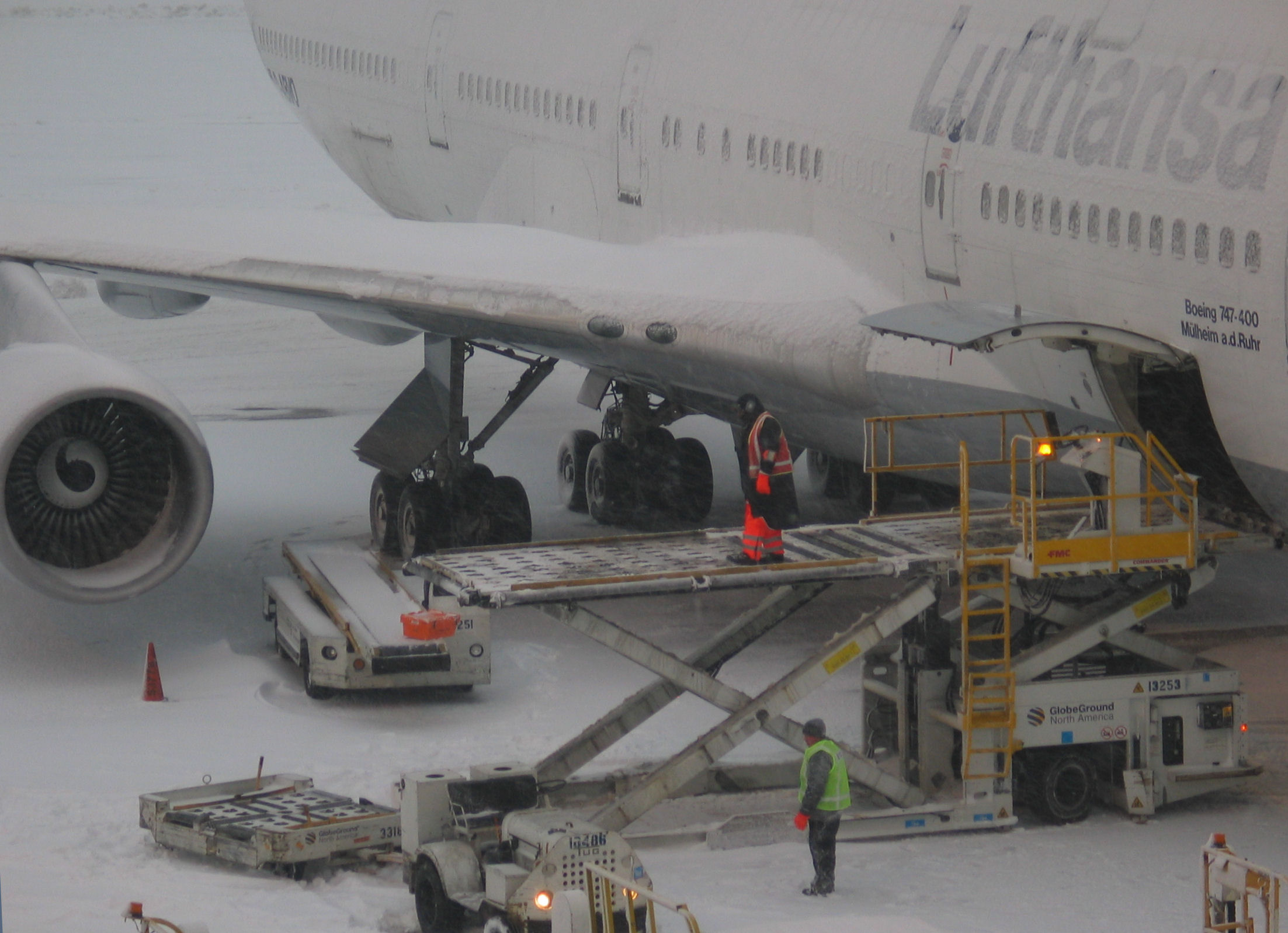
Cargo loading of a Lufthansa Boeing 747-400 during a temporary closure due to heavy snowfall in 2005

Surrounding the year 2000 the Board of Massport placed an emphasis on Logan modernization under the conceptual term "Logan 2000." A plan was devised including an idea for a Monorail or people mover to connect all terminals (post-security) as a means of cutting down on all the buses which needed to visit each terminal to make pick-ups or drop-offs. The plan was abandoned at the time due to cost of the system. However it has been raised again.

Runway 14/32, Logan's first major runway addition in more than forty years, opened on November 23, 2006. It was proposed in 1973, but was delayed in the courts. According to Massport records, the first aircraft to use the new airstrip was a Continental Express ERJ-145 regional jet landing on Runway 32, on the morning of December 2, 2006.

In April 2007, the FAA approved construction of a center field taxiway long-sought by Massport. The 9,300-foot (2,830 m) taxiway is between, and parallel to, Runways 4R/22L and 4L/22R. News of the project angered neighboring residents. In 2009, the taxiway opened ahead of schedule and under budget. To ensure the taxiway is not mistaken for a runway, "TAXI" is written in large yellow letters at each end.

A scene from the 2006 film The Departed was filmed at Logan, inside the connector bridge between Terminal E and the Central Parking Garage. Terminal C and several United Airlines and Northwest Airlines aircraft can be seen in the background. Parts of the Delta Air Lines 2007 "Anthem" commercial were filmed in Terminal A as well as the connector bridge between Terminal A and Central Parking.

In October 2009, US Airways announced it would close its Boston crew base in May 2010. The airline cited an "operations realignment" as the reason. Over 400 employees were transferred or terminated.

After starting service to Logan in 2004, JetBlue was a major operator at Logan Airport by 2008 and its largest carrier by 2011, with flights to cities throughout North America and the Caribbean. The airline grew to operate almost every gate in Terminal C and remains Logan's largest carrier as of 2023.

The Airbus A380 first landed at Logan International Airport for compatibility checks on February 8, 2010. On March 26, 2017, British Airways began flying the A380 to Logan, operating the aircraft three times per week. British Airways announced in October 2018, that A380 service to Boston would expand to daily frequency during the summer 2019 season, beginning on March 31, 2019. Likewise, in January 2019, Emirates announced that it would be deploying the A380 on its daily flight between Logan and Dubai during the June–September 2019 summer season, as high peak seasonal services replacing the B777-300ER on that route. Lufthansa deployed the A380 to Boston in 2023, on its route to Munich.

By 2024, Logan airport had grown to serve over 9 million international passengers.

== Facilities ==
Logan International Airport has four lettered passenger terminals, A, B, C, and E, and 107 gate positions in total. With the exception of flights from destinations with U.S. Customs and Border Protection preclearance, inbound international flights arrive at Terminal E for customs screening since the other terminals do not have customs screening facilities. All terminals are connected by pre-security shuttle buses and by the SL1 branch of the MBTA Silver Line BRT, and Terminals A, B, and E via pre-security moving walkways. Moving walkways also connect the terminals to a central parking garage designed for consolidated service between all four terminals and the garage itself. Post-security connection between Terminals B, C, and E is available.

=== Terminal A ===
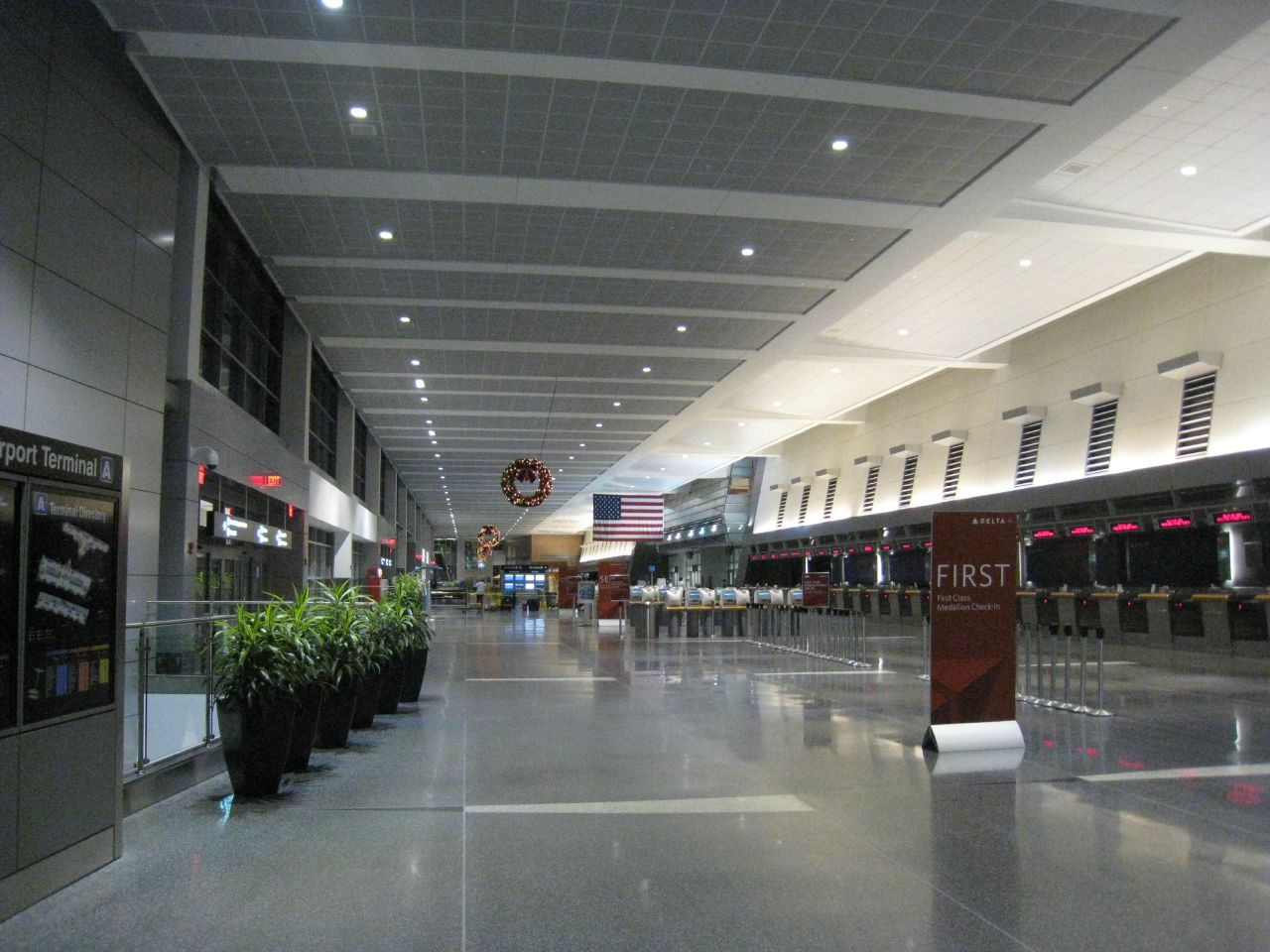
Terminal A Ticketing

Terminal A, which replaced a 1970s-era building once occupied by the now-defunct Eastern Air Lines (and later by its successor, Continental Airlines, until closing for demolition in 2002), opened to passengers on March 16, 2005. It was designed by Hellmuth, Obata + Kassabaum. The terminal is almost solely used by Delta Air Lines and is divided into a 11-gate main terminal and a 10-gate satellite terminal, which are connected via an underground pedestrian tunnel under the ramp. Terminal A features a Delta Sky Club on the third floor of the satellite building, and a second Sky Club at the site of the former Continental Airlines Presidents Club in the main terminal building.

The building is the first airport terminal in the United States to be LEED certified for environmentally friendly design by the U.S. Green Building Council. Among the building's features are heat-reflecting roof and windows, low-flow faucets and waterless urinals, self-dimming lights and stormwater filtration.

The current Terminal A was developed under a special facility lease between the Massachusetts Port Authority and Delta. On September 14, 2005, Delta filed for bankruptcy and consequently had to reduce the number of gates it leased. In December 2018, Delta announced an expansion of routes to take effect in 2019, which resulted in the airline regaining all of Terminal A (other than one gate subleased to WestJet, itself a codeshare airline with Delta). As a result, Delta declared Logan to be one of their hubs. On May 16, 2024, Massport voted to construct the Terminal A to B connector, the final link of their goal to connect all the terminals Post-Security.

=== Terminal B ===
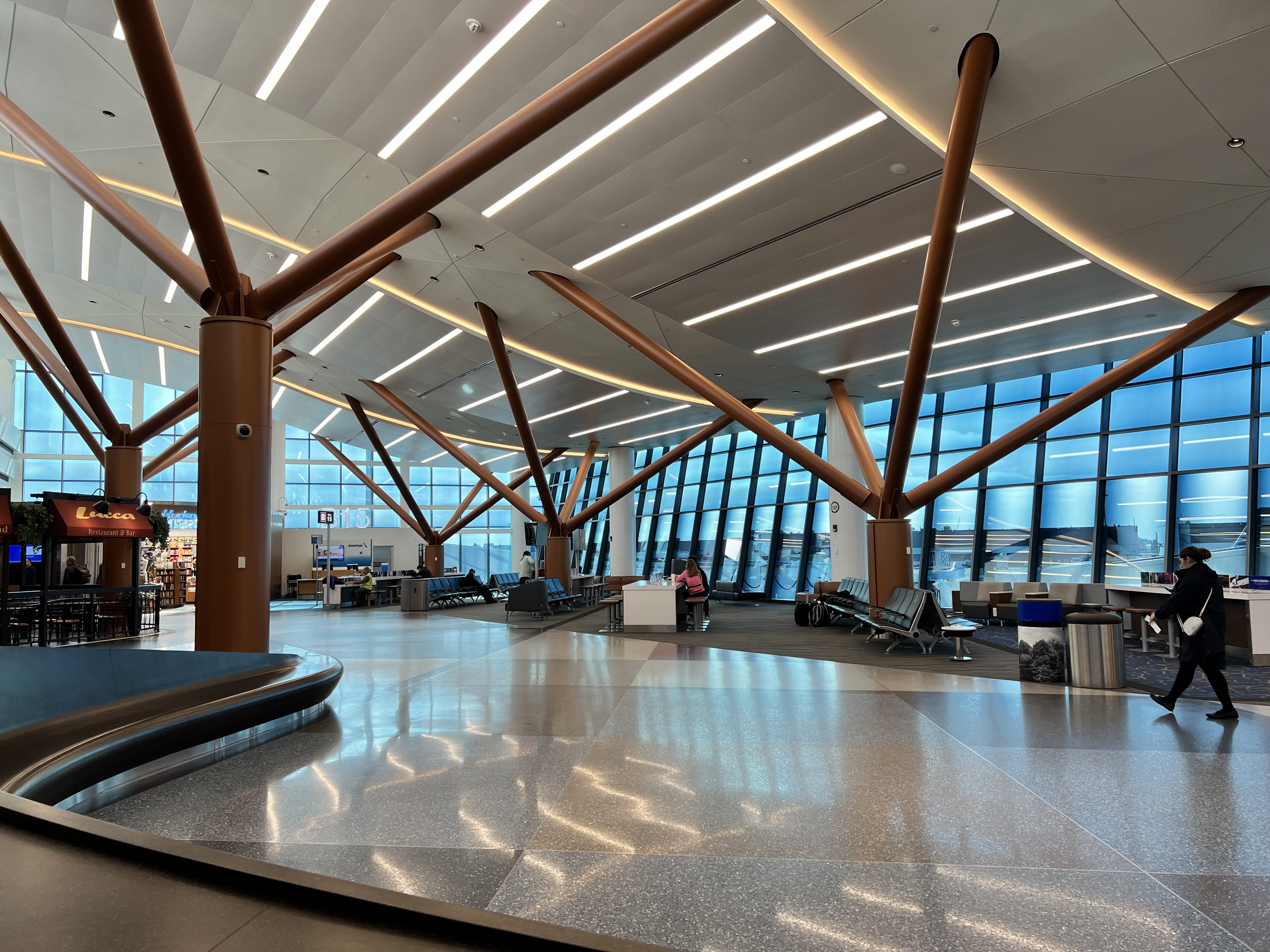
Terminal B

Terminal B, designed by John Carl Warnecke & Associates and Desmond & Lord, Inc., first opened in 1974. Air Canada, Alaska Airlines, American, Boutique Air, Southwest, and United currently operate out of the terminal which has 41 gates. American and United both operate lounges in the terminal (those being the Admirals Club and United Club, respectively) for their customers.

Pier B was completed for US Airways in 1974 and Pier A for American in 1975. The terminal remained largely unchanged until US Airways expanded its operations at Logan in 1979, and improvements designed by HNTB were constructed in 1980. From 1980 until 2000, numerous small projects including passenger seating area improvements, concessions expansions and passenger lounges were completed at both piers. American's facilities were renovated in 1995 and redesigned by Gresham, Smith & Partners, and US Airways' facilities were renovated in 1998 and 2000, and redesigned by URS Corporation in collaboration with James F. Young, with Turner Construction serving as the construction manager.

Until 2014, Terminal B was split into north and south buildings, with a parking garage between the two buildings. Between 2012 and April 2014, Terminal B underwent a $160 million renovation. It created a post-security connection between Terminal B North and Terminal B South. The renovation also included 24 new ticket counter spots, eight new departure lounges, new concession space, and a new baggage carousel.

=== Terminal C ===
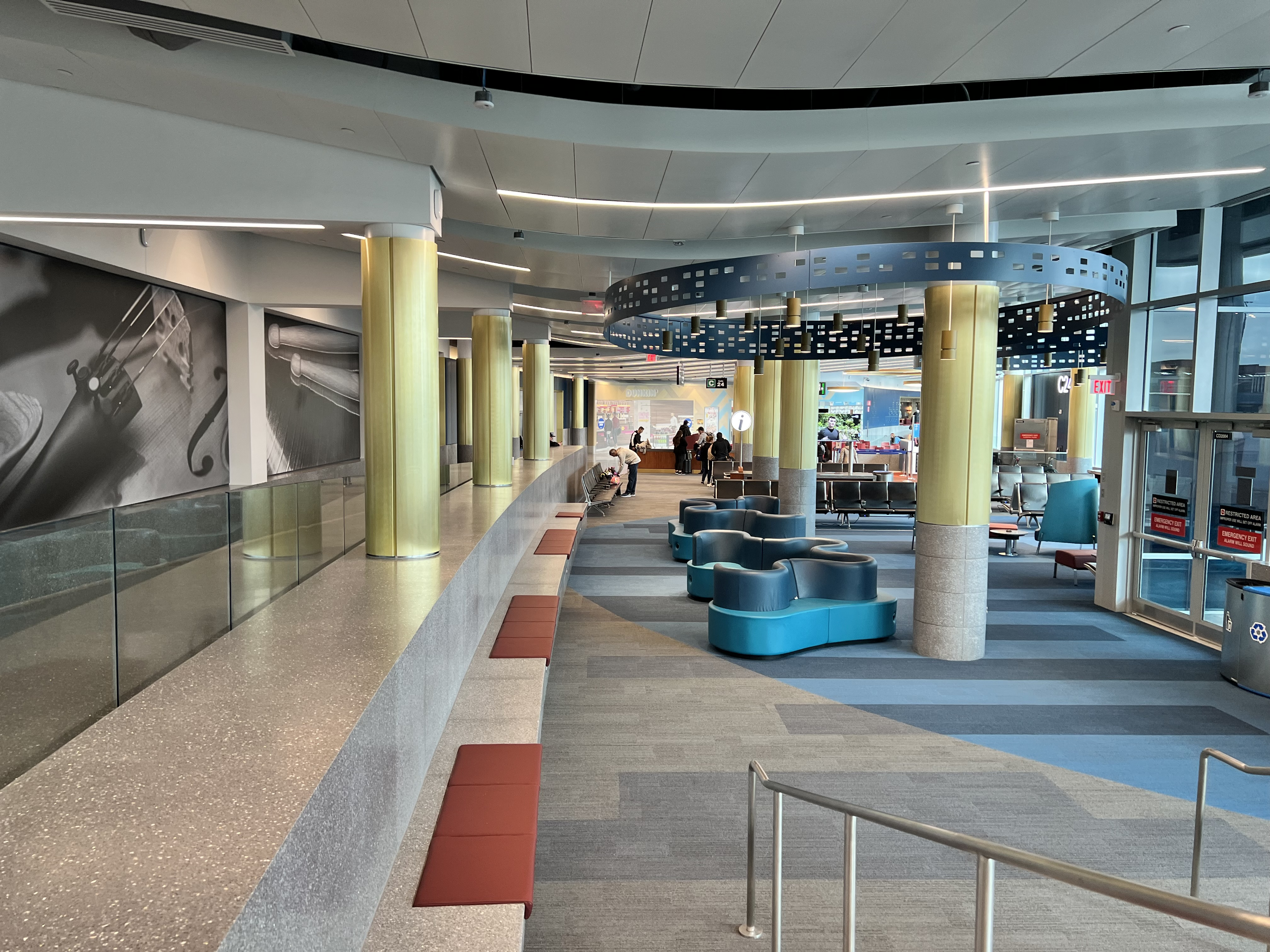
Terminal C

Terminal C opened in 1967 and was designed by Perry, Shaw, Hepburn and Dean. It underwent renovations in 1987, 2002, and 2005. The terminal, which has 27 gates, serves Aer Lingus, Cape Air, JetBlue as their operating base, with TAP Air Portugal only having departures take place out of the terminal. The airport's USO Lounge is located in the baggage claim area of Terminal C on the lower level. It offers most typical amenities as other markets as major as Greater Boston. Military ID is required for entry.

The former Terminal D gates (the three gates at the north end of Terminal C) were renumbered and labeled as part of Terminal C in February 2006. In the summer of 2016, following construction of a post-security connection between Terminals C and E, these three gates were renumbered again.

Construction on the Terminal B to C Connector was started in 2021, with the Connector opening in 2023, creating a continuous indoor post-security connection between Terminals B, C, and E. Once the Connector was completed, the former gates C40–42 were renamed B40 and C23–24. A new gate, B39, was also created from the added space in connecting Terminals B and C.

=== Terminal E ===
Terminal E ticketing

Terminal E, also known as the John A. Volpe International Terminal named after the former Governor of Massachusetts and U.S. Secretary of Transportation, serves as the international terminal for Logan and therefore houses the majority of its international arrivals (excluding flights from an origin that has U.S. border preclearance). Also, most non-U.S. carriers excluding Aer Lingus, Air Canada, TAP Air Portugal, and WestJet depart from Terminal E. The terminal has a total of 18 gates, including two gates used for hard stand boarding and two flexible-use gates which can each accommodate either 2 narrow-body aircraft or a single wide-body aircraft. All gates within the terminal are designated as common-use, meaning gates are assigned mostly based on an operational need, and no specific airline claims ownership of any of those gates. All ticket counters and gates in Terminal E are shared among the international carriers. Terminal E has several airline lounges including: Air France Lounge, British Airways Lounge, Delta One Lounge, Delta's Sky Club, Lufthansa's First Lounge and Business Lounges, and Emirates' Emirates Lounge. The third level of Terminal E is used for departures, the second for passport control via U.S. Customs and Border Protection, and the ground level for arrivals and customs, also via U.S. Customs and Border Protection. The Federal Inspection Station located in Terminal E is capable of processing over 2,000 passengers per hour.

The terminal was completed in 1974, and designed by Kubitz & Papi, Inc. and Desmond & Lord, Inc. Massport completed the "Terminal E Modernization" project in August 1997 which improved the passenger facilities. The International Gateway Project, designed by Skidmore, Owings and Merrill and DMJM Aviation, added 410,000 square feet (38,000 m^{2}) to the terminal in 2003, and the entire project was completed in 2008. Started in 2014 and completed in late January 2017, Terminal E underwent a $100 million renovation which included a post-security connector between Terminals E and C (opened summer 2016), improved immigration and passport control kiosks, and gates capable of serving the Airbus A380.

In summer 2019, Massport began another expansion project on Terminal E, due to continued growth at the airport. The project, which was completed in August 2023, included the addition of 2 new international gates (E13 and E16) as well as two flexible-use international gates which can each accommodate either two narrow-body aircraft or a single wide-body aircraft (E14 and E15). The project includes all-new shops, restaurants and other passenger services which stretch into the North Cargo area. Additionally, a new TSA checkpoint was built and the ticketing, customs, and baggage claim areas were expanded. In total, the project cost $680 million and incorporated roughly 320,000 square feet (30,000 m^{2}) of new space. The project, inclusive of a prismatic painted roof, was designed by AECOM and luis vidal + architects, with Boston-based Suffolk Construction Company serving as construction manager.

=== Runways ===
Runways and terminals at BOS

Located partly in East Boston and partly in the Town of Winthrop, on Boston Harbor, Logan International Airport covers an area of 2,384 acres (965 ha) which contains six runways:

- Runway 4L/22R: 7,864 ft × 150 ft (2,397 m × 46 m)
- Runway 4R/22L: 10,006 ft × 150 ft (3,050 m × 46 m)
- Runway 9/27: 7,001 ft × 150 ft (2,134 m × 46 m)
- Runway 14/32: 5,000 ft × 100 ft (1,524 m × 30 m)
- Runway 15L/33R: 2,557 ft × 100 ft (779 m × 30 m)
- Runway 15R/33L: 10,083 ft × 150 ft (3,073 m × 46 m)

The runways are operated in four patterns depending on the wind direction:

- Northeast winds: Arrivals on 4L and 4R; departures from 9, 4L, and 4R
- Northwest winds: Arrivals on 33L, 32, and 27; departures from 33L and 27
- Southeast winds: Arrivals on 15L and 15R; departures from 15R, 14, and 9
- Southwest winds: Arrivals on 22L, 22R, and 27; departures from 22L and 22R

Jet aircraft are prohibited from landing on Runway 22R or from taking off on Runway 4L. In addition, aircraft of any type are prohibited from landing on Runway 9. These restrictions may be waived during emergencies and/or periods of runway maintenance.

Between 1968 and 1971, Taxiway Sierra was converted into STOL runway 18/36, which was 1,800 ft (550 m) for use by Eastern Air Lines's STOL capable Breguet 941 turboprop shuttle.

Instrument landing system approaches are available for runways 4R, 15R, 22L, 27, and 33L, with runways 4R and 33L certified for CAT III operations. The other runways with ILS are certified for CAT I Instrument Landing operations. EMAS pads are located at the starting thresholds of runways 22R and 33L. In September 2025, Runway 9/27, which is the airport's busiest runway, was closed down for construction of an EMAS pad at the east end of the airstrip. The runway was re-opened on November 14, 2025, following completion of the $110 million project.

==== Runway 14/32 ====
Runway 14/32, which opened to air traffic on November 23, 2006, is unidirectional. Runway 32 is used for landings and 14 is used for takeoffs. Massport is barred by a court order from using the runway for overland landings or takeoffs, except in emergencies.

There was fierce opposition towards the construction of 14/32 among communities adjacent to the northwest side of the airport, such as Chelsea and East Boston, as authorities acknowledged these areas would likely see increased noise levels. Many Residents of Winthrop and Revere also joined in opposition, even though Massport had predicted the new traffic patterns allowed by 14/32 would actually reduce overflights and noise in those areas.

Since the opening of the new runway, there has been disagreement about when and how often it should operate. Residents have demanded a minimum of 11.5-knot (21.3 km/h) northwest winds, slightly higher than the 10-knot (19 km/h; 12 mph) threshold favored by Massport.

Boston's Hyatt Harborside Hotel, which sits only a few hundred yards from the runway threshold, was built partly to prevent Massport from ever extending the length of 14/32 or using it for takeoffs or landings over the city. Massachusetts state legislators carefully chose the location of the hotel—directly in the runway centerline—prior to its construction in 1992.

The rationale behind construction of Runway 14/32 was to allow Logan to have up to three runways simultaneously open during strong northwesterly winds, which are fairly common during Boston's wintertime. Historically, such weather conditions meant that Logan could have only two runways (33L and 27) open at once, which contributed to the airport being one of the most delay-prone in the country.

Massport had long sought to alleviate this problem with a second northwest-southeast runway, and in the mid-1960s, construction began on what is now Runway 15L/33R. However, community opposition brought the project to a halt after builders had completed only 2,557 feet (779 m) of the new airstrip, leaving it much too short for all but the smallest and lightest of aircraft. In 1988, Massport made one final proposal to extend the runway by 800 feet (240 meters), but was thwarted by a court injunction.

Owing to the unusually short length of 15L/33R, takeoffs from this runway are strictly prohibited. It is now the shortest runway at any of the 30 busiest U.S. airports, and remains, as of 2026, virtually unused except for a few occasional landings by Cape Air.

=== Ground transportation ===
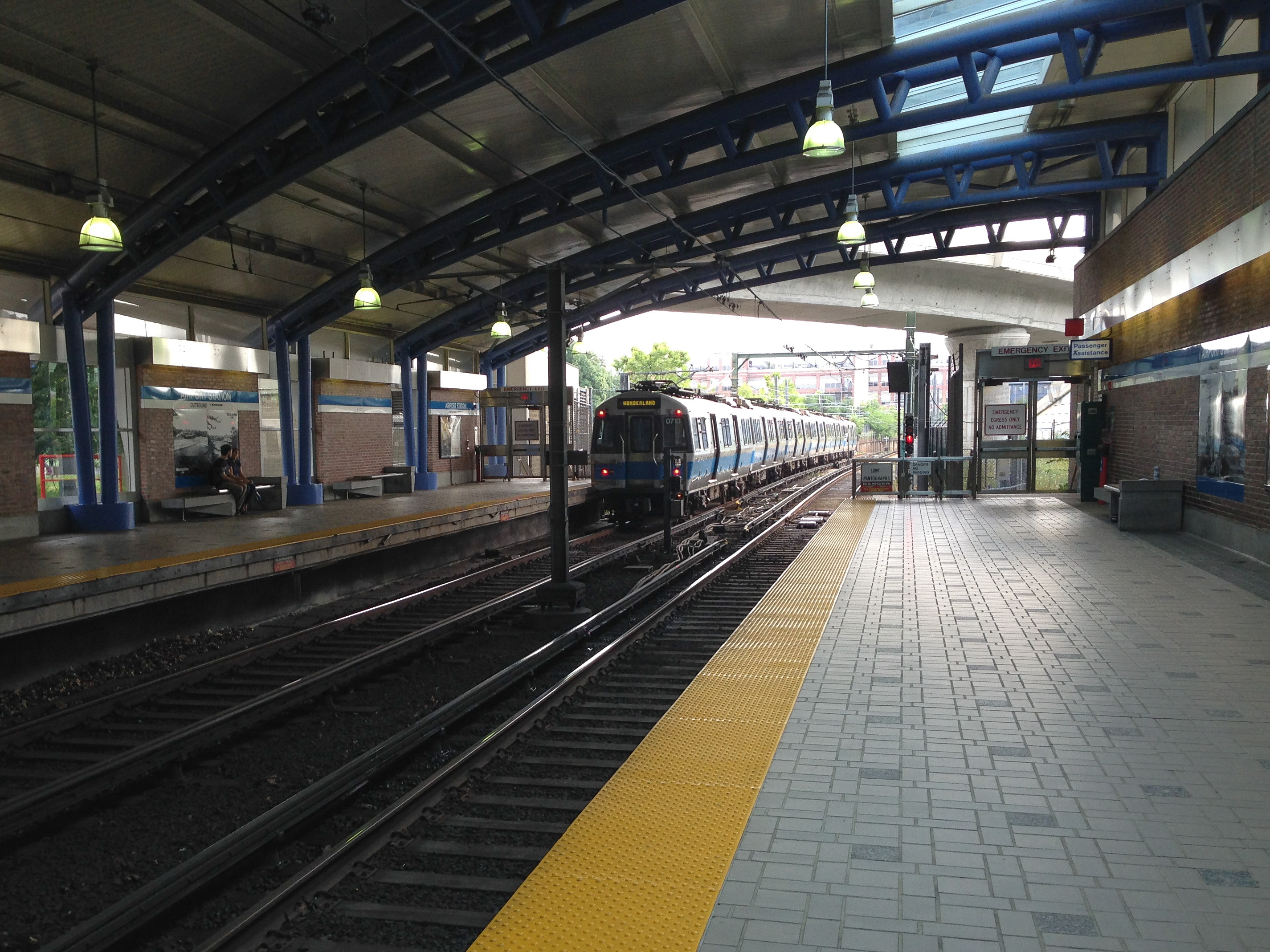
A Blue Line train approaches the northbound platform (left) at Airport station; the southbound platform is on the right side of the image.

Geographically, Logan Airport is located 2.5 miles (4.0 km) northeast of Back Bay, a short distance with respect to other airports similarly sized and metropolitan areas served. Located on Route 1A, the airport is accessed from I-93 through the Sumner and Callahan Tunnels, and I-90/Massachusetts Turnpike through the Ted Williams Tunnel.

Massport operates an intercity bus common carrier called Logan Express. It provides shuttle service to remote park and rides located at Back Bay, Braintree, Framingham, Danvers, and Woburn. Massport also operates the Airport Shuttle which provides free service between all terminals, the Airport station on the Blue Line, and the Rental Car Center, as well as additional service to the water transportation dock located on Harborside Drive. The Rental Car Center, a 120,000 sq ft (11,000 m^{2}) $310 million CONRAC opened on September 24, 2013, has 3,200 parking spaces across four levels. Rental car companies such as Alamo, Avis, Budget, Dollar, Enterprise, Hertz, National, Payless, Sixt, Thrifty, and Zipcar operate out of the facility.

Ride Shares serve the airport via the central parking garage. A handful of livery-plate operators also service the airport offering various chauffeured car, van, or limousine for-hire offerings.

The SL1 branch of the MBTA's Silver Line bus rapid transit service connects all Logan terminals with South Station, a major transportation hub in downtown Boston that is served by MBTA Commuter Rail, Amtrak, the Red Line subway, and intercity bus.

BRT services at the airport terminals
Preceding station	MBTA	Following station
Silver Line Way toward South Station	Silver Line SL1	Terminus

The SL3 branch of the Silver Line connects Chelsea with the Airport Station. The Airport station on the MBTA's Blue Line subway, despite its name, is not in the airport terminal itself; free shuttle buses carry passengers between the Airport station and the terminal buildings. The Blue Line connects with the Orange Line at State, which provides service to both North Station and Back Bay, the two other major rail transportation hubs for Boston. A transfer to the Green Line, which also runs to North Station, is available at Government Center station.

=== Remote terminal ===
Since June 1, 2026, eligible passengers flying Delta Air Lines or JetBlue can check in, along with their baggage, and complete security at a remote terminal in Framingham. Passengers can then travel on a bus to Logan Airport and enter the post-security area of their terminal.

in October 2026, Massport broke ground at the Braintree Logan Express location for a new Remote Terminal to be built, along with new two new parking garages.

=== Other facilities ===
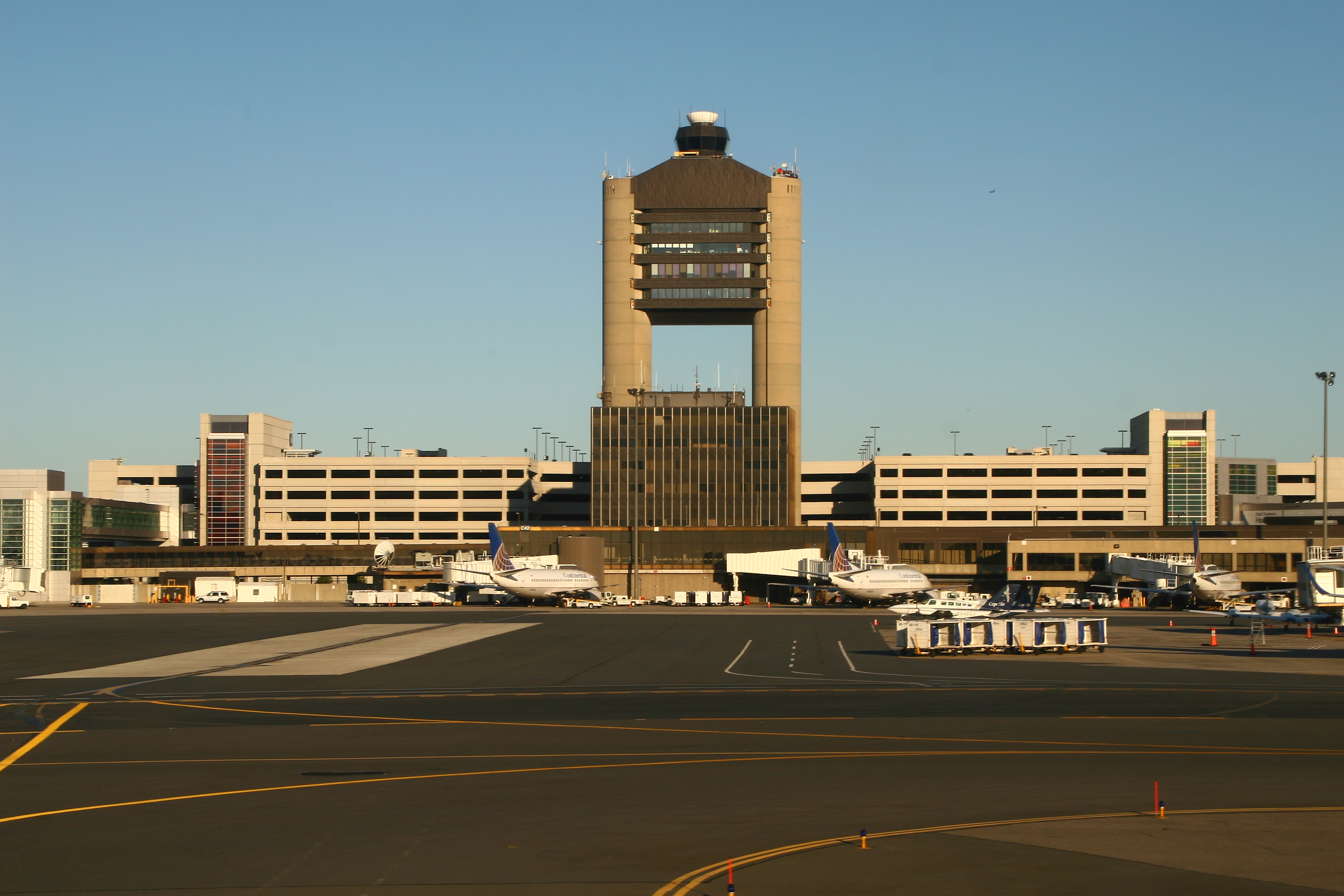
Logan control tower along with Continental Airlines and Cape Air aircraft (September 2007)

The distinctive central control tower, nearly a dozen stories high, is a local landmark with its pair of segmented elliptical pylons and a six-story platform trussed between them.

Logan Airport has two cargo facilities: North Cargo is adjacent to Terminal E and South Cargo adjacent to Terminals A and B. North Cargo is also the location of several maintenance hangars, including those operated by American Airlines, Delta, and JetBlue.

Signature Aviation operates a FBO in the North Cargo area near runway 15R/33L. Also located on airport property is the Amelia Earhart General Aviation Terminal, which is located near runway 14/32 and next to the Massport Fire Rescue headquarters. The terminal was built in 1980, and dedicated to former Boston resident Earhart in 1984. Until 2006, American Eagle flights flew out of the terminal when all flights were consolidated in the former B22-29 gates in Pier A, the north building of Terminal B. Passengers had to take a shuttle bus from Terminal B to the Earhart Terminal. The terminal currently sits mostly unused.

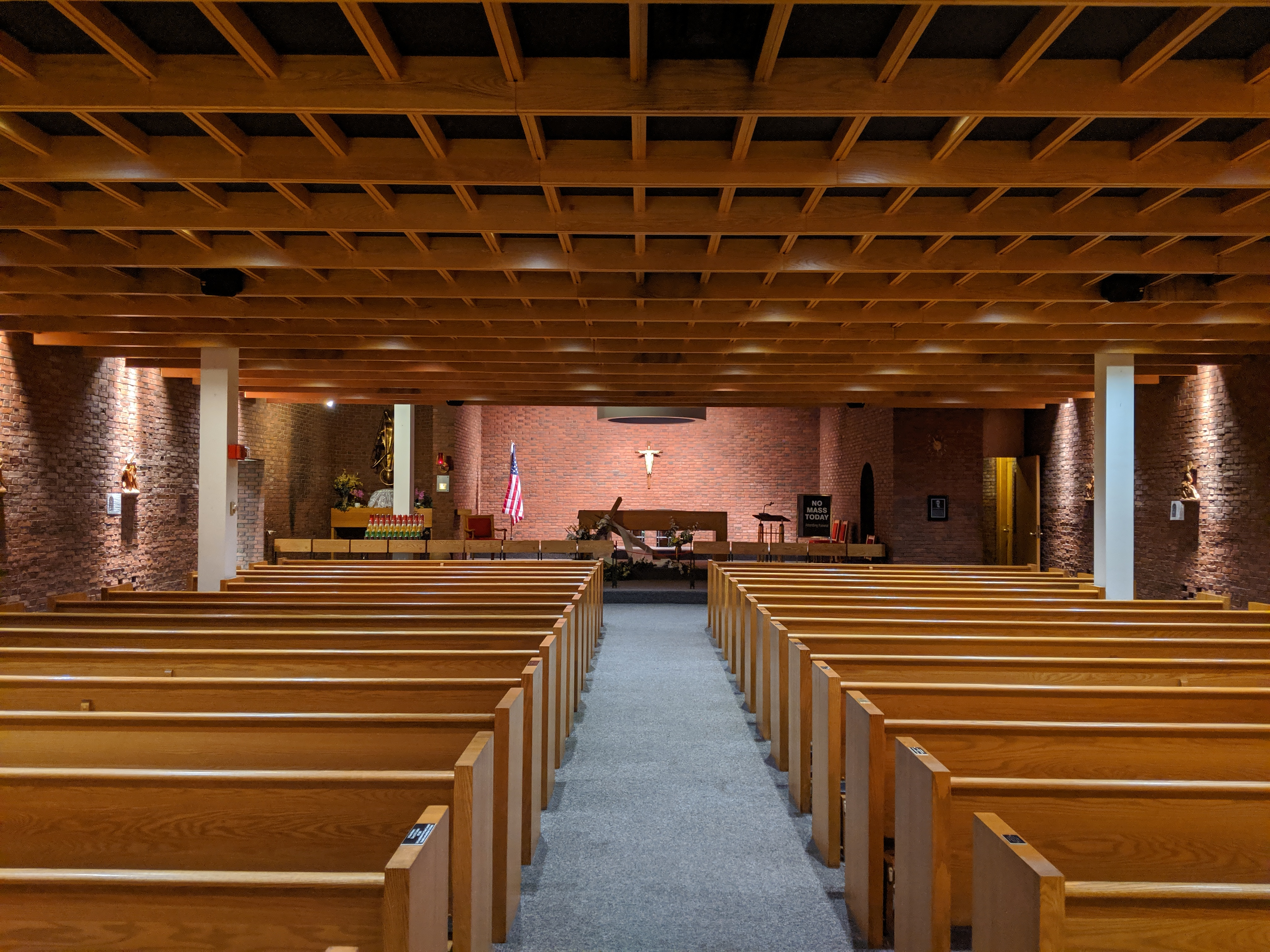
Our Lady of the Airways Chapel at the airport. The chapel is the oldest airport chapel in the United States, opening originally in 1951 in another part of the airport.

Terminal C is home to the airport's chapel, Our Lady of the Airways. Opened in 1951, it is considered the first airport chapel in the United States. The chapel was originally Catholic, but is now non-denominational.

=== Public safety ===
Police services are provided by the Massachusetts State Police Troop F. Fire protection is the responsibility of the Massport Fire Rescue. Even though the airport is technically within city limits, under Massachusetts state law municipal police such as the Boston Police Department do not have jurisdiction on Massport property.

A 250-foot security zone, established in 2002, surrounds the waters around the airport which are marked by 29 buoys indicating the restricted area. The area is patrolled by the Massachusetts State Police, the Boston Police Department, the Massachusetts Environmental Police, the United States Coast Guard and the Boston and Winthrop Harbormasters. Anyone who enters the zone for non-emergency purposes is subject to prosecution and is entered into a State Police database that tracks offenders.

== Airlines and destinations ==
=== Passenger ===
Airlines	Destinations
Aer Lingus	Dublin, Shannon
Aeroméxico	Mexico City–Benito Juárez
Air Canada	Toronto–Pearson
Air Canada Express	Halifax, Montréal–Trudeau, Toronto–Billy Bishop, Toronto–Pearson
Air France	Paris–Charles de Gaulle
Alaska Airlines	Portland (OR), San Diego, Seattle/Tacoma; Seasonal: Anchorage
Allegiant Air	Asheville, Des Moines, Destin/Fort Walton Beach, Fort Lauderdale, Grand Rapids, Knoxville, Sarasota, Savannah; Seasonal: Indianapolis, Orlando/Sanford (begins February 13, 2027), Punta Gorda (FL) (begins February 13, 2027), St. Petersburg/Clearwater (begins February 13, 2027)
American Airlines	Charlotte, Chicago–O'Hare, Dallas/Fort Worth, London–Heathrow, Los Angeles, Miami, Orlando, Philadelphia, Phoenix–Sky Harbor, Washington–National; Seasonal: Cancún, Providenciales, Punta Cana, Tampa
American Eagle	Buffalo, Chicago–O'Hare, Cincinnati, Columbus–Glenn, Harrisburg, Indianapolis, Louisville, Madison, New York–JFK, New York–LaGuardia, Rochester (NY), St. Louis, Syracuse, Washington–National; Seasonal: Halifax, Hilton Head, Key West, Myrtle Beach, Nantucket, Philadelphia, Traverse City, Wilmington (NC)
Arajet	Santo Domingo–Las Américas
Austrian Airlines	Vienna
Avianca	Bogotá
Avianca El Salvador	San Salvador
Azores Airlines	Ponta Delgada, Terceira
BermudAir	Bermuda; Seasonal: Anguilla, Belize City (begins December 19, 2026), Guatemala City (begins December 19, 2026), Providenciales (begins December 19, 2026)
Boutique Air	Massena
Breeze Airways	Myrtle Beach (begins May 4, 2027)
British Airways	London–Heathrow
Cape Air	Augusta (ME), Bar Harbor, Hyannis, Lebanon (NH), Martha's Vineyard, Nantucket, Rockland, Rutland, Saranac Lake/Lake Placid; Seasonal: Long Island/Islip, Provincetown
Cathay Pacific	Hong Kong
Condor	Seasonal: Frankfurt
Copa Airlines	Panama City–Tocumen
Delta Air Lines	Amsterdam, Atlanta, Austin, Cancún, Charleston (SC), Chicago–O'Hare, Dallas/Fort Worth, Denver, Detroit, Dublin, Fort Lauderdale, Fort Myers, Kansas City, Las Vegas, Lisbon, London–Heathrow, Los Angeles, Miami, Minneapolis/St. Paul, Nashville, New Orleans, New York–JFK, New York–LaGuardia, Orlando, Paris–Charles de Gaulle, Phoenix–Sky Harbor, Raleigh/Durham, Rome–Fiumicino, Salt Lake City, San Antonio, San Diego, San Francisco, San Juan, Seattle/Tacoma, Tampa, Tel Aviv (suspended), West Palm Beach; Seasonal: Aruba, Athens, Barcelona, Bozeman, Edinburgh, Honolulu (resumes December 19, 2026), Liberia (CR), Madrid, Milan–Malpensa, Montego Bay, Myrtle Beach, Nassau, Nice, Providenciales, Punta Cana, Reykjavík–Keflavík (begins April 12, 2027), St. Thomas, Venice (begins May 7, 2027)
Delta Connection	Baltimore, Charlotte, Cincinnati, Cleveland, Columbus–Glenn, Indianapolis, Jacksonville (FL), Kansas City, Louisville, Madison, Memphis, Milwaukee, Nashville, New York–JFK, New York–LaGuardia, Newark, Norfolk, Philadelphia, Pittsburgh, Richmond, Savannah, Washington–National; Seasonal: Asheville, Chicago–O'Hare, Halifax, Sarasota, Traverse City, Wilmington (NC)
El Al	Tel Aviv
Emirates	Dubai–International
Etihad Airways	Abu Dhabi
Frontier Airlines	Atlanta, Orlando, Raleigh/Durham, San Juan
Hainan Airlines	Beijing–Capital
Iberia	Madrid
Icelandair	Reykjavík–Keflavík
ITA Airways	Rome–Fiumicino
Japan Airlines	Tokyo–Narita
JetBlue	Aruba, Atlanta, Austin, Barbados, Bermuda, Buffalo, Cancún, Charleston (SC), Chicago–O'Hare, Cleveland, Denver, Detroit, Fort Lauderdale, Fort Myers, Houston–Intercontinental, Jacksonville (FL), Las Vegas, London–Heathrow, Los Angeles, Montego Bay, Nashville, Nassau, New Orleans, New York–JFK, Orlando, Paris–Charles de Gaulle, Philadelphia, Pittsburgh, Presque Isle, Punta Cana, Raleigh/Durham, Richmond, San Diego, San Francisco, San Juan, Santiago de los Caballeros, Santo Domingo–Las Américas, Sarasota, Savannah, Sint Maarten, St. Thomas, Syracuse, Tampa, Vero Beach, Washington–National, West Palm Beach; Seasonal: Amsterdam, Barcelona, Bozeman, Destin/Fort Walton Beach, Dublin, Edinburgh, Grand Cayman, Hayden/Steamboat Springs, Key West, Liberia (CR), London–Gatwick, Madrid, Martha's Vineyard, Milan–Malpensa, Milwaukee, Nantucket, Norfolk, Phoenix–Sky Harbor, Portland (OR), Providenciales, Puerto Plata, Salt Lake City, Seattle/Tacoma, St. Lucia–Hewanorra, Traverse City, Vancouver, Wilmington (NC)
KLM	Amsterdam
Korean Air	Seoul–Incheon
LATAM Brasil	São Paulo–Guarulhos
Level	Barcelona
Lufthansa	Frankfurt, Munich
Porter Airlines	Montréal–Trudeau, Ottawa, Toronto–Billy Bishop, Toronto–Pearson
Qatar Airways	Doha
Scandinavian Airlines	Copenhagen
Southwest Airlines	Austin, Baltimore, Chicago–Midway, Dallas–Love, Denver, Kansas City, Las Vegas (begins March 11, 2027), Nashville, San Diego, St. Louis; Seasonal: Orlando
Sun Country Airlines	Minneapolis/St. Paul
Sunrise Airways	Cap-Haïtien
Swiss International Air Lines	Zurich
TAP Air Portugal	Lisbon, Porto
Turkish Airlines	Istanbul
United Airlines	Chicago–O'Hare, Denver, Houston–Intercontinental, Los Angeles, Newark, San Francisco, Washington–Dulles; Seasonal: Jackson Hole (begins February 13, 2027)
United Express	Newark
Virgin Atlantic	London–Heathrow
Volaris	Guadalajara
WestJet	Seasonal: Calgary

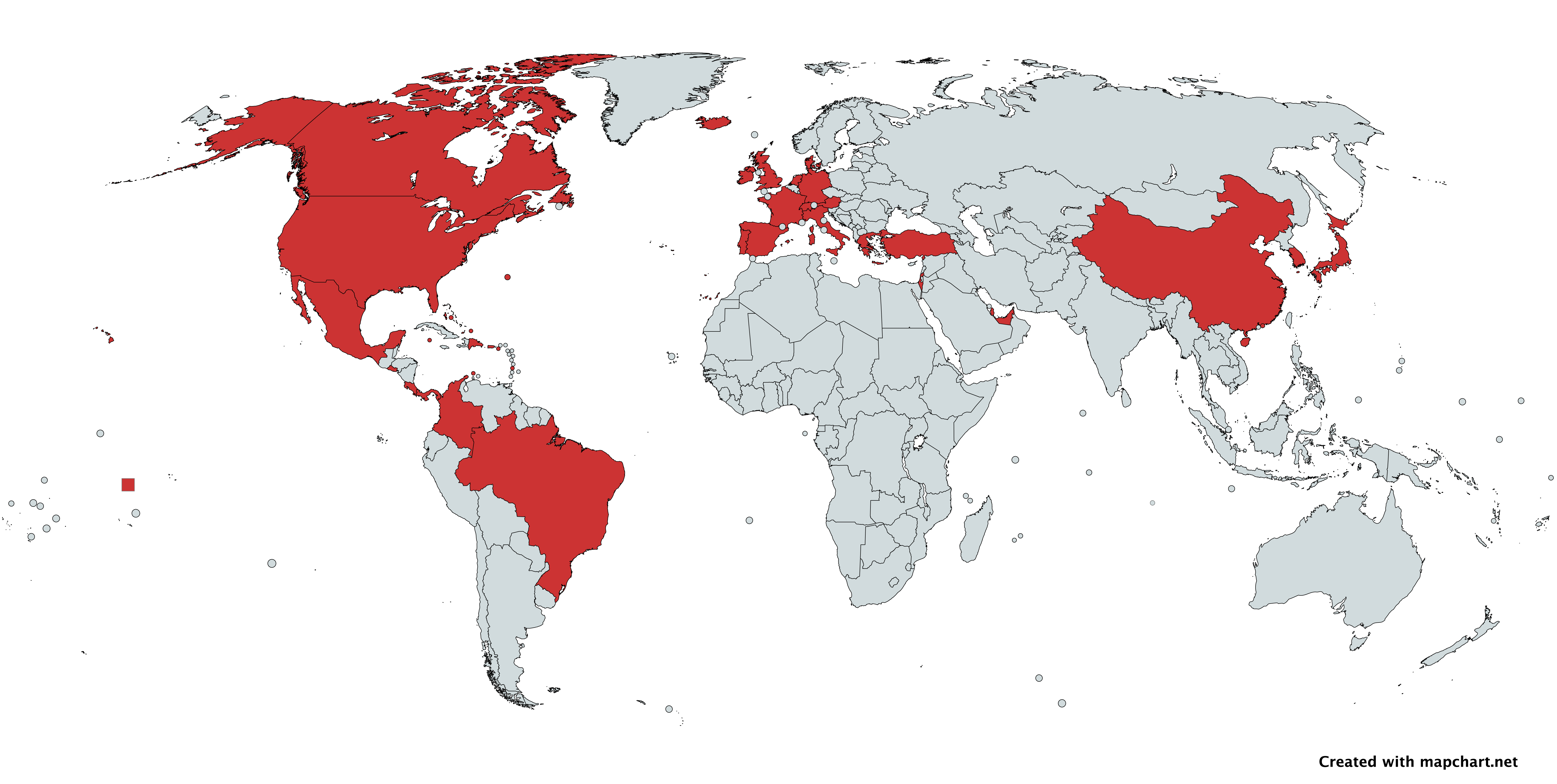
Boston Logan International Airport passenger destinations

=== Cargo ===
Logan Airport is a medium-sized airport in terms of cargo, handling 543,165,858 pounds (lb) of freight in 2025. The airport has two cargo complexes: North Cargo, located near Terminal E, and South Cargo, located near Terminal A.

The airport handles many U.S.-based cargo airlines, including DHL Aviation, FedEx Express and UPS Airlines. South Cargo contains the cargo offices for Delta Air Lines, FedEx Express, and Southwest Airlines. Also located at South Cargo are Swissport, which handles cargo for United Airlines and several international carriers, and Worldwide Flight Services. Worldwide Flight Services handles cargo for American Airlines and several international cargo carriers such as Cathay, IAG Cargo, LATAM, and Lufthansa.

With many companies operating at the airport, it has been recognized that future expansion of cargo from Logan is limited due to constrained physical space for expansion.

== Statistics ==
=== Top destinations ===
Busiest domestic routes from BOS (September 2025 – August 2026)
Rank	Airport	Passengers	Airlines served
1	Chicago–O'Hare, Illinois	949,612	American, Delta, JetBlue, United
2	Atlanta, Georgia	779,228	Delta, Frontier, JetBlue
3	Washington–National, D.C.	722,686	American, Delta, JetBlue
4	San Francisco, California	694,919	Alaska, Delta, JetBlue, United
5	Orlando, Florida	682,689	American, Delta, Frontier, JetBlue, Spirit
6	Los Angeles, California	634,880	American, Delta, JetBlue, United
7	Denver, Colorado	603,133	Delta, JetBlue, Southwest, United
8	Dallas/Fort Worth, Texas	506,488	American, Delta, JetBlue
9	Miami, Florida	495,943	American, Delta, JetBlue, Spirit
10	Philadelphia, Pennsylvania	482,198	American, Delta, JetBlue

Busiest international routes from BOS (September 2025 – August 2026)
Rank	City	Passengers	Carriers
1	London–Heathrow, United Kingdom	1,082,505	American, British Airways, Delta, JetBlue, Virgin Atlantic
2	Paris–Charles de Gaulle, France	530,487	Air France, Delta, JetBlue
3	Dublin, Ireland	478,237	Aer Lingus, Delta, JetBlue
4	Amsterdam, Netherlands	446,708	Delta, JetBlue, KLM
5	Oranjestad, Aruba	346,396	Delta, JetBlue
6	Lisbon, Portugal	327,846	Delta, TAP Air Portugal
7	Madrid, Spain	299,812	Delta, Iberia Air Lines Of Spain, JetBlue
8	Santo Domingo, Dominican Republic	274,004	Arajet, JetBlue, Spirit
9	Cancún, Mexico	264,719	American, Delta, JetBlue
10	Toronto–Pearson, Canada	261,003	Air Canada, Porter

=== Airline market share ===
Busiest airlines serving BOS (September 2025 – August 2026)
Rank	Carrier	Passengers	Share
1	Delta Air Lines	11,602,969	27.7%
2	JetBlue	10,606,656	25.3%
3	American Airlines	6,226,093	14.9%
4	United Airlines	3,834,446	9.2%
5	Southwest Airlines	2,012,647	4.8%
-	Other	7,600,000	18.1%

=== Annual traffic ===
Annual traffic
	Passengers	Change from previous year	Aircraft operations	Total cargo (freight, express, & mail) (lbs.)
1998	23,699,909	N/A	507,449	803,841,263
1999	24,675,345	▲4.1%	494,816	824,167,499
2000	25,917,875	▲5.0%	487,996	852,347,154
2001	22,593,930	▼12.8%	463,125	744,797,296
2002	21,711,813	▼3.9%	392,079	789,610,008
2003	22,197,354	▲2.2%	373,304	744,838,287
2004	25,606,069	▲15.4%	405,258	759,274,990
2005	26,502,576	▲3.5%	409,066	741,517,308
2006	27,220,629	▲2.7%	406,119	679,068,089
2007	27,642,471	▲1.5%	399,537	632,449,775
2008	25,737,055	▼6.9%	371,604	587,772,302
2009	25,192,001	▼2.1%	345,306	517,557,182
2010	27,202,562	▲8.0%	352,643	546,379,403
2011	28,451,892	▲4.6%	368,987	529,212,783
2012	28,706,032	▲0.9%	354,869	525,392,642
2013	29,715,165	▲3.5%	361,339	538,192,790
2014	31,090,392	▲4.6%	363,797	585,459,955
2015	32,844,315	▲5.6%	372,930	575,781,601
2016	35,748,720	▲8.8%	391,222	616,933,699
2017	37,717,009	▲5.5%	401,371	679,407,977
2018	40,214,905	▲6.6%	424,024	704,200,557
2019	41,544,232	▲3.3%	427,176	688,939,147
2020	12,145,126	▼70.8%	206,702	575,471,964
2021	21,941,124	▲80.7%	266,034	617,962,396
2022	35,025,021	▲59.6%	378,613	645,688,980
2023	40,095,599	▲14.5%	395,146	565,119,946
2024	42,676,138	▲6.4%	413,409	568,391,978
2025	42,260,667	▼1.0%	407,116	543,165,858

== Accidents and incidents ==
=== Accidents ===
- On June 5, 1930, A Colonial Air Transport Ford Trimotor bound for New York went nose down after takeoff and crashed into the sea. The aircraft came to rest in seven feet (2.1 m) of water. One passenger died out of the 13 passengers and two crew.
- On October 4, 1960, Eastern Air Lines Flight 375, a Lockheed L-188 Electra crashed into the sea while attempting to take off from Logan Airport. Sixty-two people died and ten people survived, incurring serious injuries.
- On November 15, 1961, A Vickers Viscount N6592C of Northeast Airlines collided with a Douglas DC-6 N8228H of National Airlines after landing at Logan International Airport. The DC-6 had started to take off without receiving clearance to do so.
- On March 10, 1964, a Slick Airways DC-4 crashed 1.3 mi (2.1 km) southwest of Logan while on final approach. All three occupants were killed. Loss of control due to accumulation of ice on the horizontal stabilizer, causing the aircraft to pitch down, was the probable cause.
- On July 31, 1973, Delta Air Lines Flight 723 crashed while on an ILS instrument approach in heavy fog. The DC-9 struck a seawall, killing all 89 occupants. Two people initially survived, but later succumbed to their injuries. It is considered the deadliest crash to occur at Logan Airport.
- On November 3, 1973, Pan Am Flight 160, a Boeing 707-321C cargo aircraft, crashed on approach to Boston-Logan. Smoke in the cockpit caused the pilots to lose control. All three crewmembers died in the accident.
- On December 17, 1973, Iberia Airlines Flight 933 from Madrid Barajas International Airport collided with the ALS system 500 feet (150 m) short of the runway threshold, critically damaging the front landing gear and causing it to collapse. The aircraft came to a rest 300 feet (91 m) short of the runway. All 168 onboard survived; however, the aircraft was written off and was the first hull loss of a DC-10.
- On January 23, 1982, World Airways Flight 30 from Newark to Boston made a non-precision instrument approach to runway 15R and touched down 2,800 feet (850 m) past the displaced threshold on an icy runway. When the crew sensed that the DC-10-30-CF could not be stopped on the remaining runway, they steered the DC-10 off the side of the runway to avoid the approach light pier, and slid into the shallow water of Boston Harbor. The nose section separated as the DC-10 came to rest 250 feet (76 m) past the runway end, 110 feet (34 m) left of the extended centerline. Two passengers were never found and are presumed to have been swept out to sea.

=== Incidents ===
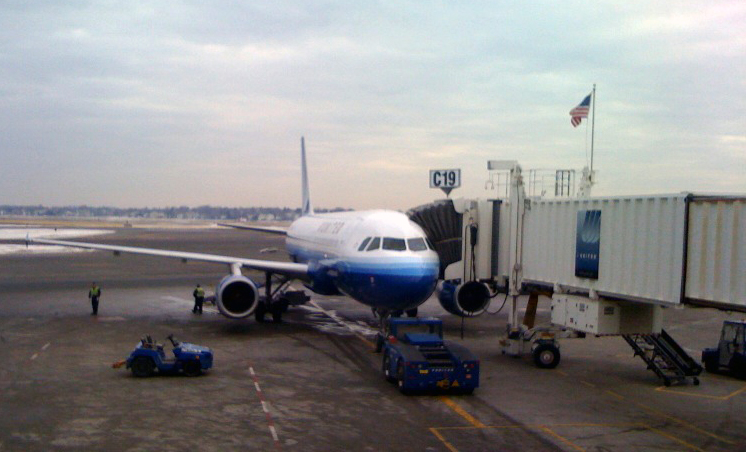
Gate C19 was the departure gate for United Airlines Flight 175 on 9/11.

- On October 2, 1954, a Massachusetts Air National Guard F-94 Starfire experienced engine failure and crashed near Logan Airport. Its pilot, First Lieutenant James O. Conway, sacrificed his life by veering the plane into an embankment on Bayswater Street in East Boston. A memorial was placed nearby.
- On March 17, 1970, Eastern Air Lines Shuttle Flight 1320 was en route to Boston Airport when a suicidal man armed with a revolver stormed the cockpit and shot both pilots. The co-pilot managed to wrestle the gun from the hijacker and shoot him before he died. The wounded pilot managed to land the plane and the hijacker was arrested.
- On July 2, 1976, an unoccupied Eastern Airlines L-188 Electra parked at Boston Logan Airport was destroyed by a bomb planted in the landing gear compartment. No one was injured.
- On September 17, 1979, a McDonnell Douglas DC-9-32 with the registration C-FTLU operating as Air Canada Flight 680 left Boston for Yarmouth, NS. 14 minutes after taking off from Logan, the entire tailcone section of the aircraft separated resulting in rapid decompression at an altitude of 25,000 feet (7,600 m) and leaving a large hole in the rear fuselage. A beverage cart and other items in the cabin were blown out of the aircraft over the Atlantic Ocean, but there were no fatalities or significant injuries. The aircraft safely returned to Boston without further incident. Fatigue cracks were determined to be the cause. Four years later, this same aircraft would be destroyed by a fire on June 2, 1983, as Air Canada Flight 797.
- In the September 11 attacks, two Los Angeles-bound flights, American Airlines Flight 11 and United Airlines Flight 175, originated and departed from Logan Airport. Both flights were hijacked by al-Qaeda terrorists and flown into the Twin Towers of the World Trade Center, ultimately leading to their destruction. American flags now fly over gates B32 and C19, the respective gates that the two planes pushed back from on this day. Under political pressure, acting Governor Jane Swift forced the CEO of Massport to resign, but it was later determined that the failure had been with the airline security checkpoint policy of allowing small knives, and not anything to do with Logan management.
- On June 9, 2005, US Airways Flight 1170 and Aer Lingus Flight 132 narrowly avoided colliding after they were cleared for takeoff nearly simultaneously on intersecting runways by two different air traffic controllers. The crew of the US Airways flight spotted the oncoming Aer Lingus jet and avoided a collision by keeping their own aircraft on the runway past their normal rotation point, allowing the Aer Lingus flight to pass over them. Both flights lifted off safely and continued to their destinations without further incident.
- On January 7, 2013, ground crew workers noticed smoke coming out from the battery compartment in a parked Japan Airlines Boeing 787 Dreamliner at the gate. This fire was caused by overcharged lithium-ion batteries, eventually leading to the grounding of the worldwide Boeing 787 fleet and subsequent redesign of the battery systems.
- On March 5, 2023, on United Airlines Flight 2609 from Los Angeles to Boston, a passenger attempted to open the emergency doors in flight and stabbed a flight attendant who tried to stop him. Upon the flight's landing, the passenger was charged with interference with flight crew members and using a dangerous weapon.
- On September 17, 2024, a Cessna 402, registration N18VV operated by Cape Air destined for Hancock County-Bar Harbor Airport returned to Logan Airport after takeoff due to issues reported with the landing gear. Although only one landing wheel was successfully deployed, the aircraft landed safely and no injuries were reported among the two passengers and one crew member on board.
- On June 12, 2025, JetBlue Flight 312 from Chicago, operating as an Airbus A220-300, went off runway 33-L while landing, stopping in a grassy area. No injuries were reported; flights in to and out of the airport were subsequently delayed for up to two hours.
- On September 16, 2025, Swiss International Air Lines Flight 55 from Boston, operating as an Airbus A330-300, experienced a compressor stall while on take off roll. No injuries were reported; flights in to and out of the airport were subsequently delayed for a short period of time.

== Alternative airports ==
The two historically known alternative airports to Logan are both located outside Massachusetts. Manchester–Boston Regional Airport in Manchester, New Hampshire, is located approximately 56 statute miles (90 km) north-northwest of Logan, an average drive time of 62 minutes via I-90 and I-93. Formerly known as Manchester Airport, it has included "Boston" in its name since April 2006. T. F. Green Airport in Warwick, Rhode Island, is located 60 statute miles (97 km) south-southwest of Logan, averaging 76 minutes from Logan via I-90, I-93, and I-95, or a 100-minute ride via the Silver Line SL1 bus to South Station and then the Providence/Stoughton Line commuter rail to T. F. Green Airport station. Massport does not operate these facilities.

Massport does operate Worcester Regional Airport in Worcester, Massachusetts, which also serves as an alternative to Logan, although not widely known as such. In late 2017, the airport finished construction on a Category IIIb Landing System to allow for arrivals and departures in virtually all weather conditions. The increased reliability, which was a concern for airlines operating at the notoriously foggy airport over the years, was expected to draw additional service. The airport is located 47 statute miles (76 km) due west of Logan, primarily accessed via I-90 and I-290.

== See also ==
- List of airports in Massachusetts
- List of Class B airports in the United States
- List of cities with more than one commercial airport
- Massachusetts World War II Army Airfields
- September 11 attacks
