= Cleveland Island (Massachusetts) =

Island in Barnstable County, Massachusetts, United States

Coordinates: 41°40′20″N 70°28′55″W

Cleveland Island is a small heavily forested island located in Wakeby Pond in Mashpee, Massachusetts. It once belonged to president Grover Cleveland. Cleveland once said that Daniel Webster caught a trout near the island, and then "talked mighty strong and fine to that fish and told him what a mistake he had made, and that he would have been all right if he had left the bait alone.
