= Abnecotants Island =

Island in Nantucket County, Massachusetts, United States

Coordinates: 41.313°N 70.002°W

Abnecotants Island is a very small island in the middle of Squam Swamp in northeastern portion of the island of Nantucket in Massachusetts.
