= Cobble Island (Massachusetts) =

Island in the United States of America

Coordinates: 42°02′03″N 71°50′40″W

Cobble Island is an inhabited island located in Lake Chaubunagungamaug in Webster, Massachusetts. The home on the island dates back to before 1922. There is a large rock that sits at the eastern side of the island. The massive boulder is widely recognized among the town's natives and is often considered Webster's greatest fishing spot. On the island's western side there is a small cove that is often inhabited by an LA-4-200 Lake Buccaneer.

== Other notable names ==
"Cobble"; "The Island"
