= Angelica Rock =

Island in the United States of America

Coordinates: 41.580°N 70.859°W

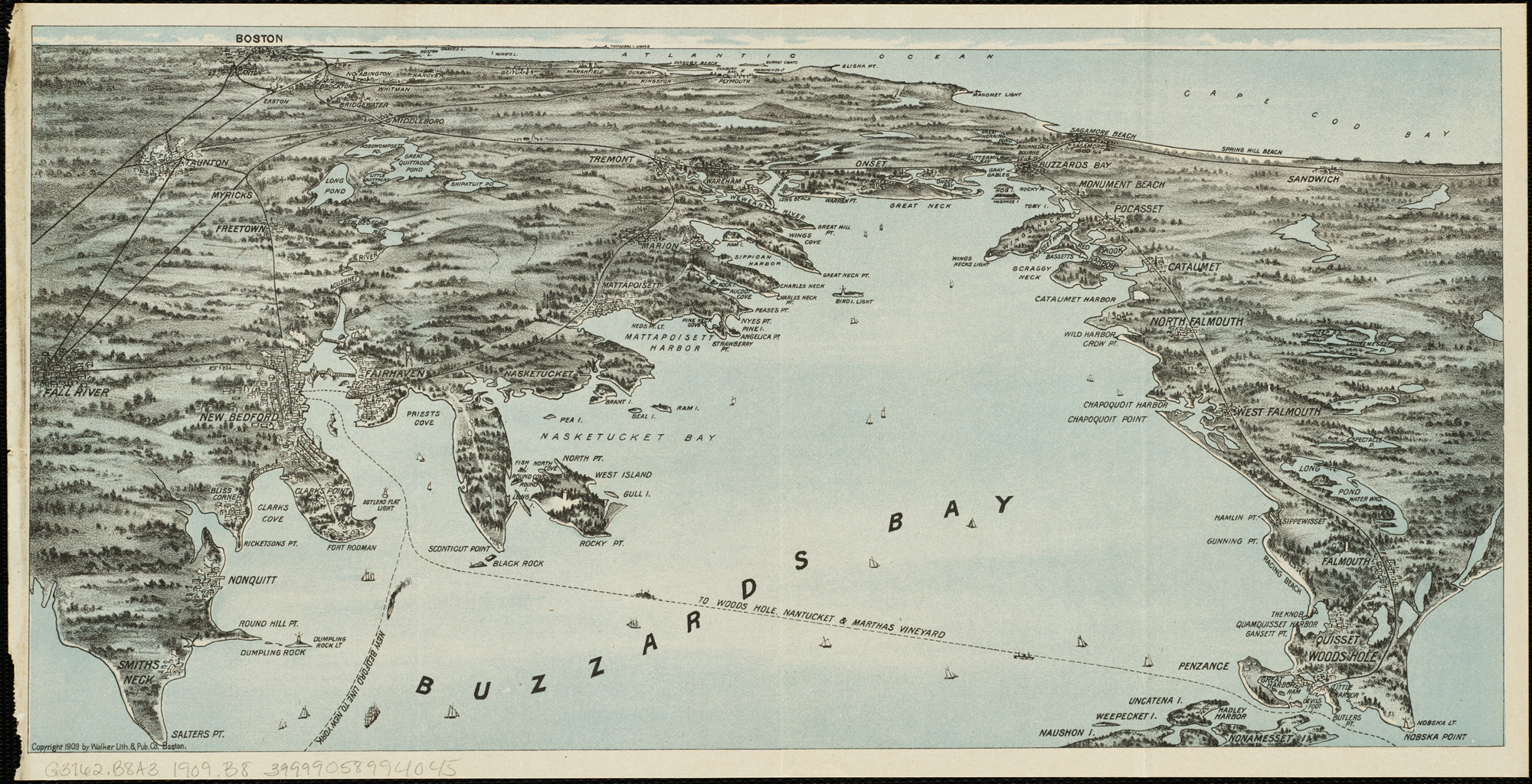
1909 map of Buzzards Bay

Angelica Rock, also known as Angelica Island, is a one-acre (0.4 ha) rock island emerging from Buzzards Bay, within the town limits of Fairhaven, Massachusetts. The rock is privately owned and is located southwest of Sconticut Neck and Wilbur's Point. The island is home to a number of sea birds as well as a collapsed windmill.

== Description, ecology, and nomenclature ==
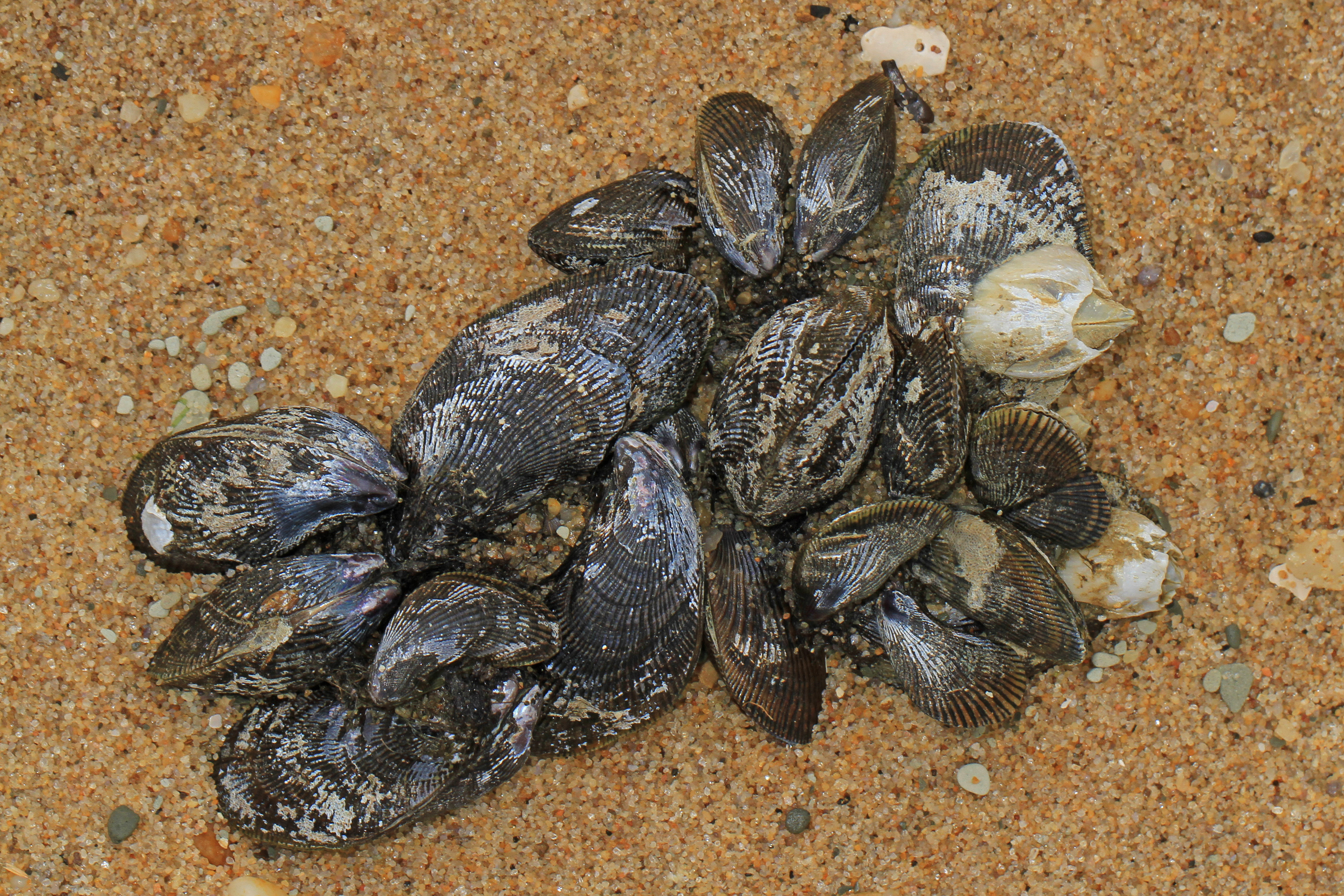
Ribbed Atlantic Mussels

The one-acre island has a rocky beach on its east side and a sandy beach on its north side. The surface is a mixture of rock and sea grass. Ribbed mussels live on the beach's rocks.

The Town of Fairhaven refers to the island as "Angelica Island," while official nautical charts refer to it as "Angelica Rock."

== History and ownership ==
In the early 1970s, the island was purchased by Aris T. Papas, a clinical psychologist and professor who intended to build a summer home there. Papas and his son constructed the windmill by hauling materials via rowboat, and the windmill was functional until the blades were destroyed by a storm months later. However, the summer home plans were abandoned and a concrete slab from the project remains there today. The windmill collapsed in the 2010s.

A family member tried to sell the island in the mid 1990s for about $100,000, but had no buyers. The island has been described as a local landmark and is a frequent subject for photographers. The property is still owned by the Papas family.
