= Crowninshield Island =

Island in Massachusetts, United States

Coordinates: 42°30′50.97″N 70°50′33.52″W

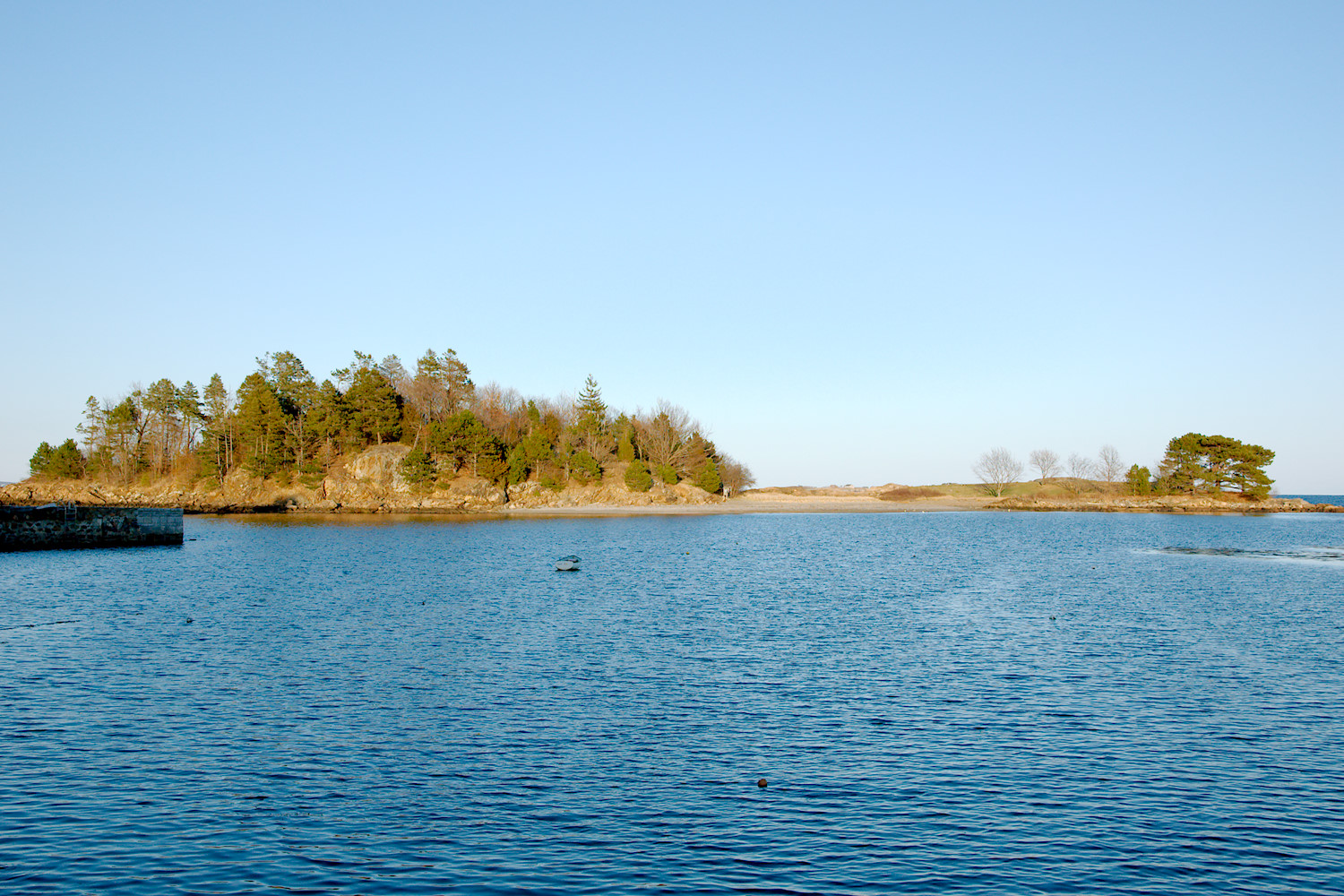
Crowninshield Island viewed from shore near Grace Oliver Beach

Crowninshield Island, also known as Brown's Island, is a small island off the shore of Marblehead, Massachusetts. Since 1955, it has been maintained by The Trustees of Reservations. For all Trustees of Reservations purposes, the island is referred to as Crowninshield Island, however federally the island is still maintained as "Brown's Island", and it remains better known by that name locally.

== Original Owner ==
The island had been owned by the Brown family from 1797-1918. The Massachusetts Trustees of Reservations describe themselves as "the oldest statewide land conservation organization in the country." In honor of Louise E. du Pont Crowninshield, a historic preservationist who married Francis Boardman Crowninshield, a member of the noted Crowninshield family, they suggested to call it Crowninshield Island, honoring the pioneer in America's historic preservation movement from 1925 until her death in 1958. Crowninshield summered at Peach's Point and the family donated the island to the Trustees in 1955. The Crowninshields purchased the island from the Browns for $1 in 1918. The Crowninshields were Boston Brahmins who had been historically powerful in nearby Salem, the original town from which Marblehead was formed.

== Proposed Name Change ==
Early January 2009, Gene Record wrote to selectmen of Marblehead asking to change the name of the island. While the Trustees list it as Crowninshield Island they never had the name officially changed by the U.S. Board on Geographic Names, a federal office maintained by the U.S. Geological Survey. In addition, the Board on Geographic Names doesn't approve a request for a name change unless it comes from the local government.

In his letter, Mr. Record, a relative of the Crowninshields, mentioned their generous support of Marblehead institutions and asked the selectmen to send in their support. The selectmen voted unanimously to oppose the name change.

In 2023, Record tried again to have the name officially changed, and this time it was approved by the selectmen and they intended to submit a proposal to the federal government.

== Physical Features ==
Marking the entrance to Dolliber Cove and Marblehead Little Harbor, Crowninshield Island features a rocky shore, sandy beach, meadow, and salt marsh. There is some anecdotal evidence that it has at times been considered two separate islands, a notion which the topography of the whole would seem to support. Accessible by foot via mudflats during low tide, it is most frequently used as a spot for picnicking and sightseeing, with Grace Oliver Beach, Fort Sewall, Gerry Island, Marblehead Light, and Marblehead Harbor all located in the vicinity.

== See also ==
- List of islands in Massachusetts
