= Barton Island =

Island in Franklin County, Massachusetts, United States

- Interactive map of Barton Island

Geography
- Location: Connecticut River, Massachusetts
- Coordinates: 42°36′10″N 72°32′28″W

Administration
- United States

Barton Island is a small island in the Connecticut River, near Barton Cove, in Gill, Massachusetts, United States. The island is southeast of the Riverside neighborhood and far southwest of the intersection of Chappell Drive and Mohawk Trail (Route 2).

The island is heavily forested in three separate sections.

It is an important bird area and has been a bald eagle nesting site since 1989.
