= Coney Island (Massachusetts) =

Island in Massachusetts Bay, US

Coordinates: 42°31′45″N 70°50′13″W

Coney Island is an abandoned island located in Massachusetts Bay in Salem, Massachusetts. It has light growth, with a small salt marsh.
