= Dole Island (Massachusetts) =

Island in Essex County, Massachusetts, United States

Coordinates: 42°45′15″N 70°49′13″W

Dole Island is an island located in the Parker River in Newbury, Massachusetts. The Parker River National Wildlife Refuge is located on it.
