= Corn Island (Massachusetts) =

Island of Essex County, Massachusetts, US

Coordinates: 42°39′25″N 70°45′05″W

Corn Island is a forested island of Essex County, Massachusetts.
