= Hales Island (Massachusetts) =

Island in Essex County, Massachusetts, United States

Coordinates: 42°45′40″N 71°03′22″W

Hale's Island is a 54-acre (22 ha) island located on the Merrimack River in Haverhill / Bradford, Massachusetts.

The property is part of Silsby's farm.

== Features and history ==
=== Leisure ===
The island has reportedly been home to a golf course, a hotel, and even a small airport. The golf course was destroyed in 1936 when the island flooded. The golf course had a club building. There is still the remnants of a foundation on the island. This was the foundation of the golf course club house. There are also four artesian wells on the island.

=== Bridge ===
There is a stone bridge that connects it to land on the Bradford side. This can barely be seen when the water is low, and impossible when the water is high. The bridge was mostly destroyed in the 1936 flood that destroyed the golf course. The bridge was built to allow cows to move back and forth to the island for grazing.

=== Transport links ===
The island is not listed as an airport on any aeronautical charts. More than likely, that reference is to the area of the River on the north side of the island which was listed for landing seaplanes, and connected to an airfield which was previously located on Coffin Rd where there is now a marina.
