= Wickets Island =

Island in the United States of America

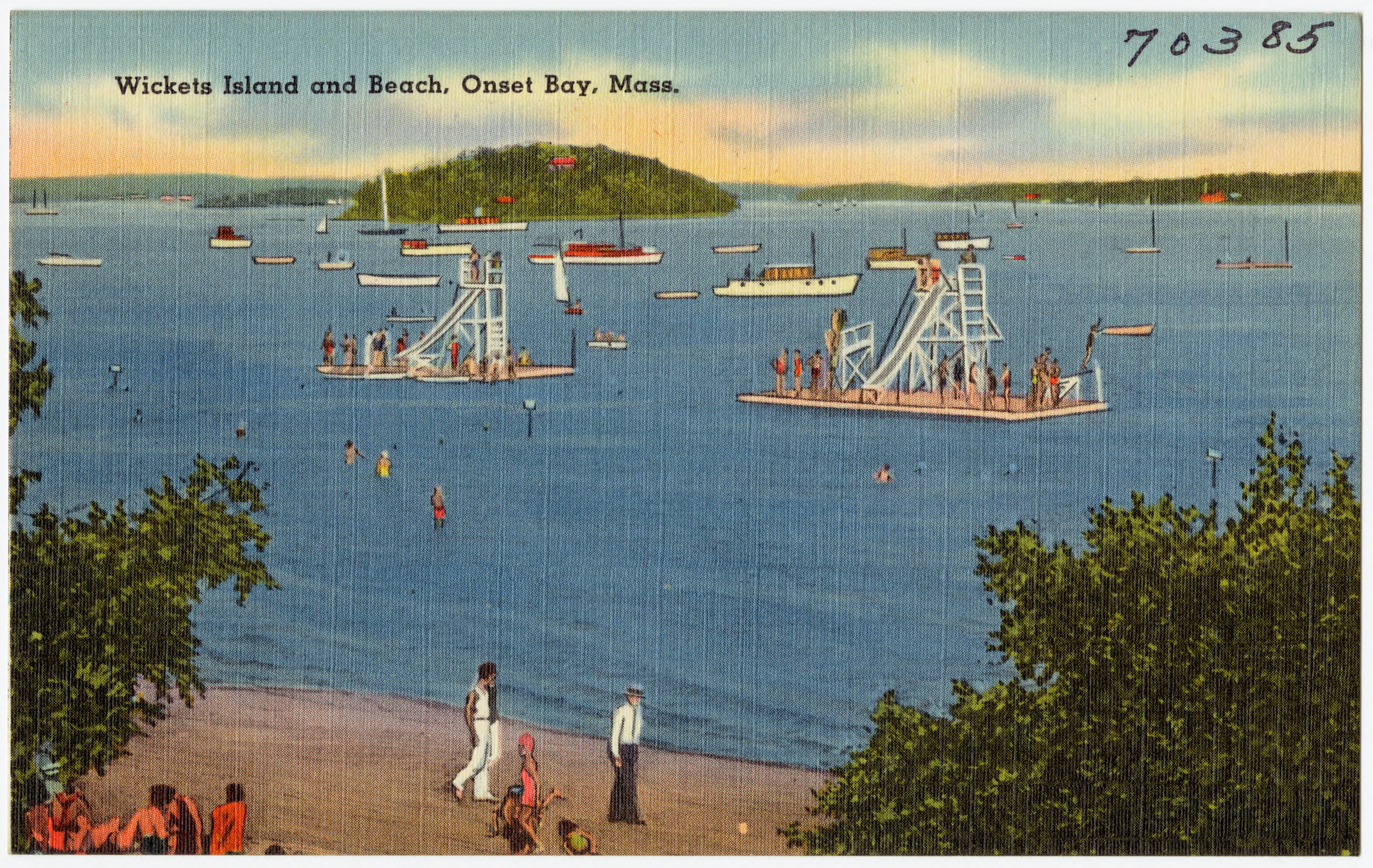
- Postcard view c. 1940s

- Location within Massachusetts

Geography
- Coordinates: 41.7373271°N 70.6536437°W
- Area: 0.0071875 sq mi (0.018616 km^{2})
- Length: 0.1 mi (0.2 km)
- Highest elevation: 40 ft (12 m)

Administration
- United States
- State: Massachusetts
- Municipality: Wareham

Wickets Island is a 4.6 acres (1.9 ha) island located in Onset Harbor in Wareham, Massachusetts. It is located 1,100 feet (340 m) from shore.

== History ==
The island is named for Jabez Wicket, the Wampanoag who is said to have lived there in the late 18th century. The island was created during the end of the last glacial period and is a deposit of glacial moraine made up of coarse sand and soil that is a good producer of plant life, but unsuitable for agriculture. A house occupied Wickets Island from the 19th century until it burned down in 1981.

In 2003, a developer purchased the island with plans to build a luxury home there. The Buzzards Bay Coalition purchased Wickets Island in 2016 as part of the developing Onset Bay Center, an on-the-water exploration center. The island is now permanently conserved and is being restored for public use for boating, paddling, quahogging, swimming, and beach exploration.
