= Clark Island (Massachusetts) =

Island in Massachusetts, United States

Coordinates: 42°08′40″N 73°02′13″W

Clark Island is an island of Massachusetts, located in the Otis Reservoir in Tolland State Forest.
