= Blueberry Island (Massachusetts) =

Island forming part of USA

Coordinates: 42.711°N 72.007°W

Blueberry Island is an inhabited island in Worcester County, Massachusetts. It is surrounded by Lake Monomonac, an artificial lake that straddles the border between Rindge, New Hampshire, and Winchendon, Massachusetts.
