= List of lighthouses in Massachusetts =

This is a list of all lighthouses in the U.S. state of Massachusetts as identified by the United States Coast Guard. Enumeration of the lighthouses in this state is complicated by the number of multiple tower stations and replacement of older towers, with the Brant Point Light station having had nine towers, two of which survive. At present there are forty-seven active towers, of which eleven are privately maintained; thirteen are standing but inactive, seven have been replaced with skeleton towers, thirteen have been destroyed or removed, and one tower has been moved to another state. The oldest station, Boston Light, established in 1716, was the first lighthouse built in the colonies, and the current tower at that station, built in 1783, is the oldest survivor in the state and the second oldest in the nation, and was the last lighthouse automated in the United States. The last station established was at the Buzzards Bay Entrance Light in 1961 (since replaced by an automated light on a steel tripod), but in 1986 the 1818 Great Point Light was rebuilt and relit, making it the last tower constructed in the state. The tallest towers in the state are the two Cape Ann Light towers, but the highest focal plane is at the Hospital Point Range Rear Light, which is located in the steeple of the First Baptist Church of Beverly.

A number of inactivated Massachusetts lights have met with unusual fates. The Three Sisters of Nauset were sold off to separate private buyers before being purchased by the National Park Service and moved back near their original site. Range lights in Nantucket and Hyannis were incorporated into private dwellings, the former housing the Gilbreth family of Cheaper by the Dozen fame. The Point Gammon Light was converted into an observation tower for birdwatching.

If not otherwise noted, focal height and coordinates are taken from the United States Coast Guard Light List, while location and dates of activation, automation, and deactivation are taken from the United States Coast Guard Historical information site for lighthouses. Lighthouses in the "Former" section only include structures that no longer exist.

== Existing lighthouses ==
=== Traditional ===
Name	Image	Location	Coordinates	Year first lit	Automated	Status	Current Lens	Focal Height
Annisquam Harbor Light		Gloucester (Cape Ann)	42.6619°N 70.6815°W	1898	1974	Active	190mm	45 ft (14 m)
Bakers Island Light		Salem	42.5364°N 70.7859°W	1821	1972	Active	190mm	111 ft (34 m)
Bird Island Light		Marion (Buzzards Bay)	41.6694°N 70.7174°W	1819	1997 (Relit)	Active (Inactive: 1933-1997)	ML-300	47 ft (14 m)
Borden Flats Light		Fall River (Taunton River)	41.7044°N 71.1744°W	1881	1963	Active	250mm	47 ft (14 m)
Boston Light		Boston (Little Brewster Island)	42.3280°N 70.8901°W	1783	1998	Active	Second-order Fresnel	102 ft (31 m)
Brant Point Light (old)		Nantucket	41.2898°N 70.0924°W	1856	Never	Inactive (Since 1900)	None	46 ft (14 m)
Brant Point Light (new)		Nantucket	41.2900°N 70.0903°W	1901	1965	Active	Fifth-order Fresnel	26 ft (7.9 m)
Butler Flats Light		New Bedford (Acushnet River)	41.603°N 70.894°W	1898	1978	Active	Fifth-order Fresnel	25 ft (7.6 m)
Cape Ann Light Station (aka: Thacher Island Lights)		Rockport (Thacher Island)	42.6368°N 70.5749°W	1861	1979 (South Tower); 1989 (North Tower)	Active (Note: The "North Tower" was inactive from 1932 to 1989 when it was automated and relit.)	VRB-25	166 ft (51 m)
Cape Poge Light		Edgartown (Chappaquiddick Island)	41.4194°N 70.4523°W	1893 (Note: One or more towers predate the currently listed structure. At this time, there is not enough available information to make an entry under the "Former lighthouses" section for them.)	1943	Active	300mm	65 ft (20 m)
Chatham Light		Chatham	41.6713°N 69.9502°W	1877	1982	Active	DCB-224	80 ft (24 m)
Clarks Point Light		New Bedford	41.5932°N 70.9014°W	1869	2001 (Relit)	Active (Inactive: 1898-2001)	250mm	68 ft (21 m)
Cleveland East Ledge Light		Falmouth	41.6310°N 70.6942°W	1943	1978	Active	190mm	74 ft (23 m)
Derby Wharf Light		Salem	42.5165°N 70.8835°W	1871	1917	Active (Inactive: 1977-1983)	Optic	25 ft (7.6 m)
Duxbury Pier Light		Duxbury (Plymouth Harbor)	41.9874°N 70.6485°W	1871	1961	Active	Fourth-order Fresnel	35 ft (11 m)
East Chop Light		Oak Bluffs	41.4703°N 70.5675°W	1878	1933	Active	300mm	79 ft (24 m)
Eastern Point Light		Gloucester (Cape Ann)	42.5802°N 70.6644°W	1890	1985	Active	DCB-24	57 ft (17 m)
Edgartown Harbor Light		Edgartown	41.3909°N 70.5031°W	1881 (Note: At least 5 different towers have been constructed since the first structure in 1828. The current lighthouse was originally the Ipswich Rear Range Light before it was moved in 1939.)	1939	Active	250mm	45 ft (14 m)
Fort Pickering Light		Salem (Winter Island)	42.5264°N 70.8664°W	1871	1983	Active (Inactive: 1969-1983)	Unknown	28 ft (8.5 m)
Gay Head Light		Aquinnah	41.3484°N 70.8350°W	1856	1956	Active	DCB-224	170 ft (52 m)
Great Point Light		Nantucket	41.3902°N 70.0483°W	1986 (Rebuilt)	Always	Active	VRB-25	71 ft (22 m)
Highland Light		Truro (North Truro)	42.0395°N 70.0609°W	1857	1987	Active	LED	170 ft (52 m)
Hospital Point Range Front Light		Beverly	42.5465°N 70.8560°W	1872	1947	Active	Third-order Fresnel	70 ft (21 m)
Hospital Point Range Rear Light		Beverly	42.5483°N 70.8785°W	1927	Unknown	Active	Unknown	183 ft (56 m)
Ipswich Rear Range Light		Ipswich	42.6853°N 70.7662°W	1881	Never	Removed (Tower Moved)	None	42 ft (13 m)
Long Island Head Light		Boston (Long Island)	42.3302°N 70.9577°W	1901	1929	Active (Inactive: 1982-1985)	Acrylic	120 ft (37 m)
Long Point Light		Provincetown (Long Point)	42.0331°N 70.1687°W	1875	1952	Active	300mm	36 ft (11 m)
Marblehead Light		Marblehead	42.5054°N 70.8337°W	1895	1960	Active	300mm	130 ft (40 m)
Mayo Beach Light		Wellfleet (Mayo Beach)	41.9307°N 70.0343°W	1881	Never	Removed (Tower moved)	None	Unknown
Minot's Ledge Light		Cohasset	42.0331°N 70.1687°W	1860	1947	Active	300mm	85 ft (26 m)
Monomoy Point Light		Chatham (Monomoy Island)	41.559°N 69.994°W	1849	Never	Inactive (Since 1923)	None	47 ft (14 m)
Nantucket Cliff Range Lights		Nantucket	41.294°N 70.107°W	1889	Never	Inactive (Since 1912)	None	Unknown
Nantucket Harbor Range Lights		Nantucket (Brant Point)	41.2898°N 70.0923°W (Front Light); 41.2893°N 70.0919°W (Rear Light)	1908	Unknown	Active	Unknown	35 ft (11 m) (Front Light); 51 ft (16 m) (Rear Light)
Nauset Beach Light		Eastham (Nauset Beach)	41.860°N 69.953°W	1923 (Note: The current tower dates to 1877 when it was built for use in Chatham.)	1955	Active	DCB-224	120 ft (37 m)
Ned Point Light		Mattapoisett	41.6509°N 70.7956°W	1838	1923	Active (Inactive: 1951-1963)	250mm	41 ft (12 m)
Newburyport Harbor Front Range Light		Newburyport	42.8115°N 70.8648°W	1873	1952	Inactive (Since 1961)	None	37 ft (11 m)
Newburyport Harbor Light		Newburyport	42.8152°N 70.8189°W	1898	1951	Active	Fourth-order Fresnel	50 ft (15 m)
Newburyport Harbor Rear Range Light		Newburyport	42.8116°N 70.8662°W	1873	Unknown	Inactive (Since 1961)	None	58 ft (18 m)
Nobska Light		Woods Hole	41.5158°N 70.6551°W	1876	1985	Active	Fourth-order Fresnel	87 ft (27 m)
Old Scituate Light		Scituate (Scituate Harbor)	42.2048°N 70.7158°W	1811	1994 (Relit)	Active (Inactive: 1860-1994)	Replica lantern	70 ft (21 m)
Palmer Island Light		New Bedford	41.6270°N 70.9091°W	1849	1941	Active (Inactive: 1962-1998)	Fifth-order Fresnel	34 ft (10 m)
Plymouth Light		Plymouth	42.0037°N 70.6006°W	1843	1986	Active	100mm	102 ft (31 m)
Point Gammon Light		Hyannis	41.6097°N 70.2662°W	1816	Never	Inactive (Note: Point Gammon Light was converted into a bird watching observation tower in the late 19th century.) (Since 1858)	None	70 ft (21 m)
Race Point Light		Provincetown	42.0623°N 70.2430°W	1876	1972	Active	VRB-25	41 ft (12 m)
Sandy Neck Light		Barnstable	41.723°N 70.281°W	1857	2007 (Relit)	Active (Inactive: 1931-2007)	LED	Unknown
Sankaty Head Light		Nantucket (Siasconset)	41.2844°N 69.9661°W	1850	1965	Active	DCB-224	158 ft (48 m)
Stage Harbor Light		Chatham	41.6587°N 69.9837°W	1880	Never	Inactive (Since 1933)	None	Unknown
Straitsmouth Island Light		Rockport	42.6623°N 70.5881°W	1896	1967	Active	250mm	46 ft (14 m)
Tarpaulin Cove Light		Gosnold (Naushon Island)	41.4688°N 70.7575°W	1891	1941	Active	300mm	78 ft (24 m)
Ten Pound Island Light		Gloucester	42.6019°N 70.6656°W	1881	1934	Active (Inactive: 1956-1989)	250mm	57 ft (17 m)
The Graves Light		Boston (The Graves)	42.3649°N 70.8691°W	1905	1976	Active	VRB-25	98 ft (30 m)
Three Sisters of Nauset		Eastham	41.859°N 69.9571°W	1892	Never	Inactive (Since 1923)	None	Unknown
West Chop Light		Tisbury	41.4808°N 70.5998°W	1891	1976	Active	Fourth-order Fresnel	84 ft (26 m)
West Dennis Light		West Dennis	41.652°N 70.170°W	1855	1989 (Relit)	Active (Inactive: 1914-1989)	300mm	44 ft (13 m)
Wing's Neck Light		Pocasset	41.6802°N 70.6612°W	1889	Never	Inactive (Since 1945)	None	Unknown
Wood End Light		Provincetown (Long Point)	42.0213°N 70.1935°W	1872	1960	Active	VRB-25	45 ft (14 m)

=== Modern ===
The United States Coast Guard lists these as active lighthouses.

Name	Image	Location	Coordinates	Year first lit	Status	Current Lens	Focal Height
Buzzards Bay Entrance Light	—N/a	Buzzards Bay	41.3970°N 71.0347°W	1997	Active	Unknown	67 ft (20 m)
Ipswich Light	—N/a	Ipswich	42.6853°N 70.7662°W	1939	Active	Unknown	42 ft (13 m)

== Former lighthouses ==
Name	Image	Location	Coordinates	Year first lit	Automated	Year deactivated	Light	Focal Height
Annisquam Harbor Light		Gloucester (Cape Ann)	42.6619°N 70.6815°W	1851	Never	1897 (Razed)	Fifth-order Fresnel lens	40 ft (12 m)
Bakers Island Light		Salem	42.5364°N 70.7859°W	1815	Never	1926 (Razed)	Fourth-order Fresnel lens	Unknown
Billingsgate Island Light		Wellfleet (Billingsgate Island)	41.871°N 70.068°W	1858	Never	1915 (Destroyed)	Fourth-order Fresnel lens	40 ft (12 m)
Bishop and Clerks Light		Hyannis	41.5743°N 70.2501°W	1858	1923	1928 (Demolished in 1952)	Fourth-order Fresnel lens	59 ft (18 m)
Boston Light		Boston (Little Brewster Island)	42.3280°N 70.8901°W	1716	Never	1776 (Destroyed)	Tallow candles	75 ft (23 m)
Broad Sound Channel Inner Range Lights		Boston (Spectacle Island)	42.3278°N 70.9842°W (Front Light); 42.3275°N 70.9853°W (Rear Light)	1903	Never	1950 (Removed)	Fourth-order Fresnel lens	53 ft (16 m) (Front); 70 ft (21 m) (Rear)
Buzzards Bay Entrance Light		Buzzards Bay	41.3970°N 71.0347°W	1961	1980	1997 (Dismantled)	Unknown	101 ft (31 m)
Clarks Point Light		New Bedford	41.5932°N 70.9014°W	1818	Never	1906 (Demolished)	Unknown	68 ft (21 m)
Cuttyhunk Light		Gosnold (Cuttyhunk Island)	41.414°N 70.950°W	1891	Never	1947 (Demolished)	Fifth-order Fresnel lens	63 ft (19 m)
Deer Island Light		Boston (Deer Island)	42.3399°N 70.9545°W	1890	1960	1982 (Destroyed in 1984)	Unknown	53 ft (16 m)
Dumpling Rocks Light		Buzzards Bay	41.538°N 70.921°W	1829 (Note: The last "traditional" stone lighthouse was built in 1889.)	Never	1938 (Destroyed)	Fifth-order Fresnel lens	Unknown
Egg Rock Light		Egg Rock (Near Nahant)	42.433°N 70.898°W	1856 (Note: The last "traditional" stone lighthouse was built in 1898.)	1918	1922 (Destroyed in 1927)	Fifth-order Fresnel lens	90 ft (27 m)
Falmouth Inner Light		Falmouth	41.5421°N 70.6083°W	Unknown	Unknown	Unknown	Unknown	25 ft (7.6 m)
Fairhaven Bridge Light		Fairhaven	41.6392°N 70.9175°W	1888	Never	1891 (Razed)	Unknown	Unknown
Great Point Light		Nantucket	41.3902°N 70.0483°W	1817	1955	1984 (Destroyed)	Third-order Fresnel lens	71 ft (22 m)
Hyannis Front Range Light		Hyannis	41.634°N 70.289°W	1885	Never	1929 (Removed)	Fifth-order Fresnel lens	20 ft (6.1 m)
Hyannis Rear Range Light		Hyannis	41.636°N 70.2885°W	1849	Never	1929 (Removed)	Fifth-order Fresnel lens	43 ft (13 m)
Ipswich Front Range Light		Ipswich	42.686°N 70.765°W	1867	Never	1932	Unknown	25 ft (7.6 m)
Long Island Head Light		Boston (Long Island)	42.3302°N 70.9577°W	1844	Never	1881 (Replaced)	Fourth-order Fresnel lens	120 ft (37 m)
Long Point Light		Provincetown (Long Point)	42.0331°N 70.1687°W	1827	Never	1873 (Replaced)	Sixth-order Fresnel lens	36 ft (11 m)
Lovells Island Range Lights		Boston (Lovells Island)	42.3328°N 70.9303°W (Front Light); 42.3319°N 70.9311°W (Rear Light)	1903	Never	1939 (Removed)	None	31 ft (9.4 m) (Front Light); 40 ft (12 m) (Rear Light)
Marblehead Light		Marblehead	42.5054°N 70.8337°W	1835	Never	1895 (Replaced)	Sixth-order Fresnel lens	130 ft (40 m)
Nantucket Beacon		Nantucket	41.273°N 70.073°W	c.1807 (Note: The United States Coast Guard claims Nantucket Beacon was established in 1794. This is disputed by a congressional claim which dates to 1820.)	Never	Unknown	Lanterns	24 ft (7.3 m)
Race Point Light		Provincetown	42.0623°N 70.2430°W	1816	Never	1876 (Replaced)	Fourth-order Fresnel lens	25 ft (7.6 m)
Spectacle Island Range Lights		Boston (Spectacle Island)	42.3281°N 70.9853°W (Front Light); 42.3275°N 70.9844°W (Rear Light)	1897	Never	1913	None	29 ft (8.8 m) (Front Light); 54 ft (16 m) (Rear Light)
Ten Pound Island Light		Gloucester	42.6019°N 70.6656°W	1821	Never	1881 (Replaced)		57 ft (17 m)
Twin Lights		Chatham	41.6713°N 69.9502°W	1841	Never	1877 (Razed)	Fourth-order Fresnel lens	40 ft (12 m)

== See also ==
- List of lighthouses in Maine
- Lighthouses in New Hampshire and Vermont
- List of lighthouses in Rhode Island
- List of lighthouses in Connecticut
- List of lighthouses in New York (state)
