= Egg Rock Light =

Egg Rock Light can refer to:

- Egg Rock Light (Maine) in Frenchman Bay
- Egg Rock Light (Massachusetts) formerly in Nahant, Massachusetts
