= Point Gammon Light =

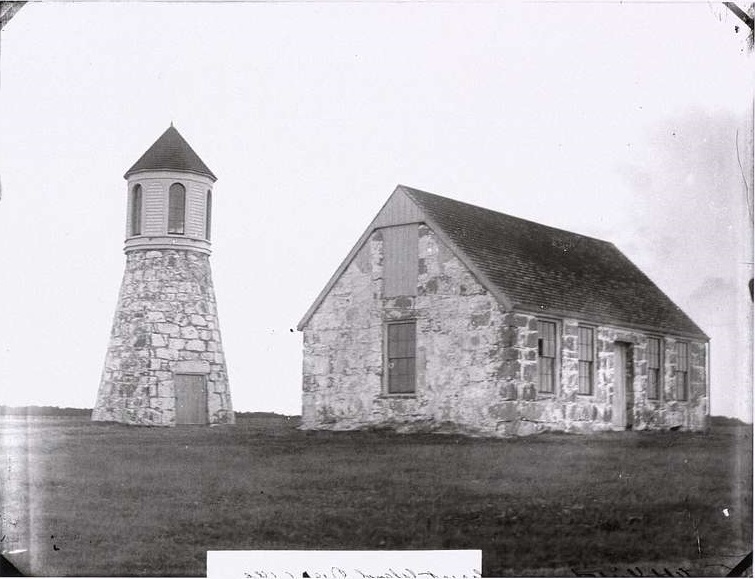
- Postcard of Point Gammon Light. c.1915
- Location: Point Gammon in West Yarmouth, Massachusetts, at entrance to Hyannis Harbor
- Coordinates: 41°36′35″N 70°15′58″W

Tower
- Constructed: 1816
- Foundation: Stone
- Construction: Stone
- Shape: Conical tower

Light
- Deactivated: 1858
- Focal height: 70 ft (21 m)

The Point Gammon Light was a lighthouse that stood on its eponymous point at the south end of Great Island in West Yarmouth, Massachusetts, on the east side of Lewis Bay and the entrance to Hyannis Harbor. Long inactive, it was converted into an ornithological observation tower in the late 19th century.

== History ==
The area around Gammon Point is particularly treacherous, and a petition to Congress led to the construction of a stone tower on the same lines as the Race Point Light. A stone keeper's house was also erected on the site. This tower's light was first lit on November 21, 1816, and kept by Samuel Peak; he was succeeded by his son John, who remained at the station until its closure. The tower was modified somewhat over time, with a brick extension raising the focal height to 70 ft (21 m).

Traffic through the port was heavy, and it was decided to build an offshore tower to replace a lightship at a nearby shoal. This lighthouse, the Bishop and Clerks Light, rendered the Point Gammon Light obsolete, and the latter was deactivated in 1858, the year the new tower was first lit. John Peak moved briefly to the new station but served there only a year.

The abandoned tower remained standing at the point, and with vandalism and other damage there was some thought of demolishing it, though this never came to pass. Instead, the tower was sold in 1872. In 1882 Great Island was purchased by Charles B. Cory, the ornithologist, for use as a game preserve and bird sanctuary. He restored the tower and added a structure on top for bird-watching, replacing the long absent lantern; the keeper's house was used to house his butterfly collection. Cory lost his fortune in a stock market crash, and in 1914 he sold the land to Malcolm Greene Chace, a banker from Rhode Island; the property containing the old light has remained in the family since. In 1935 the keeper's house was dismantled and the stone reused to build a small house elsewhere on the island. The tower itself was updated in the 1970s for use as a summer house, with a new chamber set atop the old stone tower for use as a bedroom. The altered tower remains at the point, though it has not been lit as an aid to navigation for over 150 years.
