= Marblehead =

Marblehead may refer to:

== Places in the United States ==
- Marblehead, Illinois
- Marblehead, Massachusetts
- Marblehead, Ohio
- Marblehead, Wisconsin

== Other uses ==
- Marblehead to Halifax Ocean Race, a biannual sailing race on the North Atlantic
- USS Marblehead, several United States warships named after Marblehead, Massachusetts
- International Marblehead, an international class of radio sailing

== See also ==
- Marblehead Light (disambiguation)
- Marble Head, an historic house in Maryland, United States
