= Hyannis Rear Range Light =

Lighthouse in Massachusetts, United States

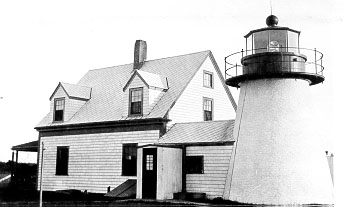
- 1863 replacement lantern
- Location: Hyannis, Massachusetts
- Coordinates: 41°38′10.6″N 70°17′18.6″W

Tower
- Constructed: 1849
- Foundation: Natural/emplaced
- Construction: Brick
- Shape: Conical
- Markings: White with black lantern

Light
- Deactivated: 1929
- Lens: Oil lamp with reflector (1849); 5th order Fresnel lens(1856)

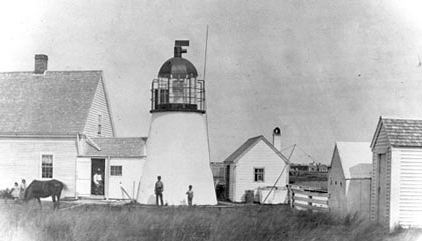
The rear light with its original 1849 birdcage lantern.

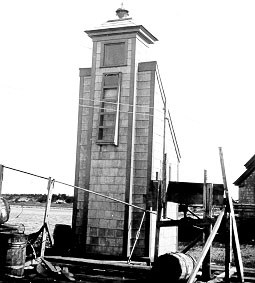
The front range light.

The Hyannis Rear Range Light, also known as the Hyannis Harbor Light, was a lighthouse and, for part of its life, one of a pair of range lights adjacent to Hyannis Harbor. The Range Rear tower was built in 1849 and equipped with a 5th order Fresnel lens in 1856. In 1863 the original birdcage lantern was replaced with a new cast iron one. In 1885, a front range light was added on the Old Colony Railroad Wharf, and the two lights together served to leading vessels to the wharf. The 20 foot Range Rear tower is shorter than most lighthouses, as its purpose was just to guide ships to the wharf. In the early 1800s, the railroad extended from its current terminus at the Hyannis Transportation Center, down what is now Old Colony Road (named after the railroad) to Harbor Road, where it ended in the 300 foot wharf that was a busy area for shipping coal, lumber, grain and fish.

Over time, as the channel into the adjacent Lewis Bay was dredged deeper, there was a shift of traffic into Lewis Bay and Hyannis inner harbor, and the wharf fell into disuse. The lights were discontinued in 1929 and the front range light has disappeared along with the wharf, although the outline of the wharf can still be seen in aerial photographs.

The lantern was removed from the rear light before it was sold. In 1987 a new, much larger lantern room was added to the top of the tower by local carpenter Theodore Ingemanson. The lighthouse is now privately owned but can be seen on Google Street view or directly from Harbor Road in Hyannis.

== Keepers ==
- Daniel Snow Hallett (1849–1851)
- James Bearse (1851–1853)
- Almoran Hallett (1853–1861)
- Franklin Baker (1861–1869)
- John Lothrop (1869–1878)
- Alonzo Lothrop (1878–1899)
- John Peak (1899–1915)
- Waldo Leighton (1915–1929)
