= Clarks Point Light =

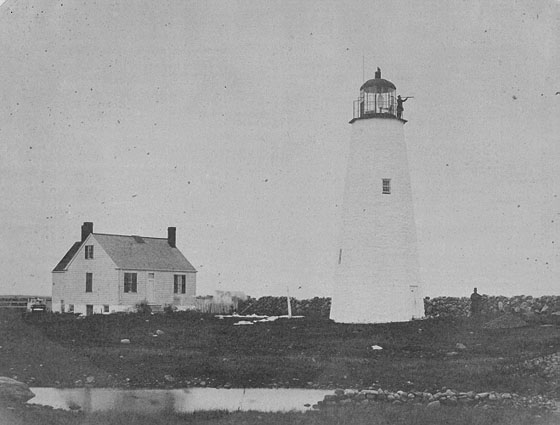
- the 1818 tower
- Location: New Bedford, United States
- Coordinates: 41°35′35.44″N 70°54′4.86″W

Tower
- Constructed: 1797
- Foundation: Stone
- Construction: Stone and wood
- Automated: 2001
- Shape: Short cylindrical tower on stone and wood rectangular building on granite fort
- Markings: White with black lantern
- Fog signal: none

Light
- First lit: 1869 (current tower)
- Deactivated: 1898-2001
- Focal height: 68 feet (21 m)
- Lens: 9.8 inches (250 mm)
- Range: 9 nautical miles (17 km; 10 mi)
- Characteristic: Fixed White

The Clarks Point Light is located in New Bedford, Massachusetts. Originally constructed as a wooden tower, it was replaced with a stone tower in 1804. This in turn was replaced by a structure on the parapets of Fort Rodman which was deactivated in 1898. After restoration in the early 1970s, it was relit again in 2001 by the city as a private aid.

== History ==
The first light at this location was erected in 1797 by a group of local merchants, New Bedford at the time being a center of the whaling industry. This tower, constructed of wood, lasted only a year before it was destroyed in a fire; its successor was also privately erected, but was turned over to the federal government in 1800, having been lit the previous year. This tower lasted somewhat longer, apparently destroyed by lightning in 1803. The following year a 38 feet (12 m) stone tower was erected; this was rebuilt somewhat in 1818, increasing the height of the tower. Various upgrades to the tower were performed over the years including new lamps and an octagonal lantern. There was no keeper's dwelling at the site until 1842.

Starting in 1857, construction on Fort Taber (also known as Fort Rodman) begin adjacent to the lighthouse. The fort became obsolete following the civil war, and construction was finally halted in 1871, though the stone superstructure was essentially complete by the end of the war. The walls were found to obscure the lighthouse beacon from some quarters, and therefore a new lighthouse was built on the fort itself. This was a small wooden structure with the lantern set on its hipped roof. Special swinging frames were provided for the lantern to minimize the risk of damage when the fort's cannons were fired, but these were never put to the test. The old tower was abandoned and was eventually demolished in 1906. By that time the Butler Flats Light had been established next to the shipping channel, and the light on the fort was rendered obsolete; the Clarks Point keeper was transferred to the new light in 1898, and the old light was extinguished.

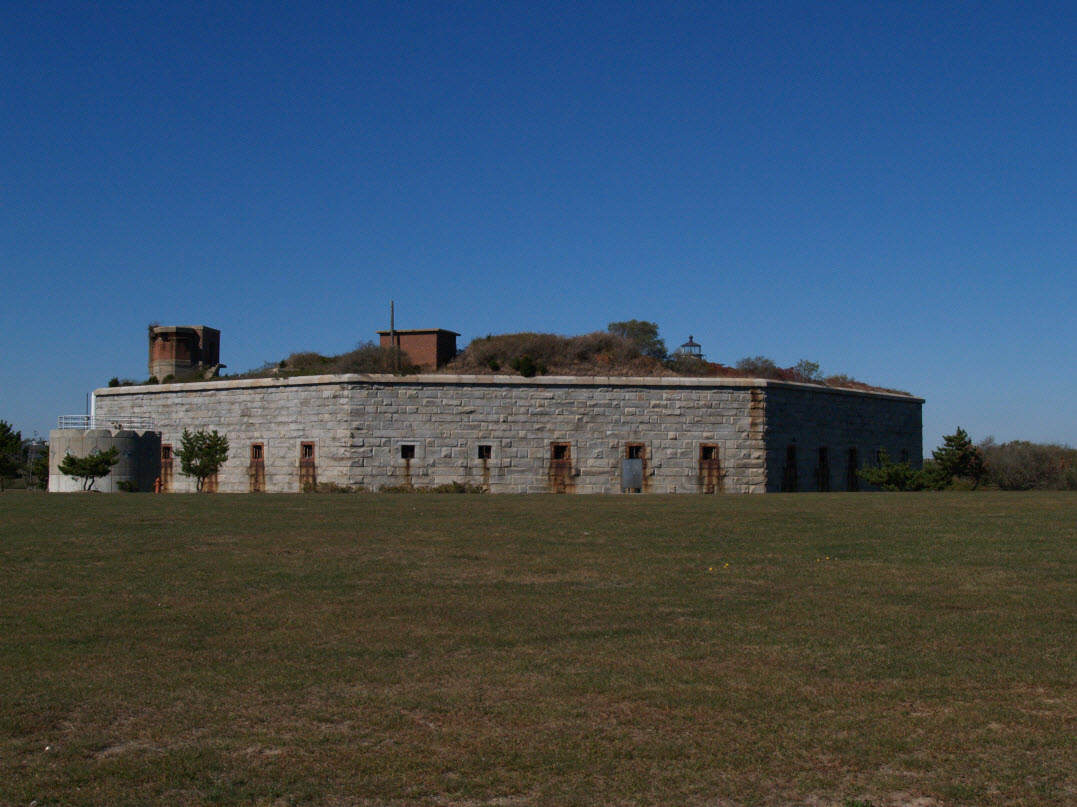
The lantern of the lighthouse is barely visible over the right center of the fort.

It remained perched on the fort, however, and in the early 1970s it was restored along with the remains of the fort. Nonetheless it was badly damaged by vandals. In the late 1990s the city restored the area around the fort as a park, and in 2001 the lighthouse was rebuilt and relit, along with two other lighthouses. In 2015 the Coast Guard rescinded its license due to lack of care and no longer operates as a private aid to navigation.
