= Marblehead Light =

The name Marblehead Light may refer to one of two historic lighthouses in the United States:

- Marblehead Light (Massachusetts) in Marblehead, Massachusetts
- Marblehead Light (Ohio) in Marblehead, Ohio
