= Fairhaven Bridge Light =

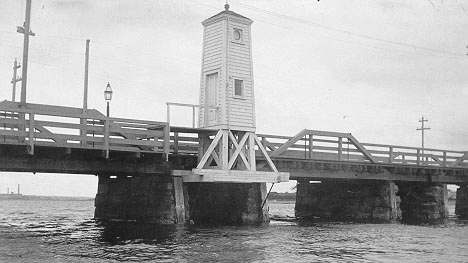
- US Coast Guard photo
- Location: Fairhaven, Massachusetts
- Coordinates: 41°38′21.9″N 70°55′0.89″W

Tower
- Constructed: 1888
- Foundation: Mounted on bridge
- Shape: Square Wood Tower
- Markings: White

Light
- Deactivated: 1891
- Characteristic: Red

Fairhaven Bridge Light was a lighthouse on the bridge from New Bedford to Fairhaven, Massachusetts, at the north end of New Bedford Harbor. From 1888 to 1891 it served as the rear light of a range to guide ships past Butler Flats on the west side of the harbor entrance. The front light of the range was Palmer Island Light. It was also known as "Fairhaven Bridge Range Light".

This light was discontinued in 1891; the range was obviated by the construction of the Butler Flats Light adjacent to the channel in 1898 The structure and the wooden bridge shown under it in the photo no longer exist.
