= Edgartown Harbor Light =

Lighthouse in Massachusetts, United States

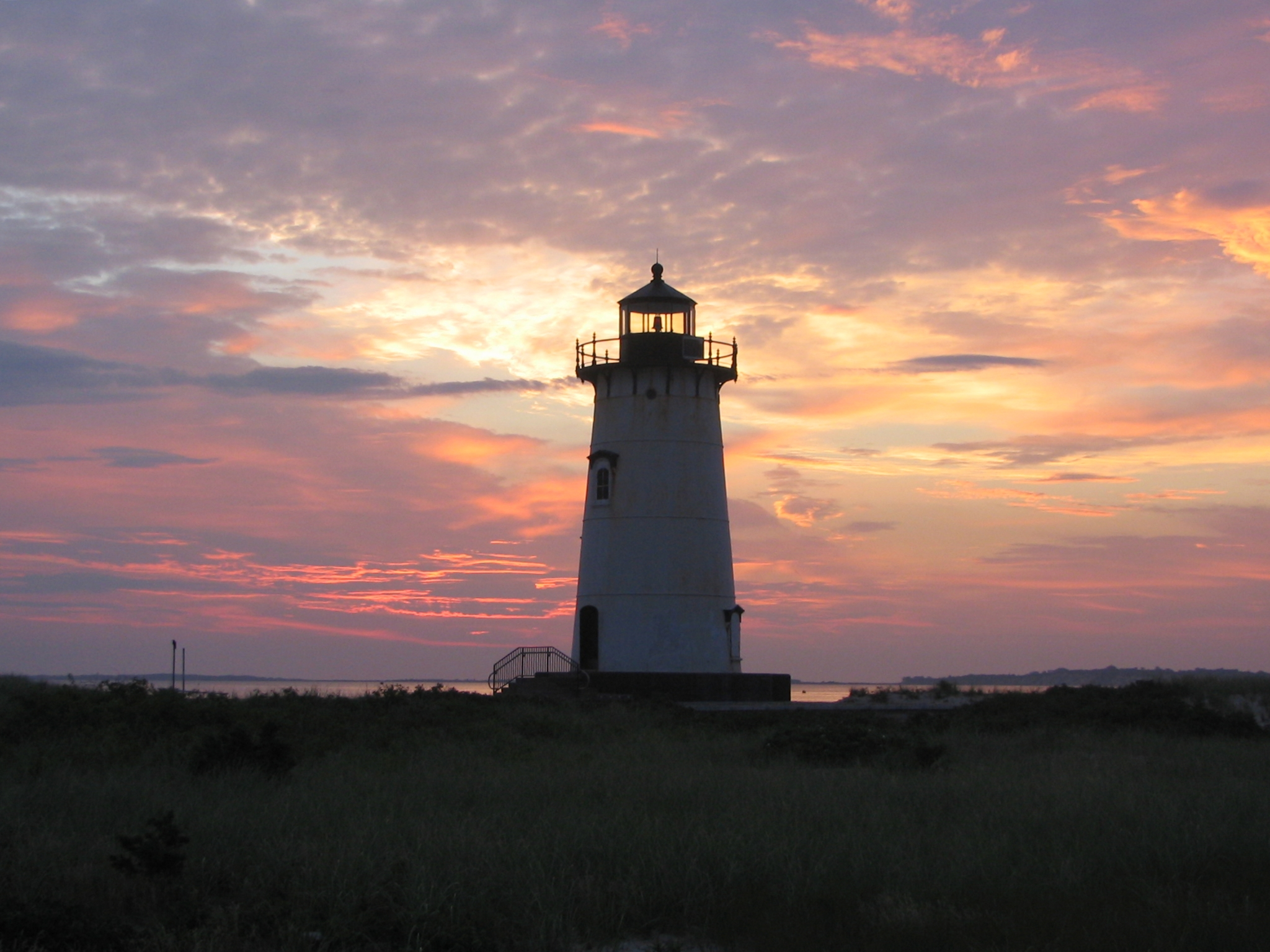
- Edgartown light at dawn, July 2006.
- Location: Off N. Water St., Edgartown, Massachusetts
- Coordinates: 41°23′27.05″N 70°30′10.88″W

Tower
- Constructed: 1828
- Foundation: Granite blocks
- Construction: Cast iron
- Automated: 1939
- Height: 13.5 m (44 ft)
- Shape: Conical
- Markings: White with black lantern
- Heritage: National Register of Historic Places listed place

Light
- First lit: 1939 (current structure)
- Focal height: 45 feet (14 m)
- Lens: Fourth order Fresnel lens (original), 9.8 inches (250 mm) (current)
- Range: 5 nautical miles (9.3 km; 5.8 mi)
- Characteristic: Fl R 6s
- Edgartown Harbor Light
- U.S. National Register of Historic Places
- Area: 0.3 acres (0.12 ha)
- Built: 1875
- Architectural style: Italianate
- MPS: Lighthouses of Massachusetts TR
- NRHP reference No.: 87001465
- Added to NRHP: June 15, 1987

Edgartown Harbor Light is a lighthouse located in Edgartown, Massachusetts, United States, where it marks the entrance to Edgartown Harbor and Katama Bay. It is one of five lighthouses on the island of Martha's Vineyard. The first lighthouse, a two-story wooden structure that also served as the keeper's house, was constructed in 1828. It was demolished, and replaced by the current cast-iron tower, in 1939. Originally located on an artificial island 1/4 miles (~ 400 meters) from shore, the lighthouse is now surrounded by a beach formed, since 1939, by sand accumulating around the stone causeway connecting it to the mainland.

== History ==
The Edgartown Harbor Light was the first lighthouse constructed at the Edgartown Harbor entrance. The first light was built in 1828 when Congress appropriated $5,500 so the federal government could purchase a plot of land from Seth Vincent for $80, and build a light at the entrance of Edgartown Harbor. The necessity for a lighthouse at this location was precipitated by the large number of vessels frequenting the harbor during the whaling boom of the late 1700s and early 1800s.

The original Edgartown Light was a wooden, Cape Cod Style, two-story Keeper's house built on wood spiles a short distance offshore in shallow water. For the first two years of service, this offshore location required the Keeper to row a short distance. In 1830 Congress approved $2,500 for a wooden causeway to be constructed. This wooden causeway was colloquially known as the "Bridge of Sighs." A term that reflected the emotions of island people as they stood on the walkway watching whaling ships depart for voyages that lasted up to five years. The initial Edgartown lighthouse featured a glass lantern room protruding from the middle of the gabled roof of the Keeper's residence. This lantern room contained a fixed white light that was visible for about 14 miles. In 1850 Congress appropriated $5,000 for construction of a new causeway with a walkway on top. In 1856, after the Keeper's house was damaged by fire, the house was rebuilt, and the light replaced with a fourth-order Fresnel lens. During the 1860s – multiple repairs and renovations were done, including: rooms re-papered, 2 iron smokestacks raised, sills of the keeper's house were replaced and the house was whitewashed, the walkway was repaired. In the 1890s, the fuel and storehouse were built; a new oil house was constructed; a fence was built around the pier, and a new well was dug. This first Edgartown Light was destroyed in the Hurricane of 1938. In 1939, the United States Coast Guard demolished the existing buildings and installed an 1881 vintage cast-iron tower relocated from Ipswich Rear Range Light. When reconstructed at the mouth of Edgartown Harbor, the relocated conical tower was fitted with the fourth-order Fresnel lens, electrified, and automated.

== Rescued from destruction ==
From 1939 through to the early 1980s, the automated Edgartown Harbor Light was maintained by the United States Coast Guard. Due to U. S. Coast Guard Congressional funding shortages through the 1970s and early 1980s, various lighthouses around the United States were destroyed or designated for destruction. Such designation was due to the high expense of maintaining the structures, and because the lights no longer served as vital aids to navigation. This obsolete status of the lighthouses was facilitated by enhanced satellite GPS and other electrical maritime navigation aids. Documentation of lighthouses destroyed in recent history is available from Lighthouse Digest, which maintains a record of destroyed lighthouses as well as a "Doomsday List" of threatened lights. According to the 2012 "Doomsday List" published by Lighthouse Digest, there are currently 43 lighthouses in the U.S. listed for destruction in the near future. Due to such funding shortages, the Edgartown Harbor Light and two other Martha's Vineyard lighthouses (Gay Head Light and East Chop Light) were designated for destruction by the federal government in the early 1980s. As in other similar lighthouse removal projects, the United States Coast Guard would dismantle or raze the existing lighthouse and often replace the light with a low-maintenance iron spindle structure top-mounted with a strobe light.

The three threatened lights on Martha's Vineyard were saved through federal petition and Congressional testimony by Vineyard Environmental Research, Institute's (VERI) founding board member and President, William Waterway Marks, and, Chair, John F. Bitzer, Jr. VERI was a nonprofit organization co-founded in 1984 by William Waterway Marks and Fairleigh S. Dickinson, Jr., to undertake cutting-edge environmental research of acid rain; sea-level rise; shellfish resources; coastal erosion; Great Pond, wetland, and barrier beach ecosystem dynamics, and aquifer (groundwater) protection. During and after the Congressional hearings, VERI's effort to save the island's three iconic lighthouses received support from Congressman Gerry Studds, and Senator Ted Kennedy. Shortly after the Congressional hearings, the United States Coast Guard issued a 35-year license for the three lights to VERI in 1985.

This was the first time in U.S. history that control of "active" lighthouses was transferred to a civilian organization. On similar note, this was the first time in the history of Martha's Vineyard that control of any of its five lighthouses was in the hands of an island organization. After receiving the lighthouse license, the Institute undertook a series of fundraising activities that engaged the community of Martha's Vineyard, including local supporters and celebrities such as co-founding board member, Fairleigh S. Dickinson, Jr., and board members, Jonathan Mayhew, whose whaling family ancestor's were the Vineyard's first European settlers; Vineyard Gazette co-owner, Jody Reston; philanthropist, Flipper Harris; Margaret K. Littlefield; the actress, Linda Kelsey; WHOI Director, Derek W. Spencer, and John F. Bitzer, Jr.. Speakers and performers appearing at these lighthouse events were renowned historian, David McCullough; Senator Ted Kennedy; Caroline Kennedy; Edward M. Kennedy, Jr.; Congressman Gerry Studds; singer/songwriter, Carly Simon; Kate Taylor; Livingston Taylor; Hugh Taylor; Dennis Miller from Saturday Night Live; Bill Styron's wife, Rose Styron - who read one of her original lighthouse poems; United States Navy Rear Admiral, Richard A. Bauman; renowned photographer, Alfred Eisenstaedt and comedian, Steve Sweeney. The proceeds from the lighthouse benefits were applied to a major restoration of the Edgartown Harbor Light. In 1988, the light's exterior was restored to its previous white-dressed elegance, and the dysfunctional double-barreled fog horn was removed. In 1990, the fourth-order Fresnel was replaced with a smaller red plastic lens, and the light was converted from grid electric power to solar power.

Before and after restoration by Vineyard Environmental Research, Inst.
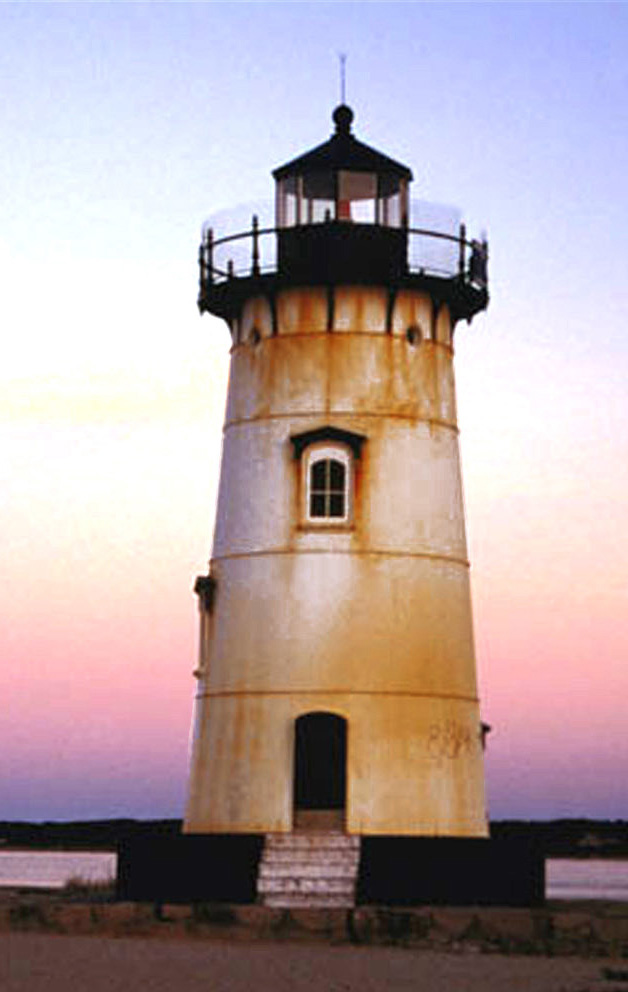
circa 1986

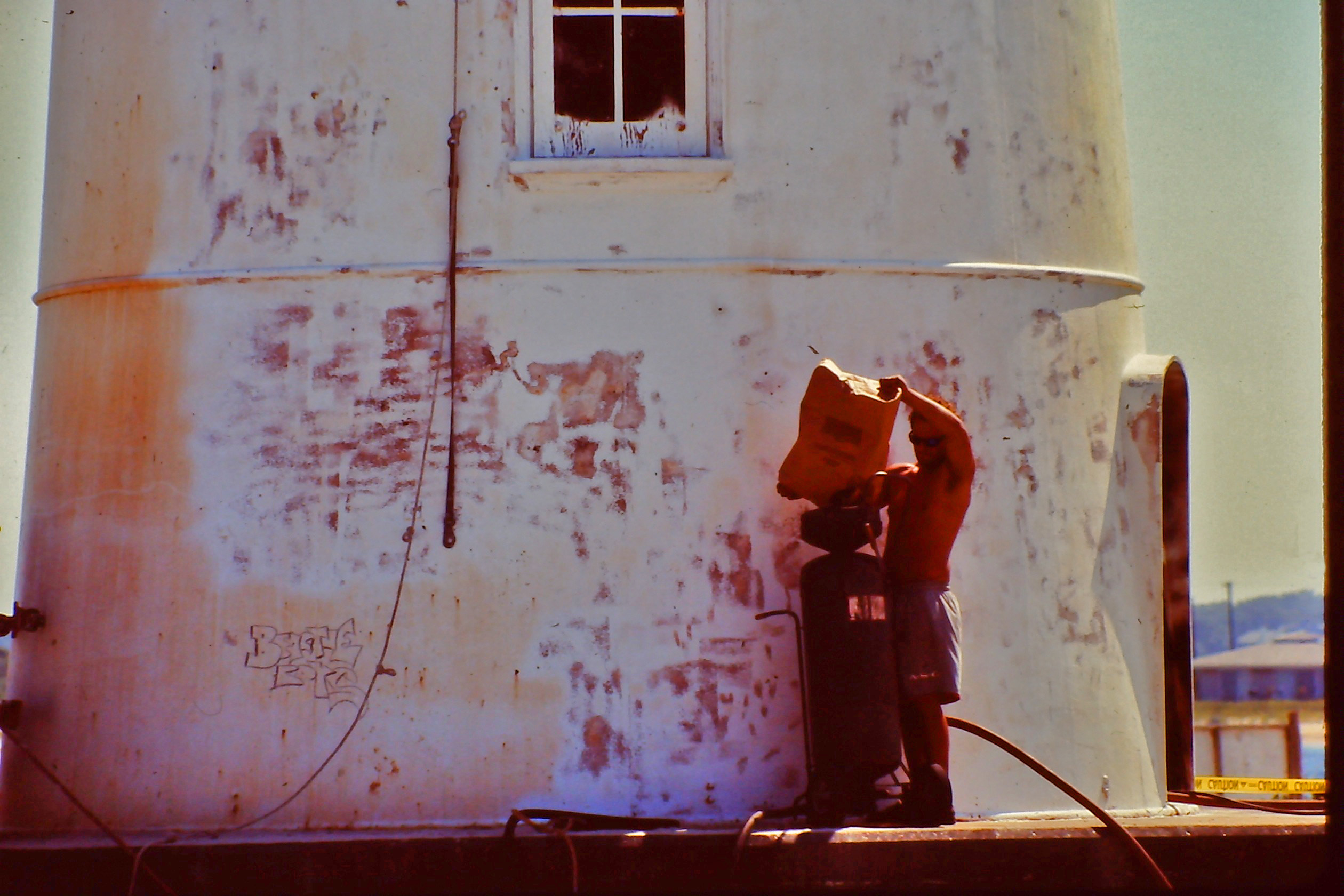
blasting graffiti & rust - 1988

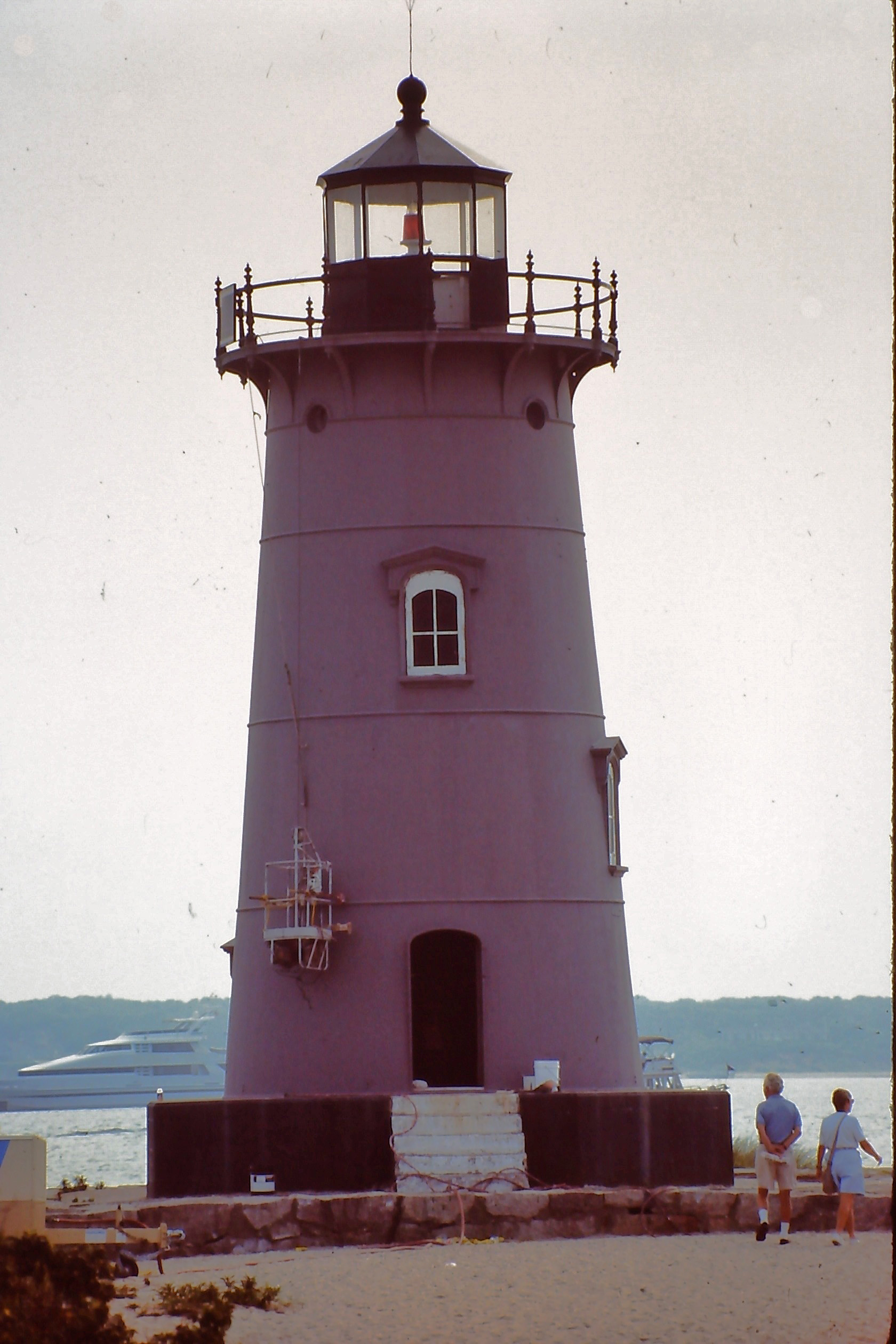
brown primer - 1988

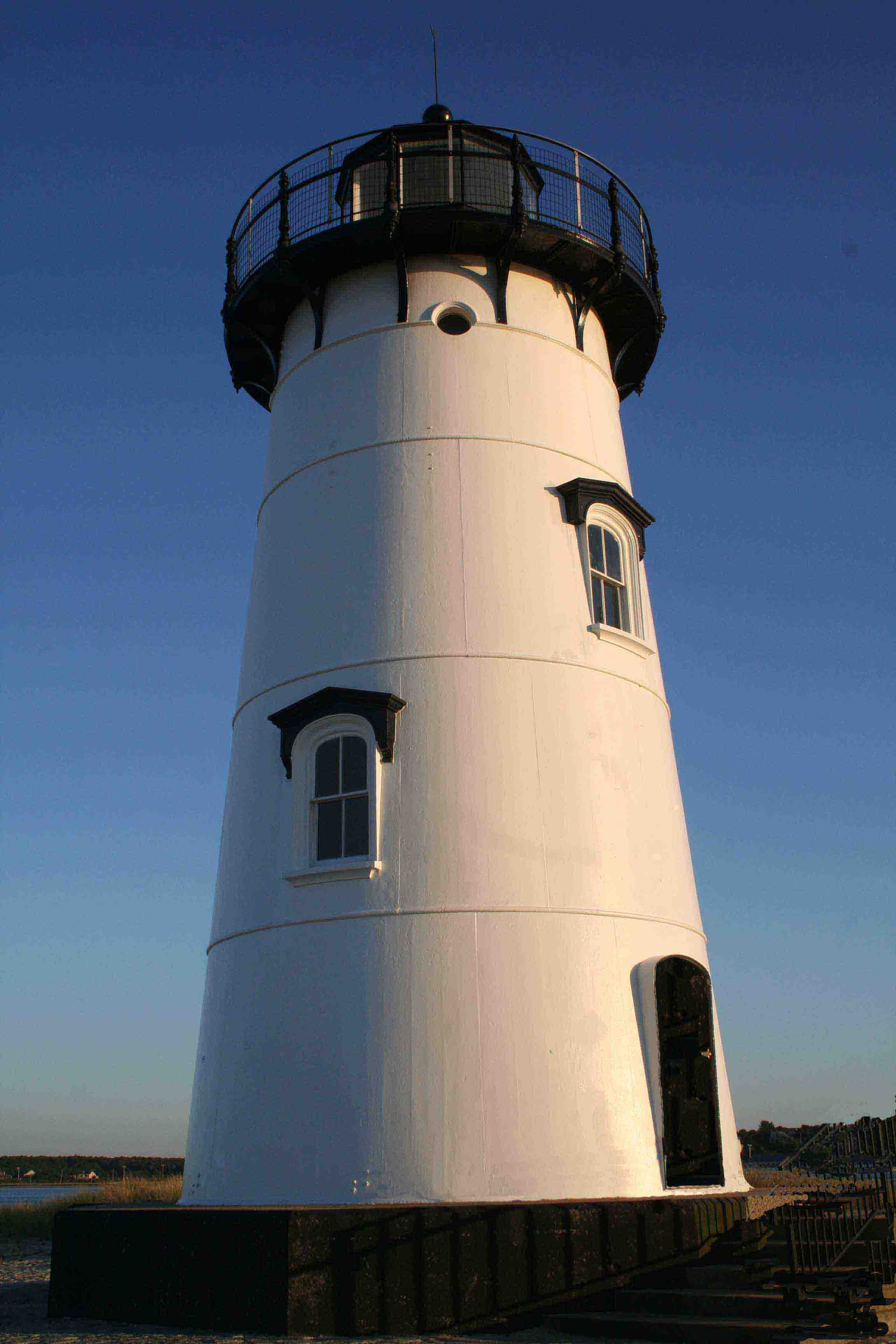
new paint - 1988

== From bridge to barrier beach ==
From the Edgartown lighthouse's initial construction in 1828 until its demise in 1938, the Edgartown Harbor Light was accessible to guests and visiting public. During its first year, the Cape Cod Style two-story Keeper's house with its lighthouse lantern room was accessible only by rowing a boat from nearby waterfront land. In 1830, Congress approved funds to construct a new lantern room along with a wooden bridge for easier access (see photo - right). This wooden causeway eventually became known as the infamous "Bridge of Sighs." In 1847 this wooden bridge was replaced by a rap and stone causeway. Prior to 1830, the lighthouse Keeper; his family; guests; and visiting public had to row a short distance to access the lighthouse.

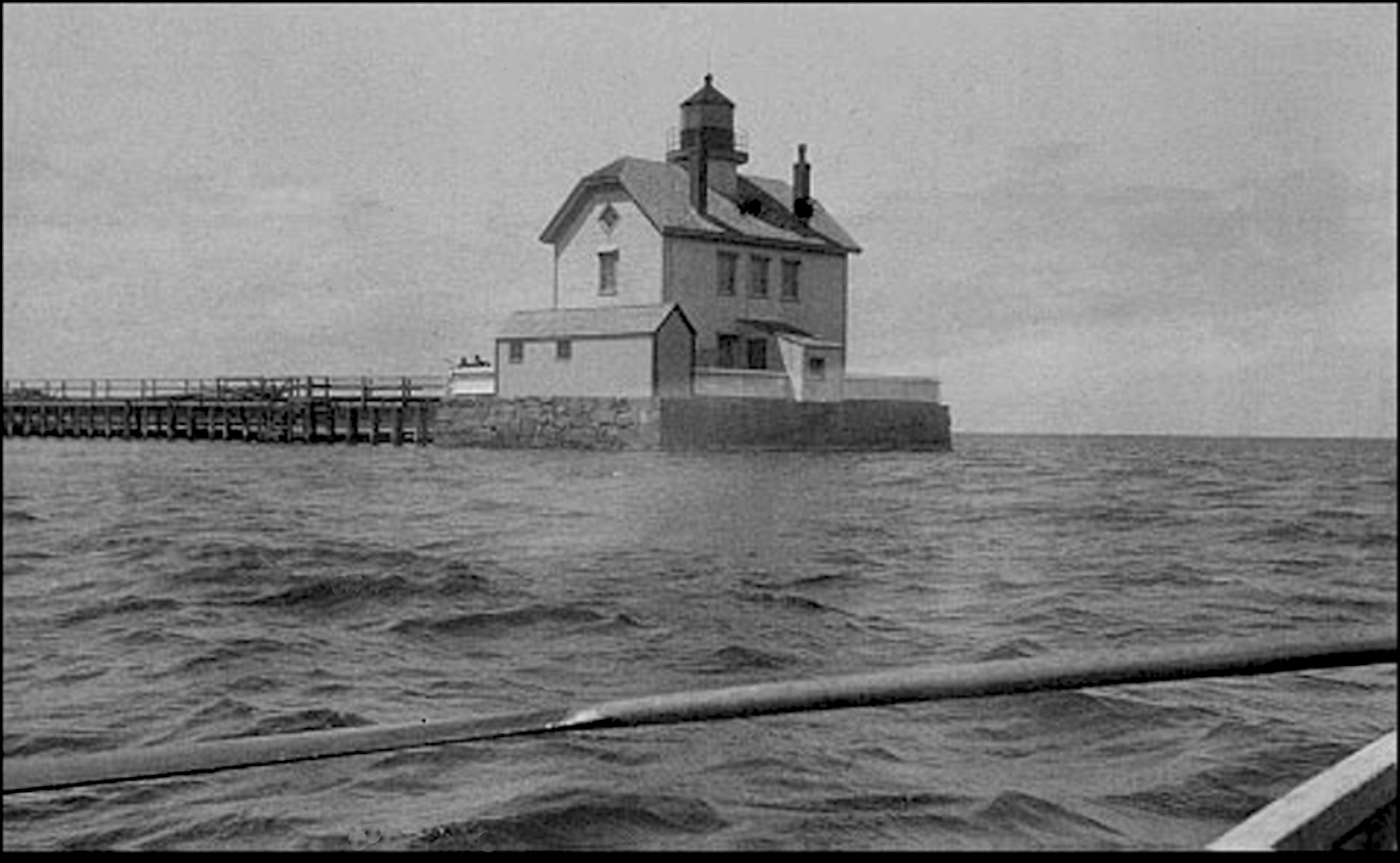
Circa 1830 - Edgartown Harbor Light with new lantern room and rebuilt wooden bridge during time Jeremiah Pease was Principal Keeper.

The 1908 USGS topographic map below depicts conditions of the Eel Pond barrier beach located northwest of the Edgartown Light. This same 1908 illustration shows how the Edgartown lighthouse is surrounded by water except for the wooden access causeway. In the 1950s, due to a series of hurricanes, the barrier beach stretching between Eel Pond and Nantucket Sound was destroyed. A large volume of the destabilized Eel Pond barrier beach sand was carried southeasterly by prevailing littoral drift toward the Edgartown Light area. Eventually, the sands dropped out of suspension and created a barrier beach surrounding Edgartown Harbor Light. This so-called "Lighthouse Beach" surrounding Edgartown Harbor Light continues to exist today, and serves as a barrier beach between Nantucket Sound and Lighthouse Pond.

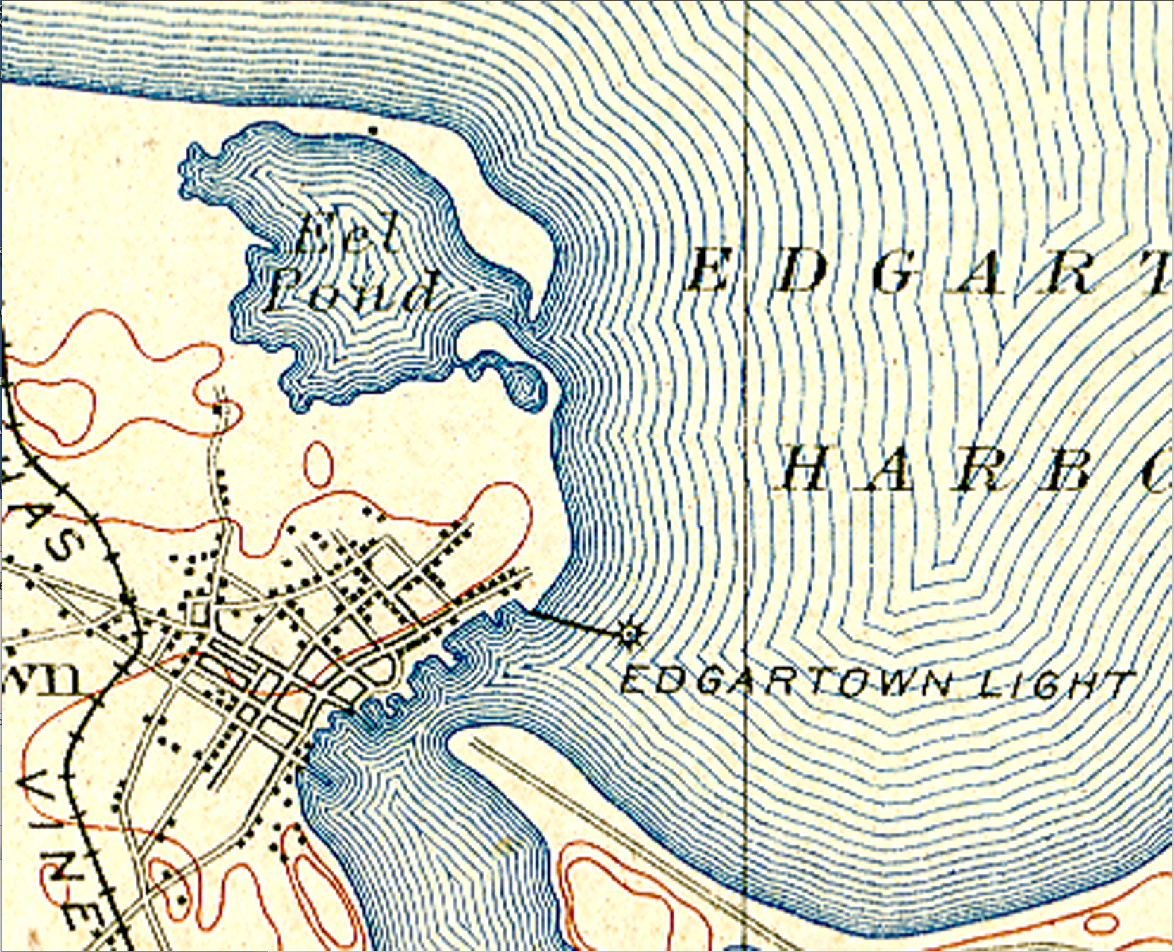
1908 USGS topo map depicting Edgartown Light surrounded by water and connected to land by the public access causeway known colloquially as "The Bridge of Sighs".

As depicted in the photograph to right, the first Edgartown lighthouse (constructed 1828) featured a glass lantern room protruding from the middle of the gabled roof of the Keeper's residence. This lantern room contained a fixed white light that was visible for about 14 miles. This same basic structure, with attached Keeper's house, served as the Edgartown lighthouse from 1828 to 1938.

In 1938, as a result of the Hurricane of 1938 - the Edgartown Harbor Light was closed to public access due to severe structural damage caused to the lighthouse and its access causeway. In 1939, the new conical cast-iron tower from Ipswich was installed and automated. Due to automation and related removal of the resident lighthouse Keeper, there was no longer a built-in system for accommodating public access. Subsequently, the Edgartown lighthouse was closed to public access from 1938 to 1988.

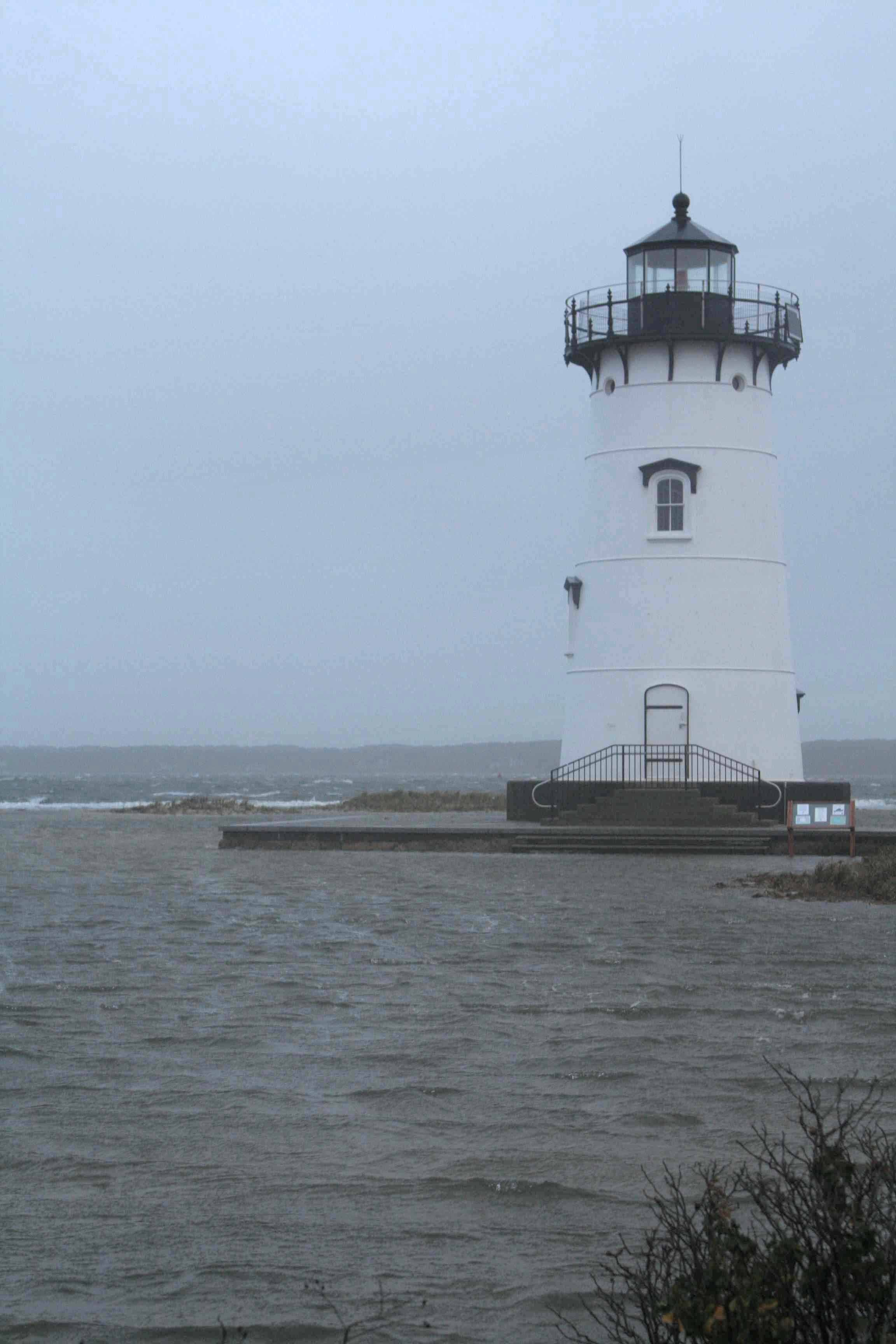
Edgartown Harbor Light surrounded by Hurricane Sandy flood waters during full-moon tidal cycle: 29 October 2012.

August 1991, Hurricane Bob caused severe damage to the rap and stone public access causeway to the Edgartown Light. VERI initiated restoration of the causeway by raising funds from property owners abutting Lighthouse Pond. VERI board member, Fairleigh S. Dickinson, Jr., who owned a home abutting Lighthouse Pond, was instrumental in organizing donations from his fellow neighbors. The donated funds were applied toward engineering and permitting efforts, as well as structural rebuilding of the causeway. Necessary engineering; permit applications; public hearings; material acquisition, and reconstruction oversight was performed at no cost to VERI or the community by Vineyard Environmental Protection, Inc.(VEP). An important component of the new causeway's engineering design was the addition of a second culvert to facilitate tidal flushing of Lighthouse Pond. The rebuilding of the public access causeway was completed in November 1991.

October 29, 2012 - storm surge from Hurricane Sandy struck Martha's Vineyard during two full-moon tidal cycles. The photograph to right was taken at approximately 6:00 PM on 29 October 2012 prior to the peak of the 8:30 PM tidal cycle. This photo depicts the Edgartown Harbor Light being surrounded by storm surge flood waters generated during the Hurricane Sandy event. During "normal" conditions, the lighthouse is surrounded by acres of vegetated sandy beach. The hurricane's velocity currents, wave overwash, and flooding caused damage to the lighthouse's public access causeway.

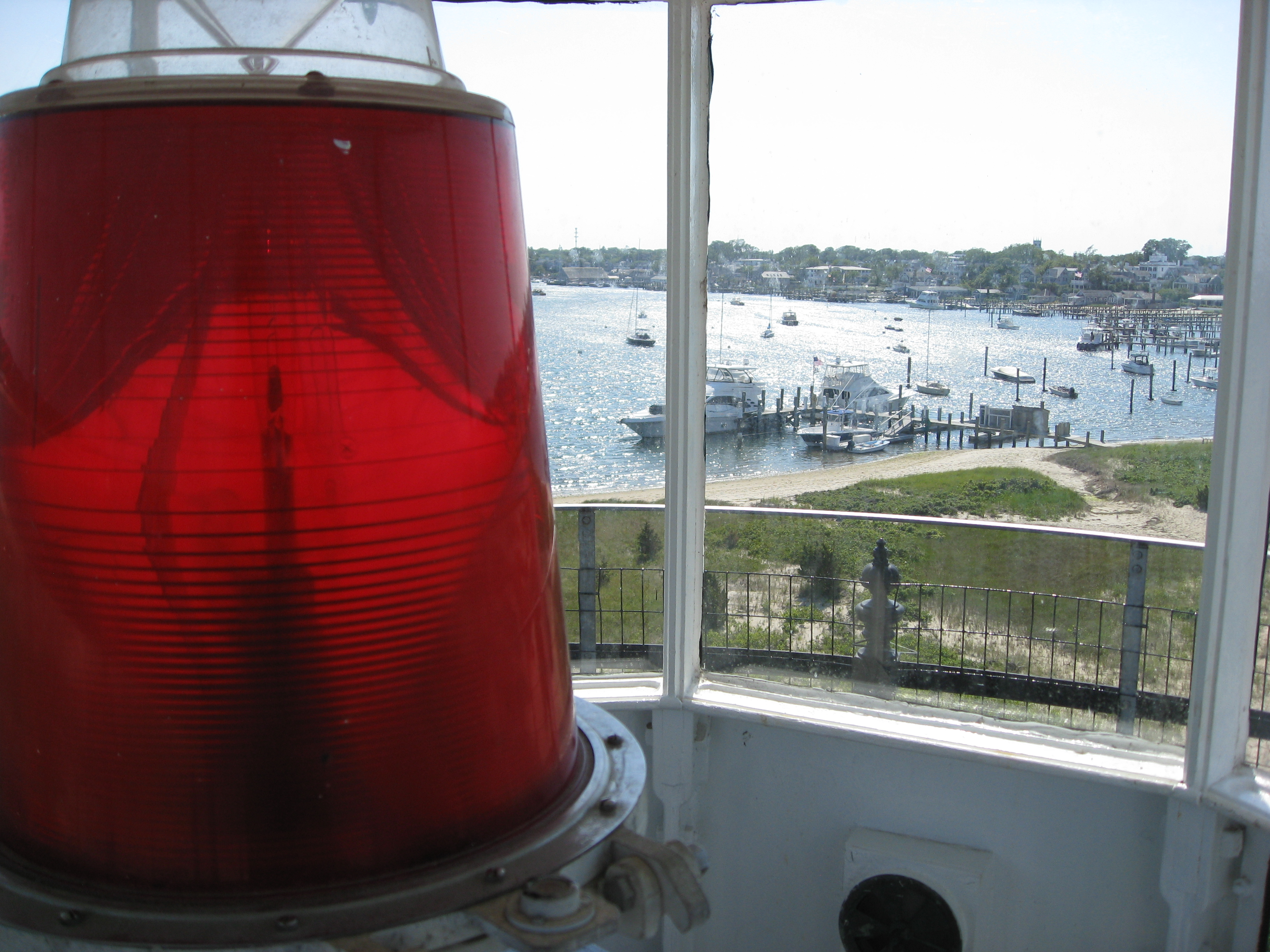
View of the lens of the Edgartown Harbor Light, with Edgartown Harbor in the distance.

== Preservation and public access ==
In 1985, the Edgartown Light was licensed by the United States Coast Guard to Vineyard Environmental Research, Institute (VERI). In 1987, while under VERI management, the Edgartown Harbor Light was placed on the National Register of Historic Places as Edgartown Harbor Light. The following year (1988), after completion of its restoration, VERI opened the lighthouse to limited public access for the first time in fifty-five years, using local volunteers to staff it on weekends and for special events. Under VERI's management, the lighthouse became a site for community events such as July 4 fireworks and the decorating the light with a large wreath - created community cultural events at the Edgartown Harbor Light that continue to take place annually. Public access to the light room and balcony, however, were severely limited because of the physical challenges of climbing the near-vertical wrought iron ladder inside the tower that provided the only means of reaching them.

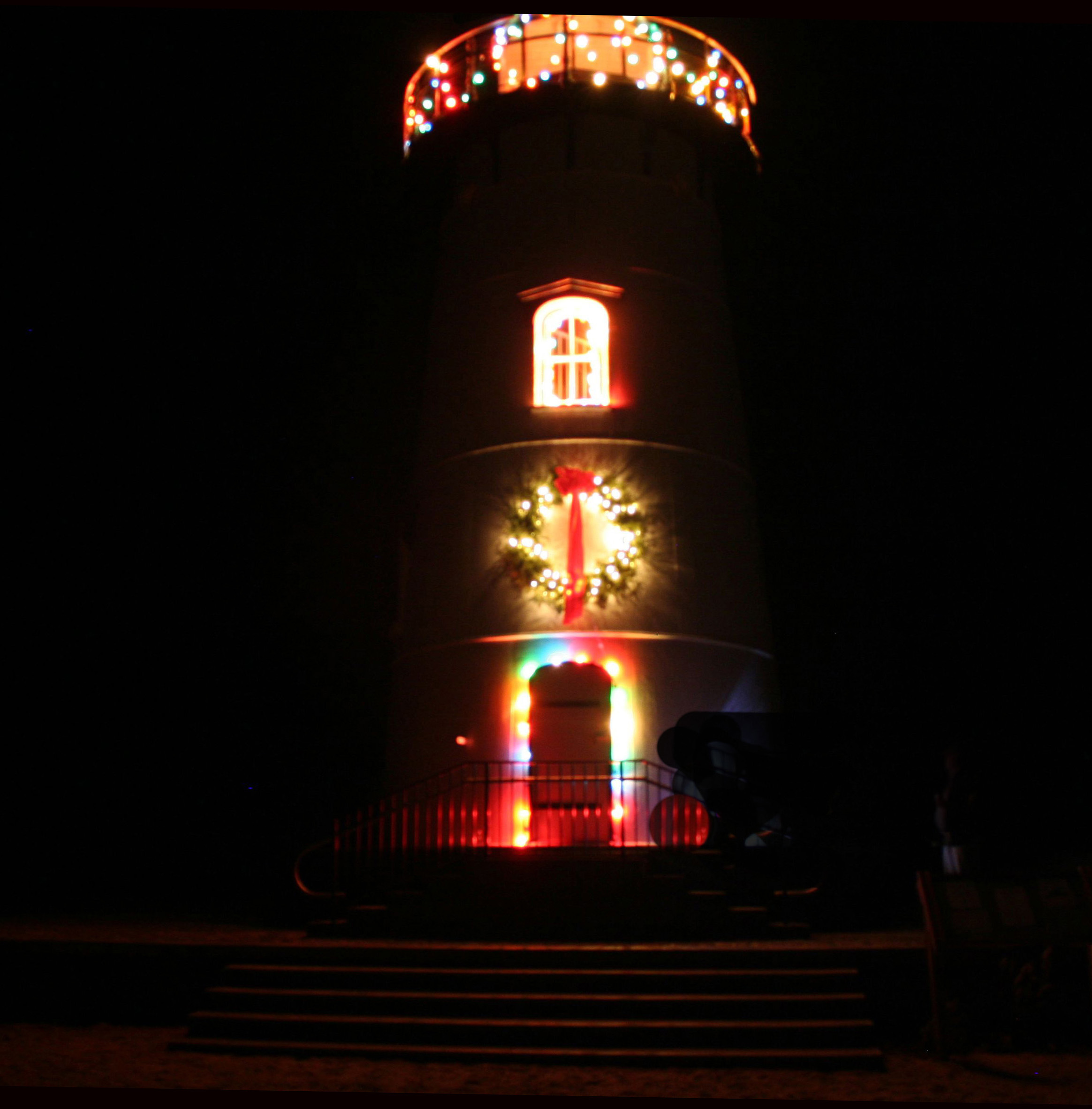
Edgartown Light with holiday decoration by MV Museum, December 2012, continuing a tradition begun by VERI in 1987.

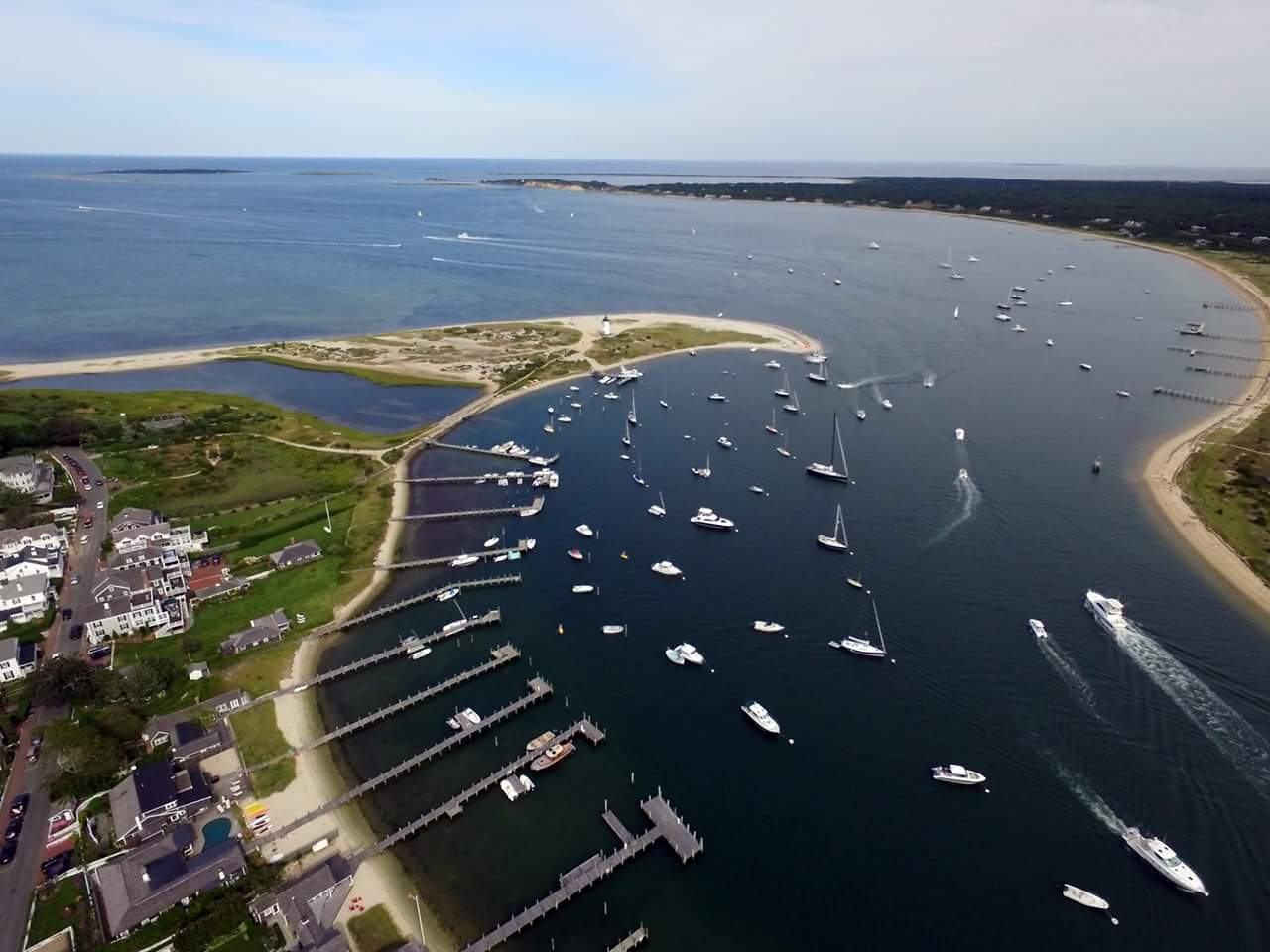
Lighthouse Beach in Edgartown Harbor

Stewardship of the lighthouse was transferred from VERI to the Martha's Vineyard Historical Society, now the Martha's Vineyard Museum, in 1994. Between 2005 and 2007 the Museum, with the help of a $250,000 contribution from the Town of Edgartown, rebuilt the stone foundation of the lighthouse as a children's memorial and installed a spiral staircase to provide access to the light room and balcony. The Edgartown Harbor Light is now open to the public weekends from late May to early October, as well as weekdays in July and August.

In May 2011, the Edgartown Harbor Light was declared by the United States Coast Guard (USCG) to be no longer critical to its mission of safeguarding lives and property at sea. The lighthouse was listed for disposal as excess property. The Town of Edgartown began the process of acquiring it under the National Historic Lighthouse Preservation Act, presenting its bid to the federal government's General Services Administration in January 2013. The transfer process was completed a year later, and in January 2014, the town officially took possession of the lighthouse, paying the government the symbolic sum of one dollar. The Martha's Vineyard Museum has continued to act as steward of the lighthouse, as it does for the East Chop Light, and to provide public access during the summer months.

== Edgartown Harbor Light keepers ==
- Jeremiah Pease (Principal Keeper 1828-1841 and 1843–1849)
- Sylvanus Crocker (Principal Keeper 1841-1843 and 1849–1853)
- William Vinson (Principal Keeper 1853-1855)
- James Blankenship (Principal Keeper 1855-1861),
- William Vincent (Principal Keeper 1861-1866)
- Zolmond Steward (Principal Keeper 1866- 1870)
- Benjamin Huxford (Principal Keeper 1870-1919)
- Joseph H. Barrus (Principal Keeper 1919-1931)
- Henry L. Thomas (Principal Keeper 1931-1938)
- Fred Vidler (Principal Keeper 1938)
- William Waterway Marks (Principal Keeper 1985–1994)
- Fairleigh S. Dickinson, Jr. (Principal Keeper 1985-1994); Lane Lovell (Assistant Keeper 1986-1994)
- Wade Johnson (Principal Keeper 2009–present).

== See also ==
- National Register of Historic Places listings in Dukes County, Massachusetts
