= Great Point Light =

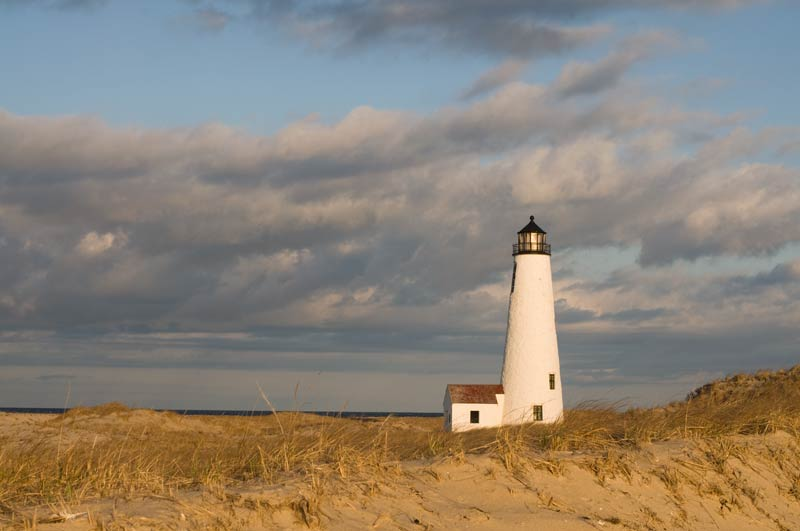
- Location: Great Point, the northerly extremity of Nantucket, Massachusetts Island, southerly side of the easterly end of Nantucket Sound.
- Coordinates: 41°23′24.6″N 70°2′53.8″W

Tower
- Constructed: 1769
- Foundation: Concrete
- Construction: Stone, Concrete and Plastic
- Automated: circa 1955
- Height: 70 feet (21 m), 71 feet (22 m) above sea level.
- Shape: Cylindrical
- Markings: White tower with covered way and white framed dwelling, black lantern room, small white oil-house to southward of dwelling
- Heritage: National Register of Historic Places listed place
- Fog signal: None

Light
- First lit: 1986 (current tower replaced destroyed 1818 tower)
- Deactivated: 1984, rebuilt 1986
- Focal height: 71 feet (22 m)
- Lens: Third order Fresnel lens (original), VRB-25 system (current)
- Range: white 14 nautical miles (26 km; 16 mi), Red 12 nautical miles (22 km; 14 mi)
- Characteristic: Flashing white 5s with a red sector from 084° to 106°. Covers Cross Rip and Tuckernuck Shoals.
- Nantucket Light
- Formerly listed on the U.S. National Register of Historic Places
- NRHP reference No.: 82005272

Significant dates
- Added to NRHP: April 28, 1982
- Removed from NRHP: 1986

Great Point Light, officially Nantucket Light, is a lighthouse located on the northernmost point of Nantucket Island. First built in 1784, the original wooden tower was destroyed by fire in 1816. The following year a stone tower was erected which stood until toppled in a storm in March 1984. Rebuilt again in 1986, the stone tower was built to replicate the old one, and still remains in operation today. Modern additions include solar panels to recharge the light's batteries, and a sheet pile foundation and 5-foot (1.5 m) thick concrete mat to help withstand erosion.

The lighthouse sits on a thin spit of beach where the currents of the Atlantic Ocean and Nantucket Sound meet.

It was added to the National Register of Historic Places in 1982 as Nantucket Light and removed after the destruction of the listed structure in 1986.

== See also ==
- Lightship Nantucket
