= Dumpling Rocks Light =

Historic lighthouse in Massachusetts, United States

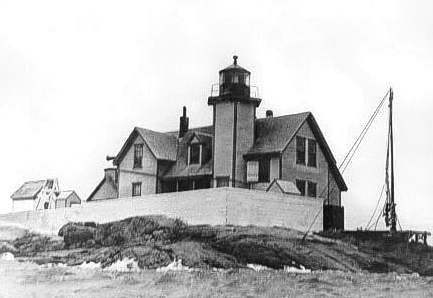
- US Coast Guard photo of the 1889 structure
- Location: Dumpling rocks, Barnstable County, United States
- Coordinates: 41°32′18″N 70°55′17″W

Tower
- Constructed: 1889
- Height: 14 m (46 ft)
- Shape: square wood tower attached to house
- Markings: White (tower), black (lantern)
- Fog signal: Second class Daboli trumpet, 1 every 15s

Light
- First lit: 1889
- Deactivated: 1942
- Focal height: 16 m (52 ft)
- Lens: fourth order Fresnel lens, fifth order Fresnel lens
- Characteristic: F WR
- Dumpling Rocks Light 7
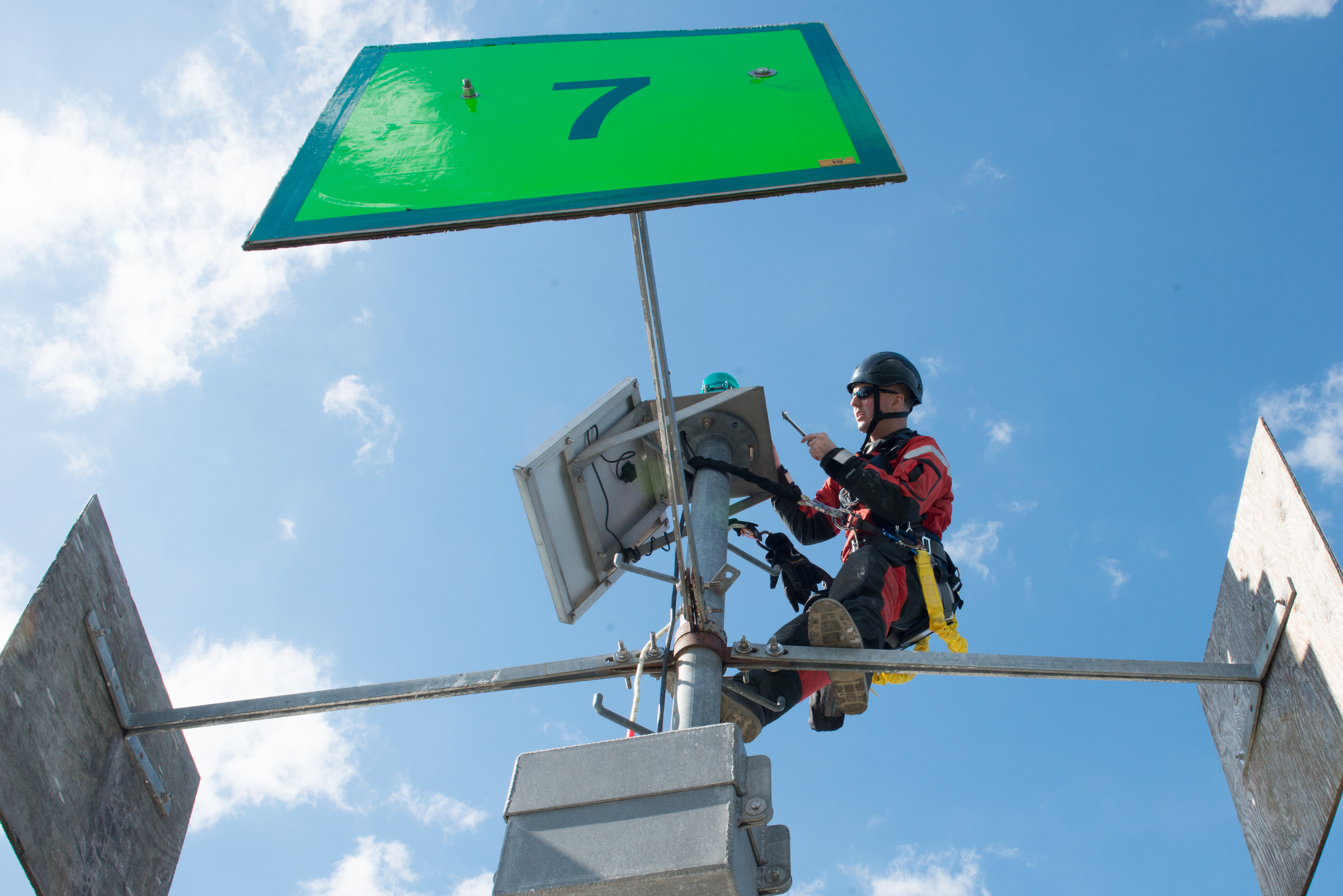
- An electrician replaces the lantern with a self-contained LED light in 2016
- Constructed: 1942
- Construction: skeleton tower
- Markings: square green daymark
- Fog signal: none
- Focal height: 52 ft (16 m)
- Range: 8 nmi (15 km; 9.2 mi)
- Characteristic: Fl G 6s

Dumpling Rocks Light is a light on a skeleton tower on Dumpling Rock, Buzzards Bay, Massachusetts. It replaced the wooden Dumpling Rock Light, built 1889, which had replaced the original stone lighthouse established in 1829.
