= Ipswich Range Lights =

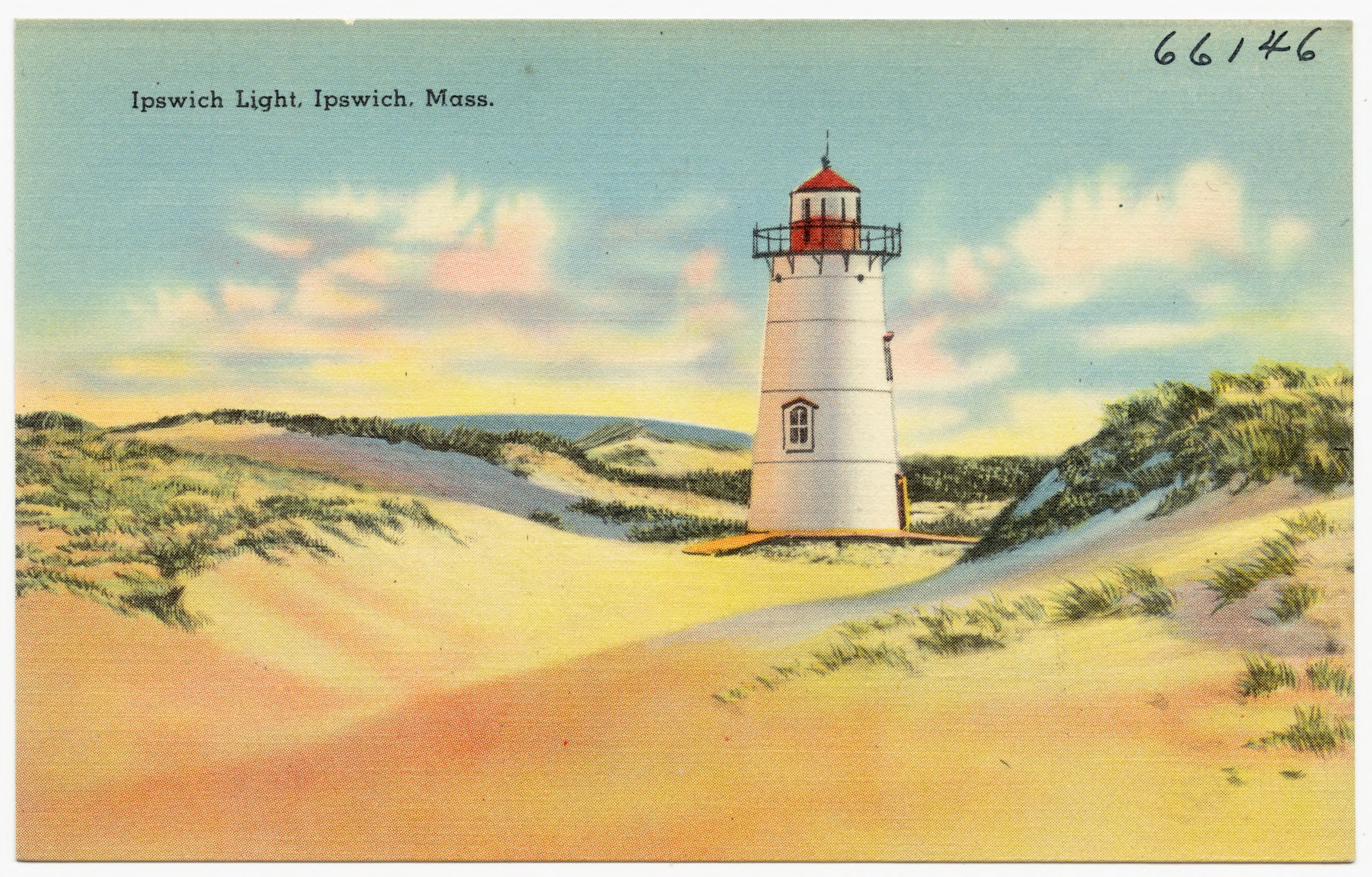
- Location: Ipswich, United States
- Coordinates: 42°41′07″N 70°45′58″W

Tower
- Constructed: 1838
- Ipswich Range Rear Light
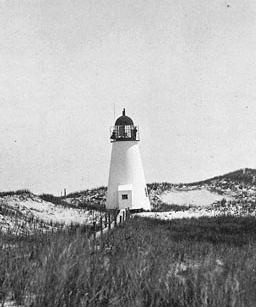
- 1838 rear tower
- Coordinates: 42°41′6.9″N 70°45′58.2″W
- Constructed: 1838
- Construction: Original, Brick; 1881, cast iron 1939, steel
- Height: 6 m (20 ft)
- Shape: Conical/conical/skeleton
- Markings: White/white/Daymark NR
- First lit: 1939 (current skeleton tower)
- Focal height: 30 feet (9.1 m)
- Range: 5 nmi (9.3 km; 5.8 mi)
- Characteristic: Original, fixed Soon thereafter, revolving Current, occulting white, 4 seconds
- Ipswich Range Front Light
- Constructed: 1838
- Construction: Original, Brick; Later, wood
- Height: 29 ft (8.8 m)
- Shape: Original, conical Later, shanty
- Markings: White
- Deactivated: 1932

The Ipswich Range Lights are a pair of range lights on Crane Beach in Ipswich, Massachusetts. They have a long and varied history. They were first built as two brick towers, 542 feet (165 m) apart on a more or less east–west line in 1838. The movement of the sands led to shifting of the towers and by 1881 the rear tower, Ipswich Rear Range Light, was badly cracked. It was replaced by a cast-iron tower, while by 1867 the front light, Ipswich Front Range Light, had been replaced by a movable wood structure that could be shifted as the channel shifted. The front light was discontinued in 1932 and the rear light was replaced in 1938 with a skeleton tower. It, or its replacement, is still in service today. The 1881 cast-iron rear tower was loaded on a barge and shipped to Edgartown, Massachusetts, where it replaced the Edgartown Harbor Light that had been destroyed in the Hurricane of 1938.

The modern light tower, located on the site of the Ipswich Range Rear Light as described above, is shown on Coast Guard lists and NOAA charts as Ipswich Light. It displays a white light which occults once every 4 seconds.

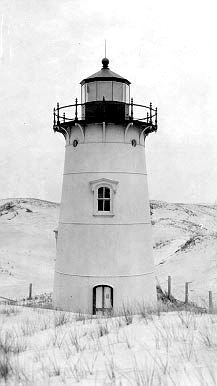
The 1881 rear tower.
