= Newburyport Harbor Light =

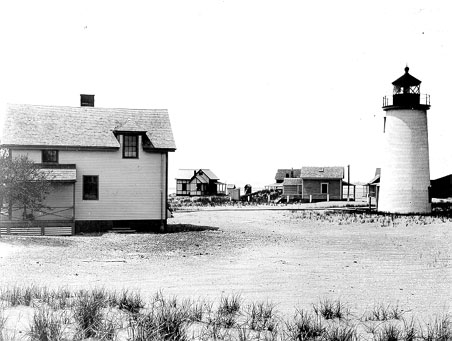
- The current tower, built in 1898. U.S. Coast Guard photo
- Location: Northern Blvd., Newburyport, Massachusetts
- Coordinates: 42°48′54.83″N 70°49′8.18″W

Tower
- Constructed: 1788
- Foundation: Concrete (originally wood)
- Construction: Wood
- Automated: 1951
- Height: 13.5 m (44 ft)
- Shape: Conical
- Markings: White with black lantern
- Heritage: National Register of Historic Places listed place
- Fog signal: none

Light
- First lit: 1898 (current structure)
- Focal height: 50 feet (15 m)
- Lens: 4th order Fresnel Lens
- Range: 10 nautical miles (19 km; 12 mi)
- Characteristic: Oc (2) G 15s
- Newburyport Harbor Light
- U.S. National Register of Historic Places
- Area: 0.3 acres (0.12 ha)
- MPS: Lighthouses of Massachusetts TR
- NRHP reference No.: 87001485
- Added to NRHP: June 15, 1987

The Newburyport Harbor Light, also known as Plum Island Light, built in 1788, is a historic lighthouse on Northern Boulevard in Newburyport, Massachusetts.

The original 4th order Fresnel lens is still in use, one of only five original glass Fresnel lenses still in use in Massachusetts.

The light is now owned by the City of Newburyport and is leased to the Friends of Plum Island Light.

It was added to the National Register of Historic Places as Newburyport Harbor Light on June 15, 1987, reference number 87001485.

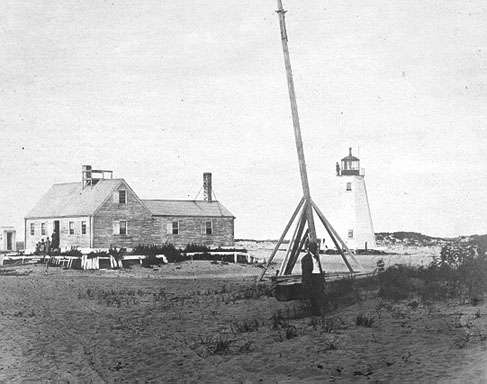
The original, 1793 tower.
U.S. Coast Guard photo

== See also ==
- National Register of Historic Places listings in Essex County, Massachusetts
