= Palmer Island Light =

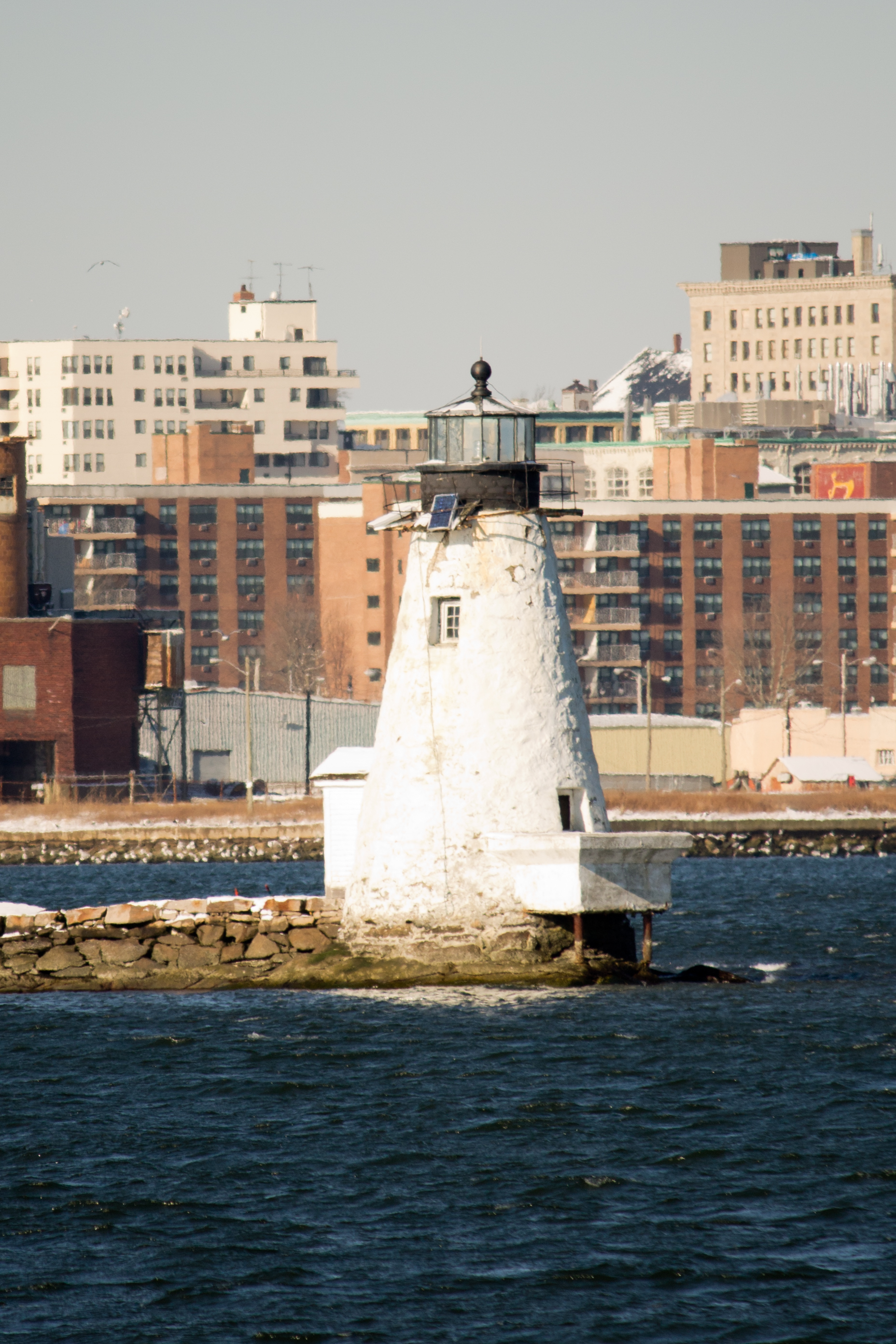
- Palmer Island Light, in 2013
- Location: New Bedford, Massachusetts
- Coordinates: 41°37′37″N 70°54′33″W

Tower
- Constructed: 1849
- Construction: stone
- Automated: 1941
- Height: 7 m (23 ft)
- Shape: Conical rubble tower
- Markings: White
- Heritage: National Register of Historic Places listed place
- Fog signal: Original: Bell; Current: none

Light
- First lit: 1999
- Deactivated: 1962, reactivated as a private aid (1999)
- Focal height: 13 m (43 ft)
- Lens: Fifth order Fresnel lens
- Characteristic: Fl W 8s
- Palmer Island Light Station
- U.S. National Register of Historic Places
- Architect: Charles M. Pierce
- MPS: Lighthouses of Massachusetts TR (AD)
- NRHP reference No.: 80000433
- Added to NRHP: March 26, 1980

Palmer Island Light Station is a historic lighthouse in New Bedford Harbor in New Bedford, Massachusetts, USA. The lighthouse was built in 1849 out of stone rubble. It was discontinued when the harbor's hurricane barrier was built in the early 1960s, as its location immediately north of the barrier was no longer an outlying danger and there are lights on either side of the barrier opening.

From 1888 until 1891 it served, with Fairhaven Bridge Light, as a range light to guide vessels past Butler Flats, a rocky shoal on the west side of the entrance channel.

It was added to the National Register of Historic Places as Palmer Island Light Station on March 26, 1980.

== Nomenclature ==
- The USCG historical web site calls it "Palmer Island Light"
- The current USCG Light List calls it "Palmers Island Light"
- The National Register of Historic Places calls it "Palmer Island Light Station"

== See also ==
- National Register of Historic Places listings in New Bedford, Massachusetts
