= Egg Rock Light (Massachusetts) =

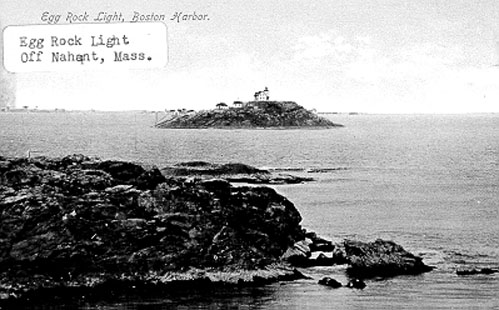
- US Coast Guard photo
- Location: Egg Rock, Nahant Bay, [Nahant] Massachusetts
- Coordinates: 42°26′0″N 70°53′53″W

Tower
- Constructed: 1856
- Automated: 1919
- Shape: Square Brick Tower with Attached Quarters
- Markings: White

Light
- First lit: 1898 (latest structure)
- Deactivated: 1922, destroyed 1927
- Lens: 5th order Fresnel lens
- Characteristic: F W. later F R

Egg Rock Light was first established in 1856 after a schooner went down with the loss of five lives. The original structure was a lantern on top of a stone dwelling built from granite cut on the island. After the wreck of the schooner Shark the characteristic was changed to fixed red because the captain of the Shark was said to have confused it with Long Island Head Light in Boston Harbor.

Following a fire in 1897 it was rebuilt with a square tower attached to the house. The light was operated at reduced intensity during World War I because of concerns over German submarines. It was automated in 1919 when a gas beacon replaced the oil light.

The structure was sold for $160 with a clause requiring the purchaser to remove it from the island. While moving the house down to the water, a cable snapped and the house slid into the water. The tower was destroyed in 1927. The island is now a bird sanctuary.
