= Bishop and Clerks Light =

Lighthouse in Massachusetts, United States

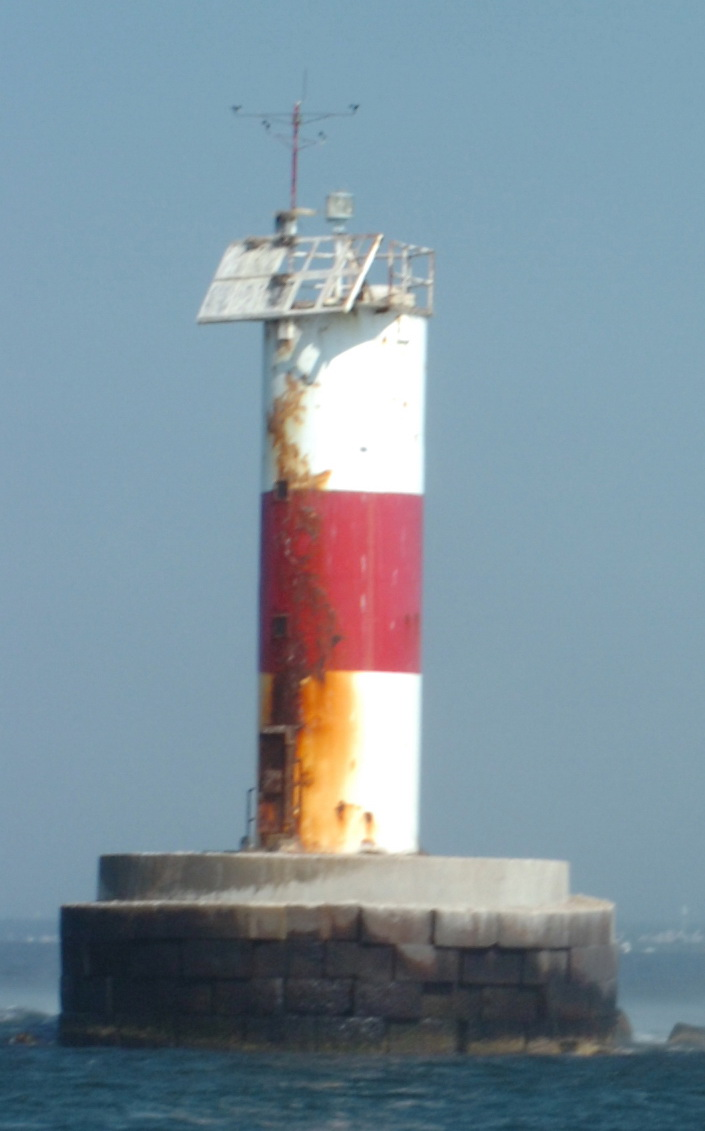
- Bishop and Clerks Light, 2005
- Location: Hyannis, Massachusetts
- Coordinates: 41°34′27.32″N 70°15′0.2″W

Tower
- Constructed: 1858 (original), 1998
- Foundation: Granite
- Construction: Granite (original); Fiberglass
- Automated: 1923 (original)
- Height: 59.5 feet (18.1 m) from base to center of lantern (original); 30 feet (9.1 m)
- Shape: Cylindrical
- Markings: Gray granite tower, black lantern, lead colored fog bell tower on west side (original); White with red band
- Fog signal: Bell every 15 seconds (original)

Light
- First lit: 1998
- Deactivated: 1928, destroyed 1952 by USCG (original)
- Focal height: 45 feet (14 m)
- Lens: 4th order Fresnel lens (original)
- Range: 14 nautical miles (26 km; 16 mi)
- Characteristic: Fl W 30s with red sector(original); Fl W 6s (current)

Bishop and Clerks Light is a lighthouse located in open water on Bishop and Clerks Rocks, about two nautical miles south of Point Gammon in Hyannis, Massachusetts, United States.

The light was established in a granite tower in 1858. It was automated in 1923, deactivated five years later and demolished in 1952. It was replaced with a white 30-foot pyramidal day beacon. The day beacon was replaced with a round, orange and white 30-foot tower placed on top of the original Bishop & Clerk's granite base in 1998.
