= Marblehead Light (Massachusetts) =

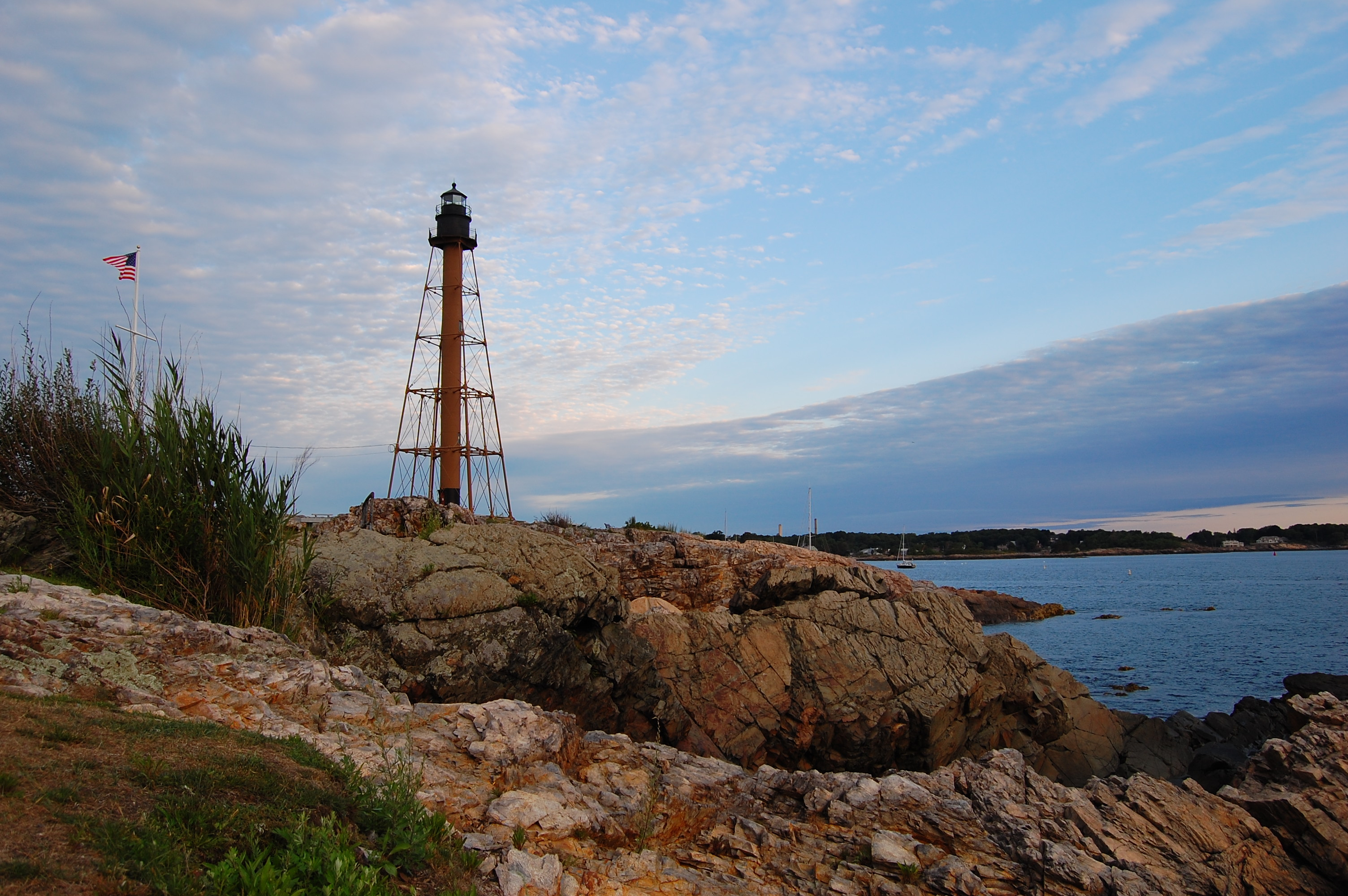
- Marblehead Light
- Location: Marblehead Neck, Massachusetts
- Coordinates: 42°30′19.6″N 70°50′1.2″W

Tower
- Constructed: 1835 replaced 1895
- Foundation: Concrete
- Construction: Cast Iron (current)
- Automated: 1960
- Height: 105 feet (32 m)
- Shape: Square skeletal
- Markings: Brown with black gallery and lantern
- Heritage: National Register of Historic Places listed place

Light
- First lit: 1835 (original light)
- Focal height: 130 feet (40 m)
- Lens: Sixth-Order Fresnel lens (original), 300 millimetres (12 in) (current)
- Range: 7 nautical miles (13 km; 8.1 mi)
- Characteristic: Fixed green
- Marblehead Light
- U.S. National Register of Historic Places
- Location: Marblehead Neck, Marblehead, Massachusetts
- Area: less than one acre
- Built: 1835
- MPS: Lighthouses of Massachusetts TR
- NRHP reference No.: 87001479
- Added to NRHP: June 15, 1987

Marblehead Light is situated on Marblehead Neck in Essex County, Massachusetts. The current tower is a skeletal structure that replaced the original 1835 brick and wood tower in 1895. It is the only tower of its type in New England; the next similar tower is to be found at Coney Island, New York. It was listed in the National Register of Historic Places, on June 15, 1987 as number #87001479 under Lighthouses of Massachusetts Thematic Group.

The United States Coast Guard Light List description is "Square skeleton tower; brown to gallery; black above". The actual light is 130 feet (40 m) above Mean High Water. Its fixed green light is visible for 7 nautical miles (13 km; 8.1 mi).

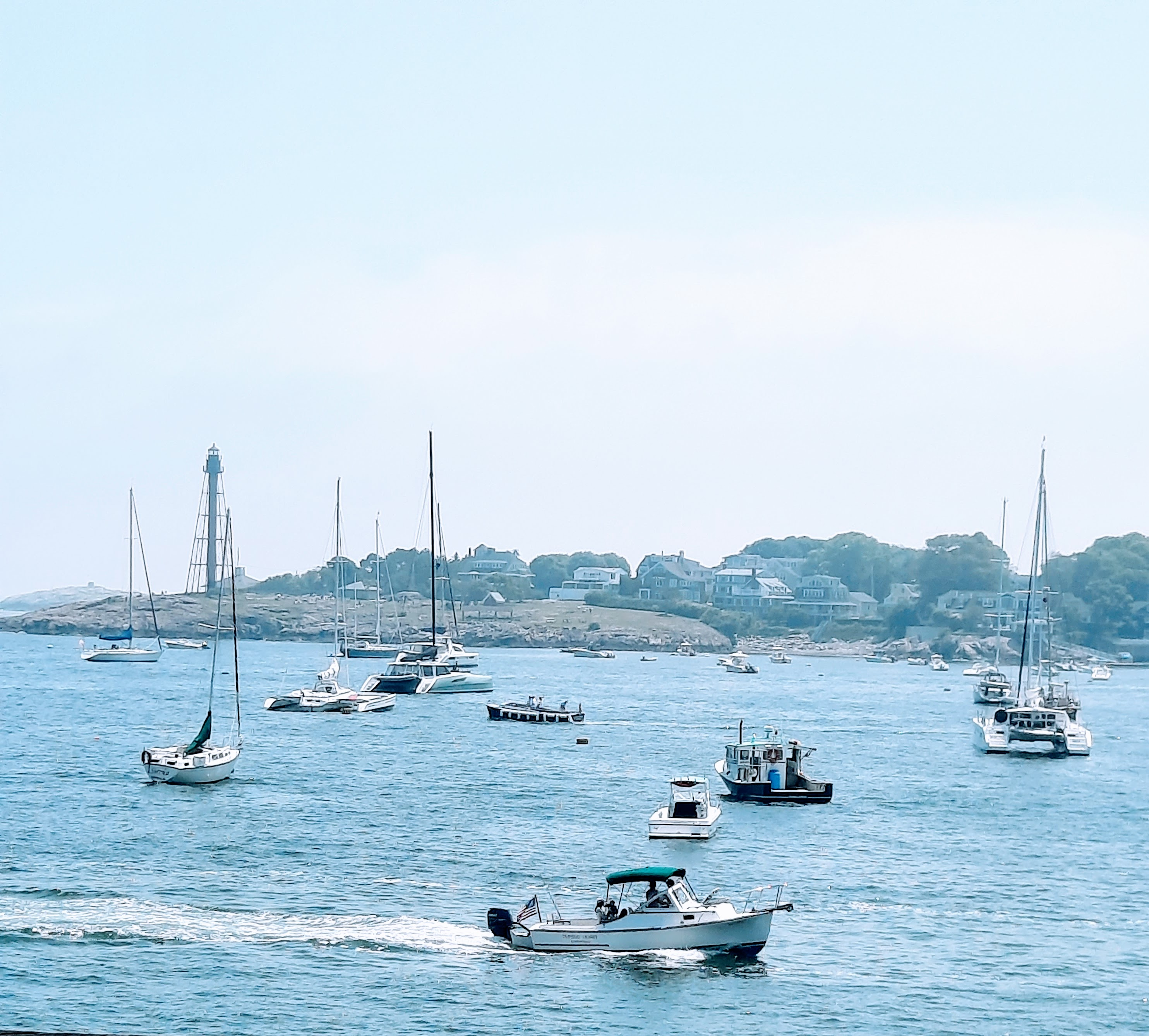
Marblehead Light 1-19-2024

== History ==
In August 1831, the townspeople of Marblehead requested that a lighthouse be built at the entrance to the harbor. Congress granted the wish and a 23-foot (7m) high tower was built in 1835 and commissioned on October 10, 1835. This tower had an array of ten whale oil burning lamps inside an octagonal lantern.

In 1857, the old lamp system was replaced by a sixth order Fresnel lens and reflectors. Despite the upgrade and work on the tower and associated keepers' house, the tower itself was in a poor condition and by 1893 a new light was requested. The new light was completed in 1895 at a cost of $8,786, the cost being much reduced by using a skeletal frame rather than rebuilding the old tower.

This new light consisted of eight cast iron piles on concrete foundations. The light was a sixth order Fresnel lens with a kerosene lamp. It was first illuminated on 17 April 1896 as a fixed white light. Later in 1922 it was changed to fixed red and then in 1938 to fixed green. In 1960, the light was automated and a new 300 millimetres (12 in) optic was installed.

About 30 feet (9.1 m) from the light are two bronze plaques located where the original light was, one listing the history of the light and the other listing keepers who looked after the light until it was taken over by the Coast Guard:

- 1835–1860 Ezekiel Darling
- 1860–1862 Jane C. Martin
- 1862–1872 John Goodwin
- 1872–1892 James S. Bailey
- 1892–1893 Albert M. Horte
- 1893–1928 Henry T. Drayton
- 1928–1930 Russell B. Eastman
- 1930–1938 Edwin C. Rogers
- 1938–1941 Harry S. Marden
- 1941–1947 – Light was controlled by the US Army
- 1947–1954 Joseph Barry

== See also ==
- National Register of Historic Places listings in Essex County, Massachusetts
