= Hyannis Harbor =

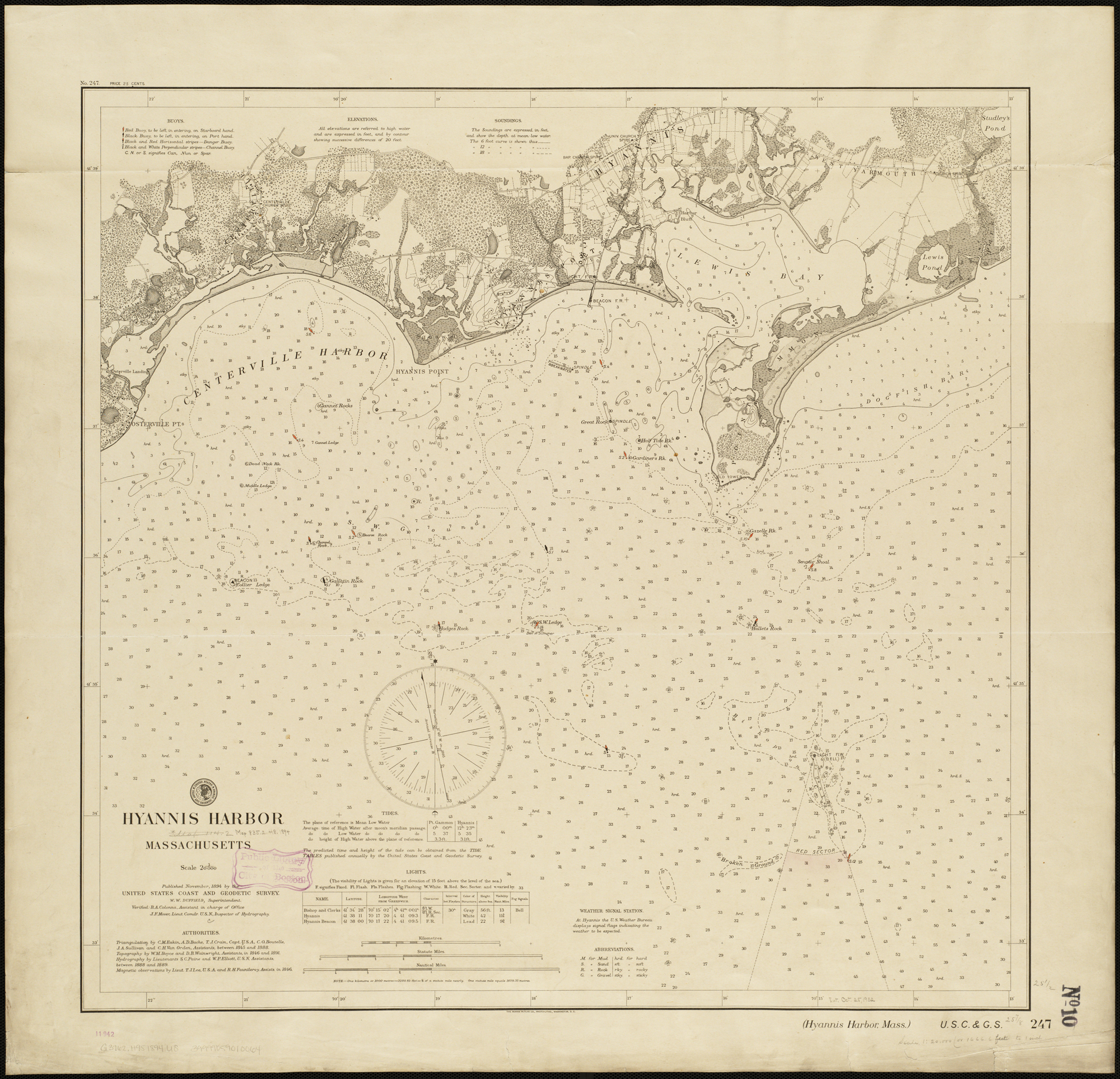
- Click on the map for a fullscreen view

Location
- Country: United States
- Location: Nantucket Sound, Barnstable, Massachusetts
- Coordinates: 41°37′53.3″N 70°17′12.7″W

Hyannis Harbor is a harbor of refuge located in the village of Hyannis Port, MA. The North East side of the harbor is located in the village of Hyannis. Hyannis Harbor extends on shore from the southerly point where the breakwall makes landfall to the small jetty at Dunbar Point on Kalmus Beach.

Hyannis Harbor is not a natural harbor but is protected by a breakwall that was constructed beginning in 1824. The harbor was used by packet schooners, often as a layover awaiting favorable winds to sail the treacherous back side of the cape to or from Boston. In the 1800s a large wharf, built to service the schooners, was expanded by a rail line linking to the main line in Hyannis. The wharf was dismantled and the granite was used to expand the breakwall. The harbor is now mainly used by private vessels and is home to the Hyannis Port Yacht Club.

Lewis Bay is a small natural harbor that serves as the principal harbor of Hyannis, MA. Lewis Bay is in the town of Hyannis and the town of Yarmouth, and contains the ferry docks in Hyannis in the town of Barnstable, Massachusetts. The inlet is called "Hyannis Inner Harbor" on some government charts. NOAA Nautical chart 13229 shows the relation between Lewis Bay and Hyannis Harbor.

== Gallery ==
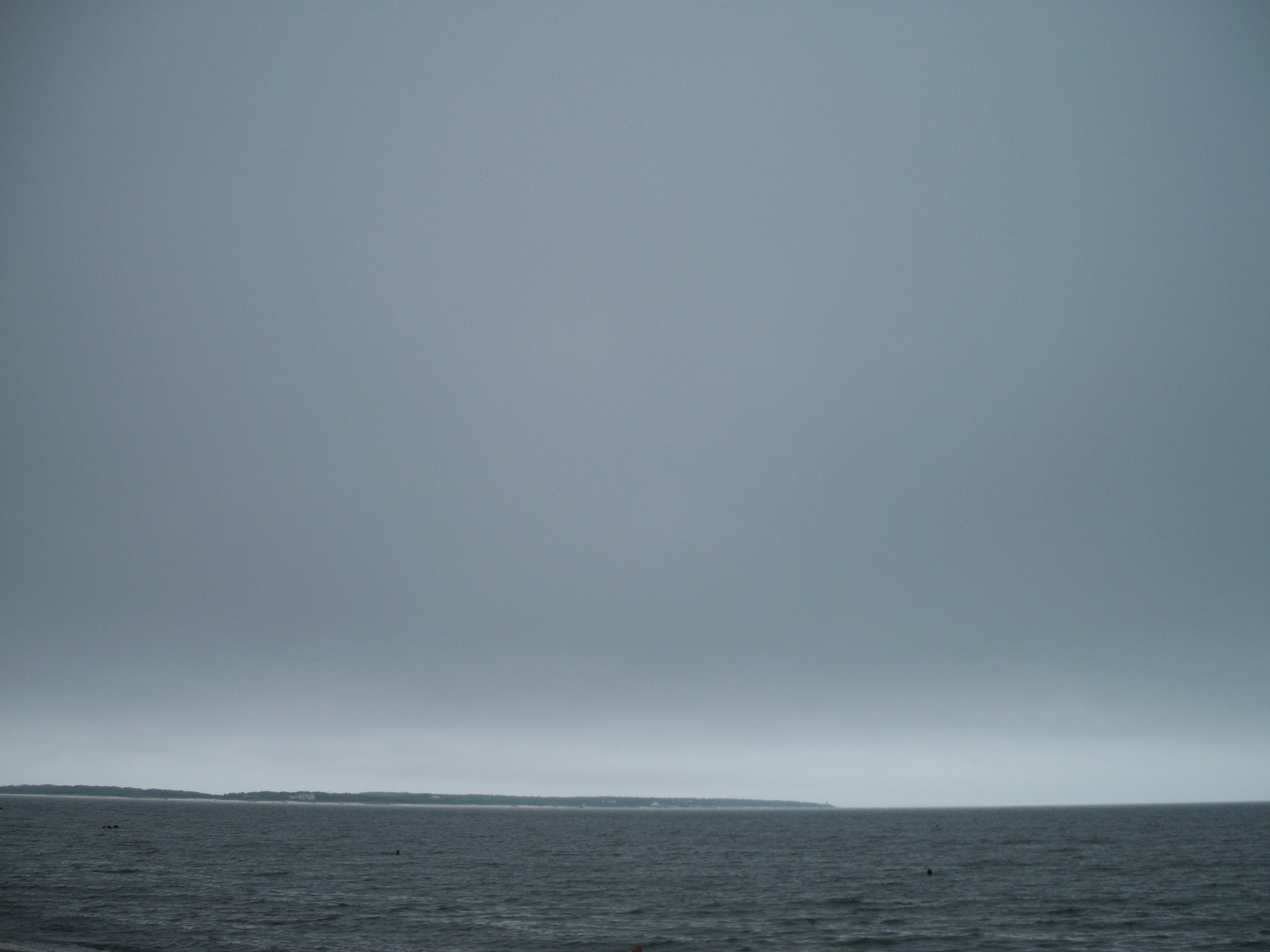
View to Point Gammon

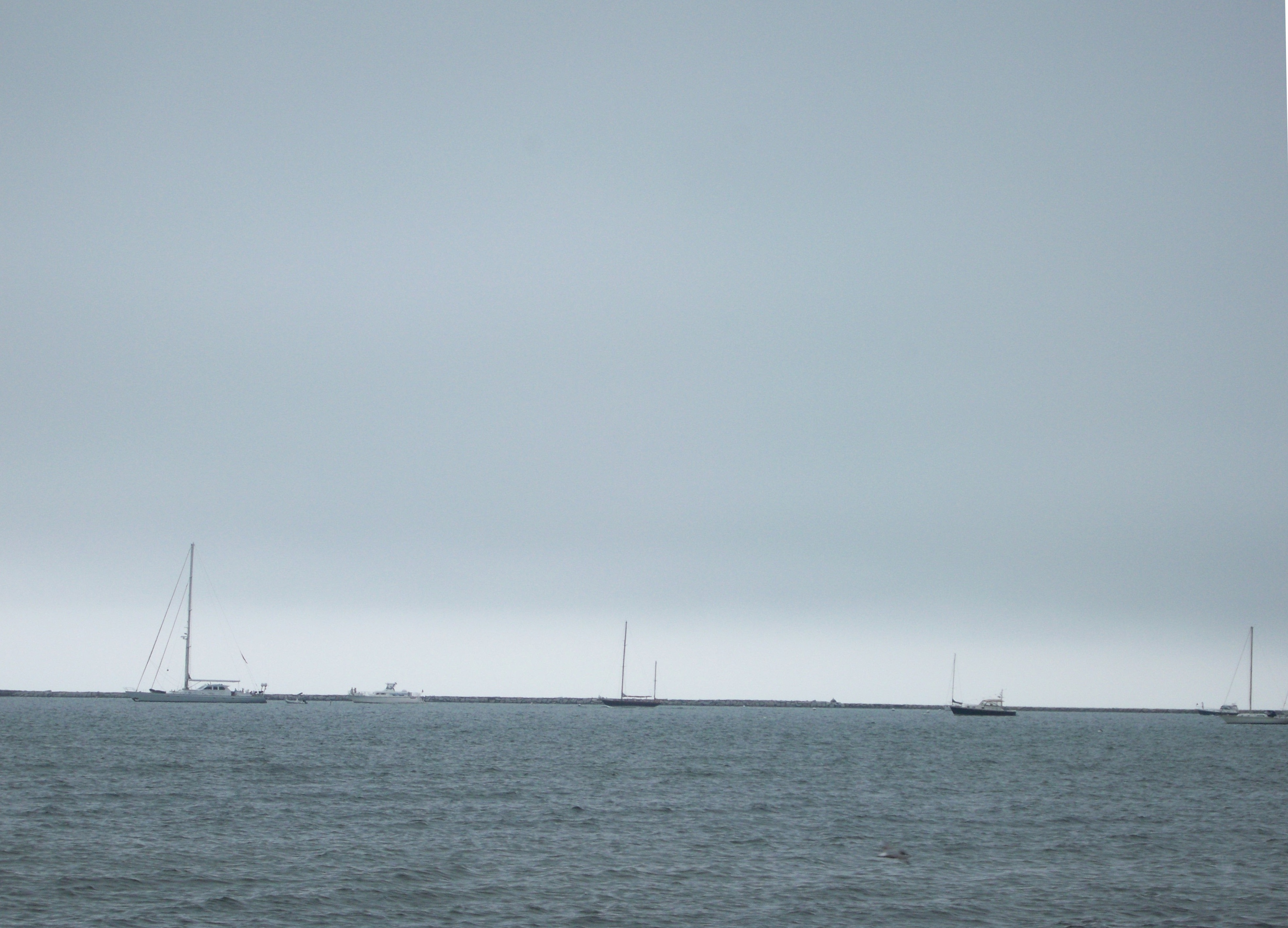
Hyannis Outer Harbor

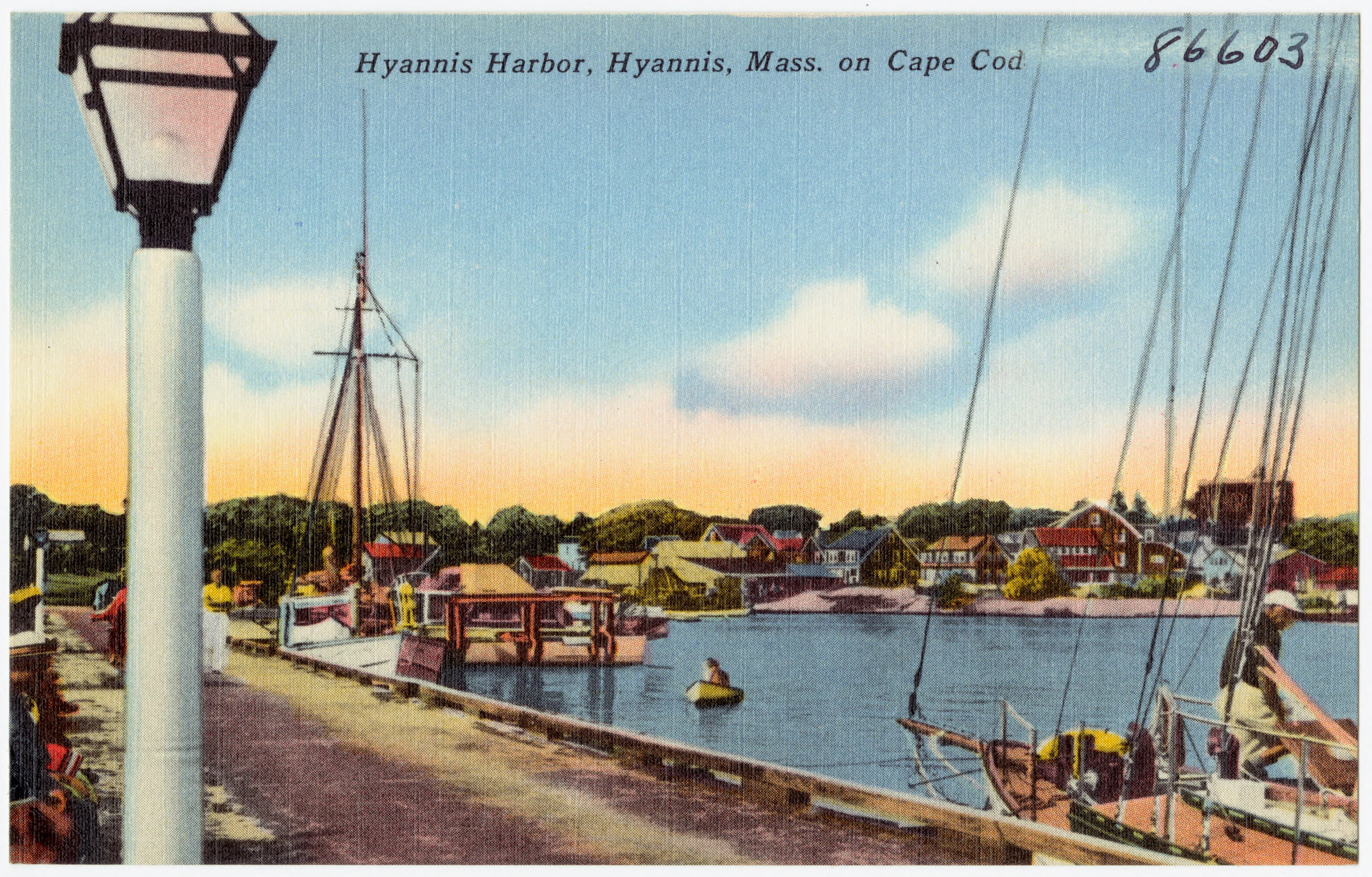
Hyannis Inner Harbor

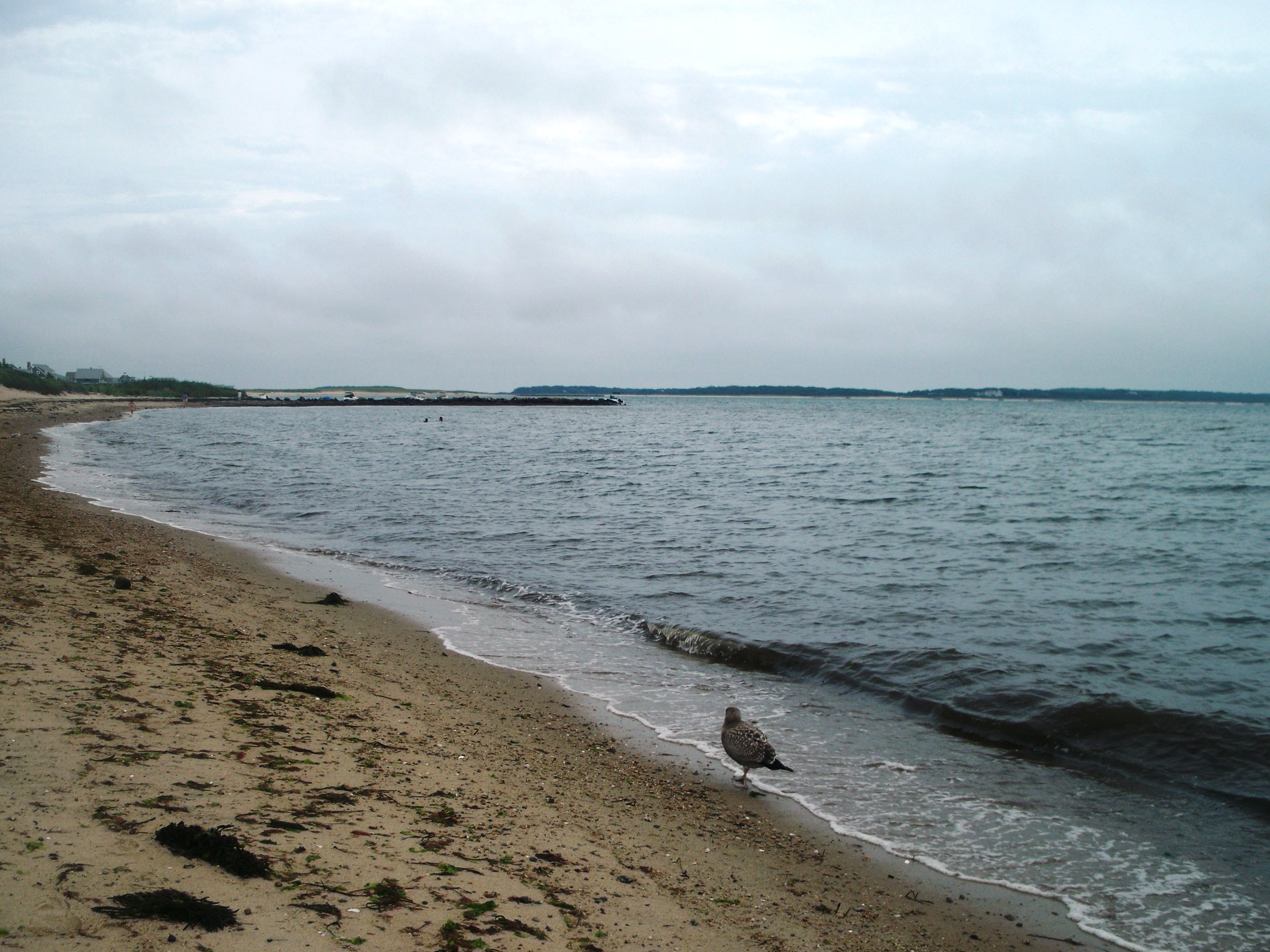
Hyannis outer Harbor coast
