= Butler Flats Light =

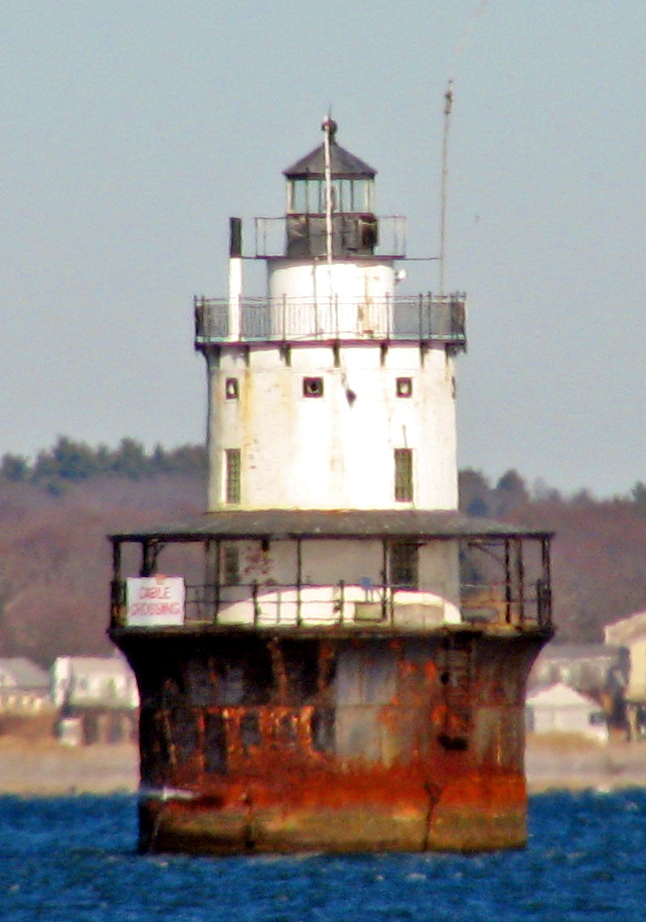
- Lighthouse in 2007
- Location: New Bedford Channel, Acushnet River, New Bedford, Massachusetts
- Coordinates: 41°36′13.5″N 70°53′40″W

Tower
- Constructed: 1898
- Foundation: Cast iron/Concrete Caisson
- Construction: Brick
- Automated: 1978
- Shape: Conical on cylindrical base
- Markings: White tower with black base and lantern
- Heritage: National Register of Historic Places listed place

Light
- First lit: 1898
- Deactivated: 2014
- Focal height: 53 feet (16 m)
- Lens: Fifth order Fresnel lens
- Characteristic: Flashing white 4s
- Butler Flats Light Station
- U.S. National Register of Historic Places
- Area: less than one acre
- Architect: F. Hopkinson Smith
- MPS: Lighthouses of Massachusetts TR
- NRHP reference No.: 87001530
- Added to NRHP: June 15, 1987

Butler Flats Light is a sparkplug lighthouse located in the outer harbor of New Bedford, Massachusetts, at the mouth of the Acushnet River. Built in 1898 by the United States Lighthouse Board, it is the only known caisson lighthouse designed by a marine architect. The light was added to the National Register of Historic Places as Butler Flats Light Station on June 15, 1987. Automated in 1978, it is now operated by the city as a private aid to navigation.

== Description and history ==
The Butler Flats Light is located outer reaches of New Bedford Harbor which is off the eastern shore of Clark's Point, the southernmost peninsula of the city. The light was placed to assist navigation into the inner harbor, located further north on the western bank of the Acushnet River. It is a caisson tank light with a total height of 53 feet (16 m), and is set on a concrete foundation set on the muddy bottom of the harbor. Atop the caisson is a circular brick structure, with a wide fog deck encircling it at the lowest level. The fog deck is slightly wider than the caisson, which is flared outward just below the deck to minimize the effects of wave action. An open deck circles the structure at the top of the brick section, where it transitions to the smaller iron lantern house, and a narrow third deck encircles the lantern chamber. The interior was historically divided into living and dining quarters (housing seven crew members), and office and storage space. Access to the structure is via a ladder that descends from the fog deck.

The light was built in 1898 to a design by F. Abraham Smith, and also included a fog signal. The light was rendered functionally obsolete after completion of the New Bedford Hurricane Barrier about 0.5 miles (0.80 km) further north, which included a small dike light. The light was fully automated by the United States Coast Guard in 1978, and the fog signal was moved to the barrier. After campaigning by local preservationists, the light was turned over to the city, which now operates it as a private aid to navigation. The lighthouse is not open to the public, but is easily visible from the shore along East Rodney French Boulevard in New Bedford as well as other points along the city's waterfront.

== See also ==
- National Register of Historic Places listings in New Bedford, Massachusetts
