= Cape Cod =

Peninsula in Massachusetts, United States

- Cape
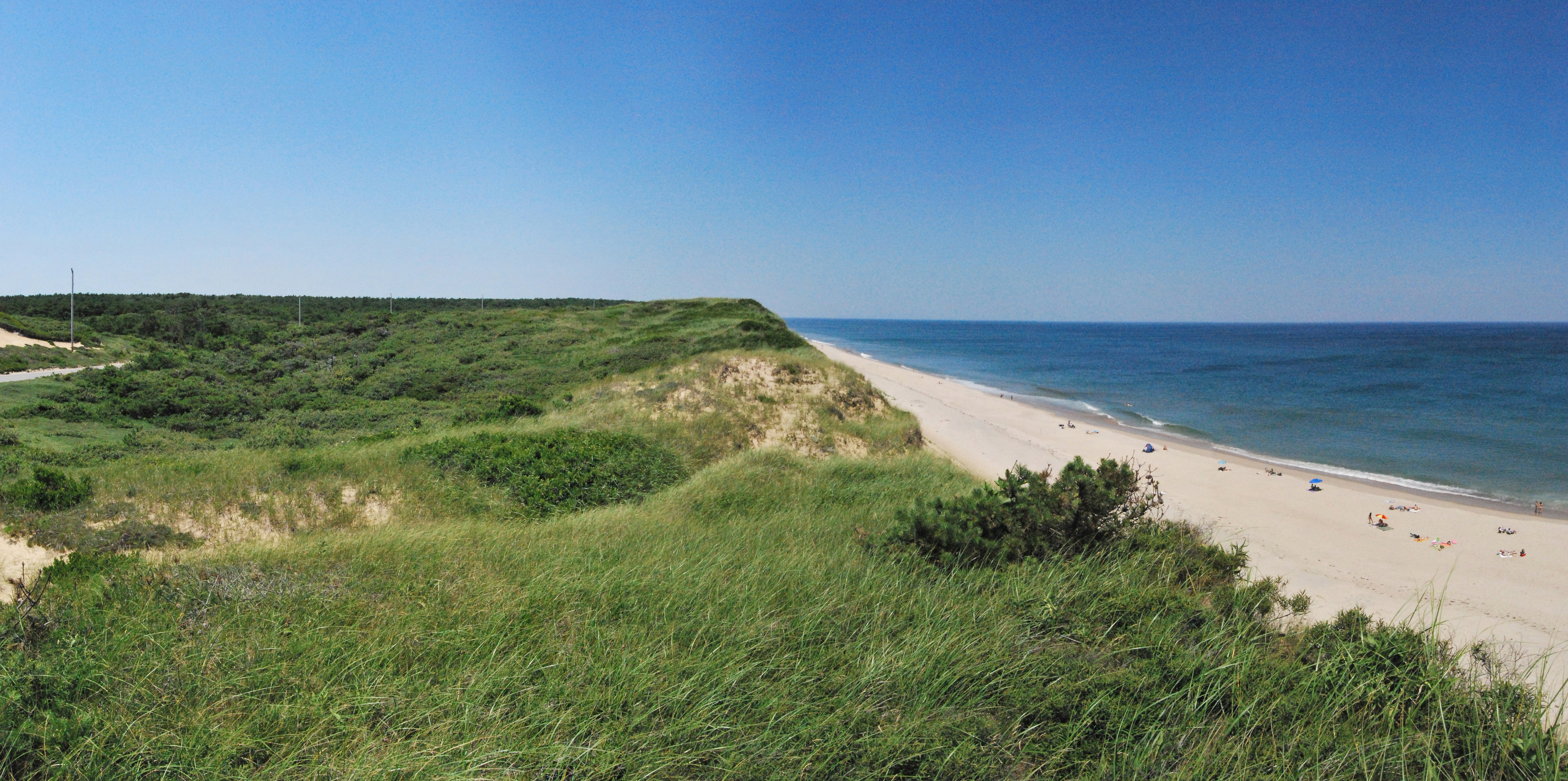
- The outer beach of Cape Cod National Seashore near Wellfleet

- Cape Cod (Barnstable County), in Massachusetts
- Coordinates: 41°41′N 70°12′W
- Location: Massachusetts, United States
- Water bodies: Cape Cod Bay; Buzzards Bay; Cape Cod Canal; Nantucket Sound

Area
  - Total: 339 sq mi (880 km^{2})
- Elevation: 306 ft (93 m)

Cape Cod is a peninsula extending into the Atlantic Ocean from the southeastern corner of Massachusetts, in the northeastern United States. Its historic, maritime character and ample beaches attract heavy tourism during the summer months. The name Cape Cod, coined in 1602 by Bartholomew Gosnold, is the ninth-oldest English place-name in the U.S.

As defined by the Cape Cod Commission's enabling legislation, Cape Cod is coextensive with Barnstable County, Massachusetts. It extends from Provincetown in the northeast to Woods Hole in the southwest, and is bordered by Plymouth to the northwest. The Cape is divided into fifteen towns, several of which are in turn made up of multiple named villages. Cape Cod forms the southern boundary of the Gulf of Maine, which extends north-eastward to Nova Scotia.

Since 1914, most of Cape Cod has been separated from the mainland by the Cape Cod Canal. The canal cuts 7 miles (11 km) roughly across the base of the peninsula, though small portions of the Cape Cod towns of Bourne and Sandwich lie on the mainland side of the canal. Two highway bridges cross the Cape Cod Canal: the Sagamore Bridge and the Bourne Bridge. In addition, the Cape Cod Canal Railroad Bridge carries railway freight and provides limited passenger service onto the Cape.

== Region of Cape Cod and the Islands ==
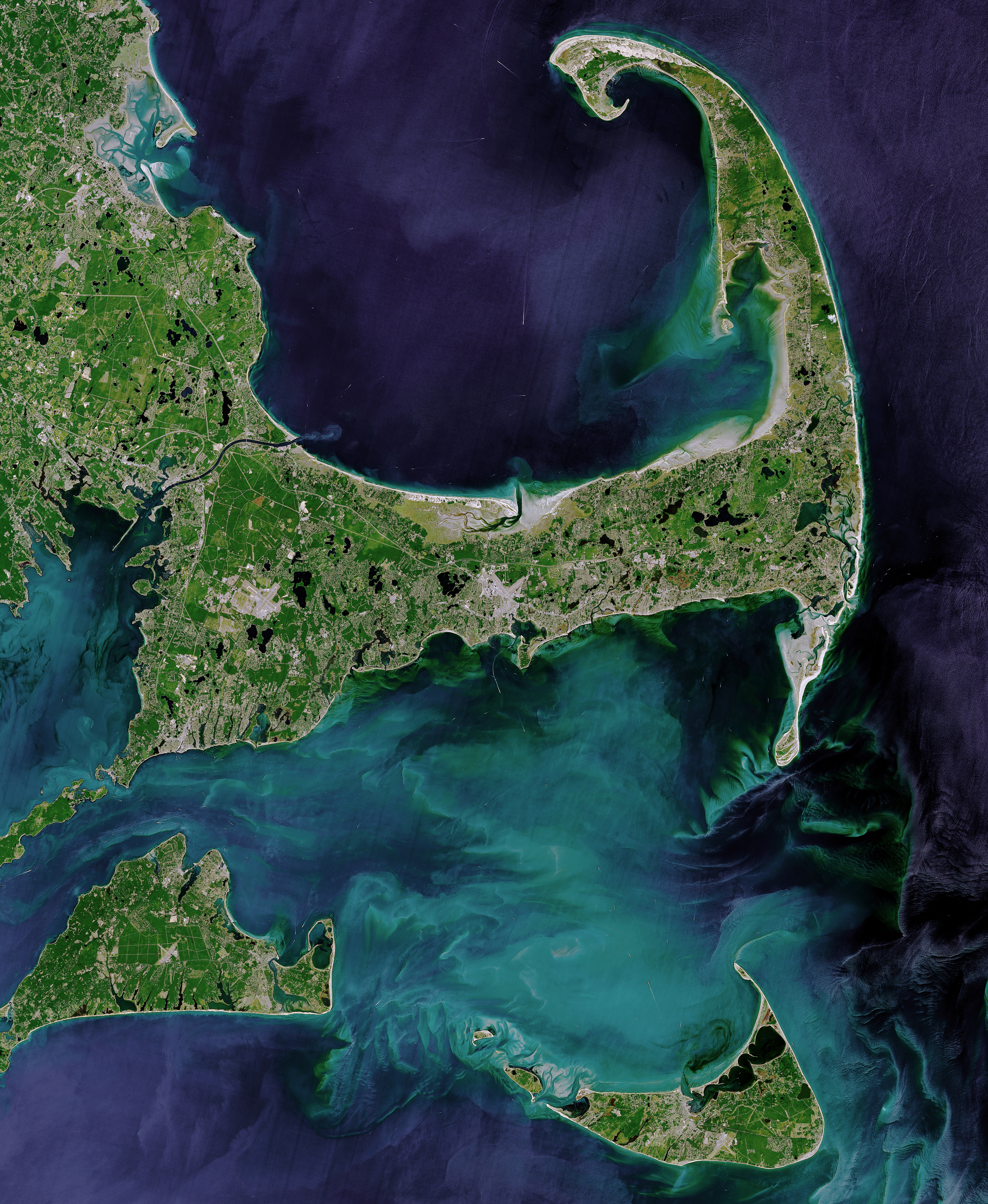
The Cape and Islands: Cape Cod (center to top-center), Martha's Vineyard (bottom left), and Nantucket (bottom right)

Like Cape Cod itself, the islands south of the Cape have evolved from whaling and trading areas to become resort destinations, attracting wealthy families, celebrities, and tourists. These include the large nearby islands of Nantucket and Martha's Vineyard. Both islands are also famous summer tourist destinations, commonly accessed by ferry from several locations on the Cape. The phrases Cape Cod and the Islands and the Cape and Islands are often used to describe the whole region of Barnstable County, Dukes County (including Martha's Vineyard and the smaller Elizabeth Islands), and Nantucket County.

Several small islands right off Cape Cod, including Monomoy Island, Monomoscoy Island, Popponesset Island, and Seconsett Island, are also in Barnstable County.

The Forbes family-owned Naushon Island was first purchased by John Murray Forbes. Naushon is one of the Elizabeth Islands, many of which are privately owned. One of the publicly accessible Elizabeths is the southernmost island in the chain, Cuttyhunk Island, with a year-round population of 52 people. Several prominent families have established compounds or estates on the larger islands, making these islands some of the wealthiest resorts in the Northeast, yet they retain much of the early merchant trading and whaling culture.

Cape Cod in particular is a popular retirement area; 31.8% of the population of Barnstable County is 65 years old or older., and the average age of residents is the highest of any area in New England. Cape Cod is majority Democrat, but by a smaller margin than the rest of Massachusetts.

The bulk of the land in the area is glacial terminal moraine and represents the southernmost extent of glacial coverage in southeast New England; similar glacial formations make up Long Island in New York and Block Island in Rhode Island.

== Geography and political divisions ==
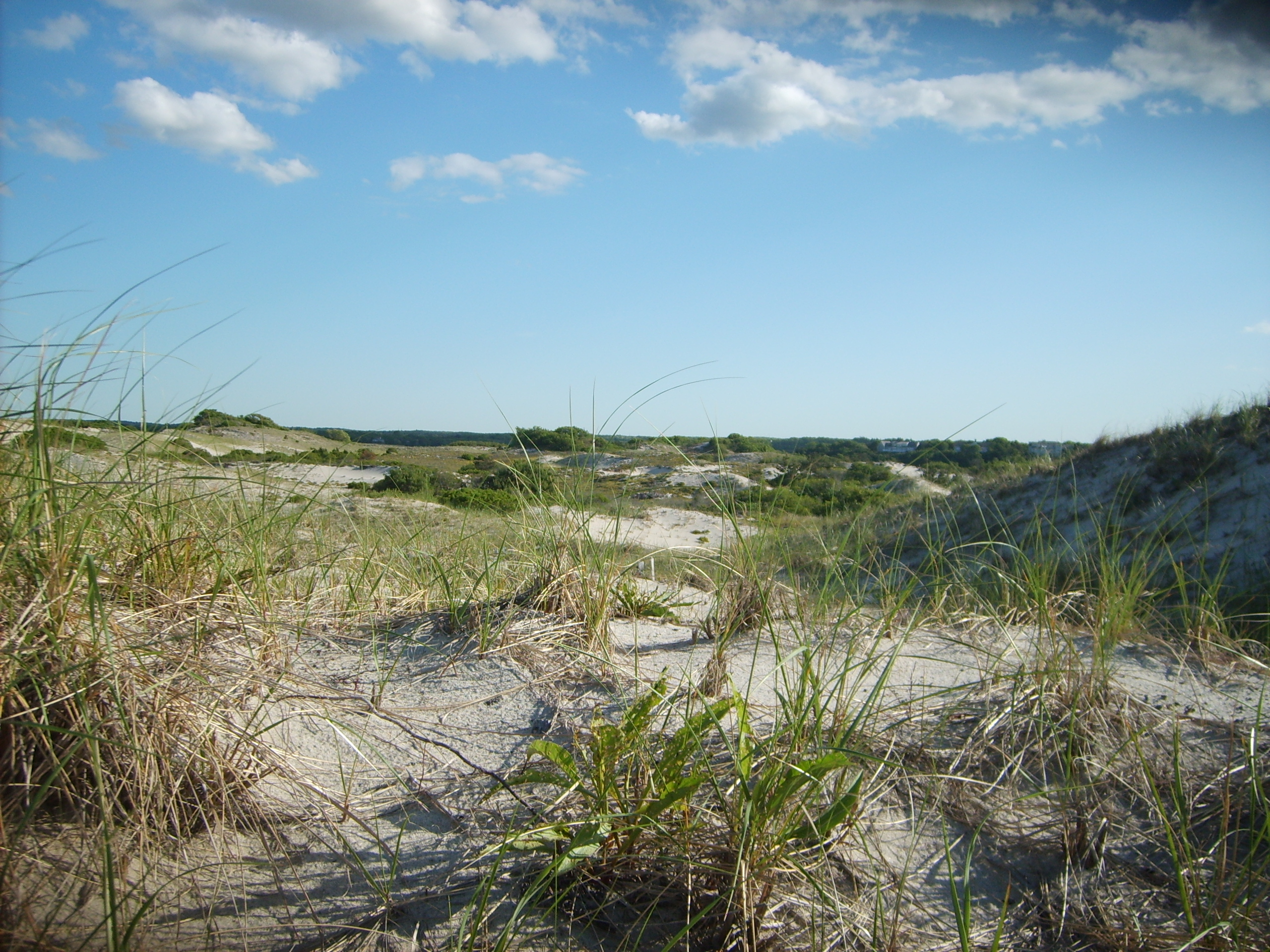
The dunes on Sandy Neck are part of the barrier beach that helps prevent coastal erosion.

=== Physical geography and boundaries ===
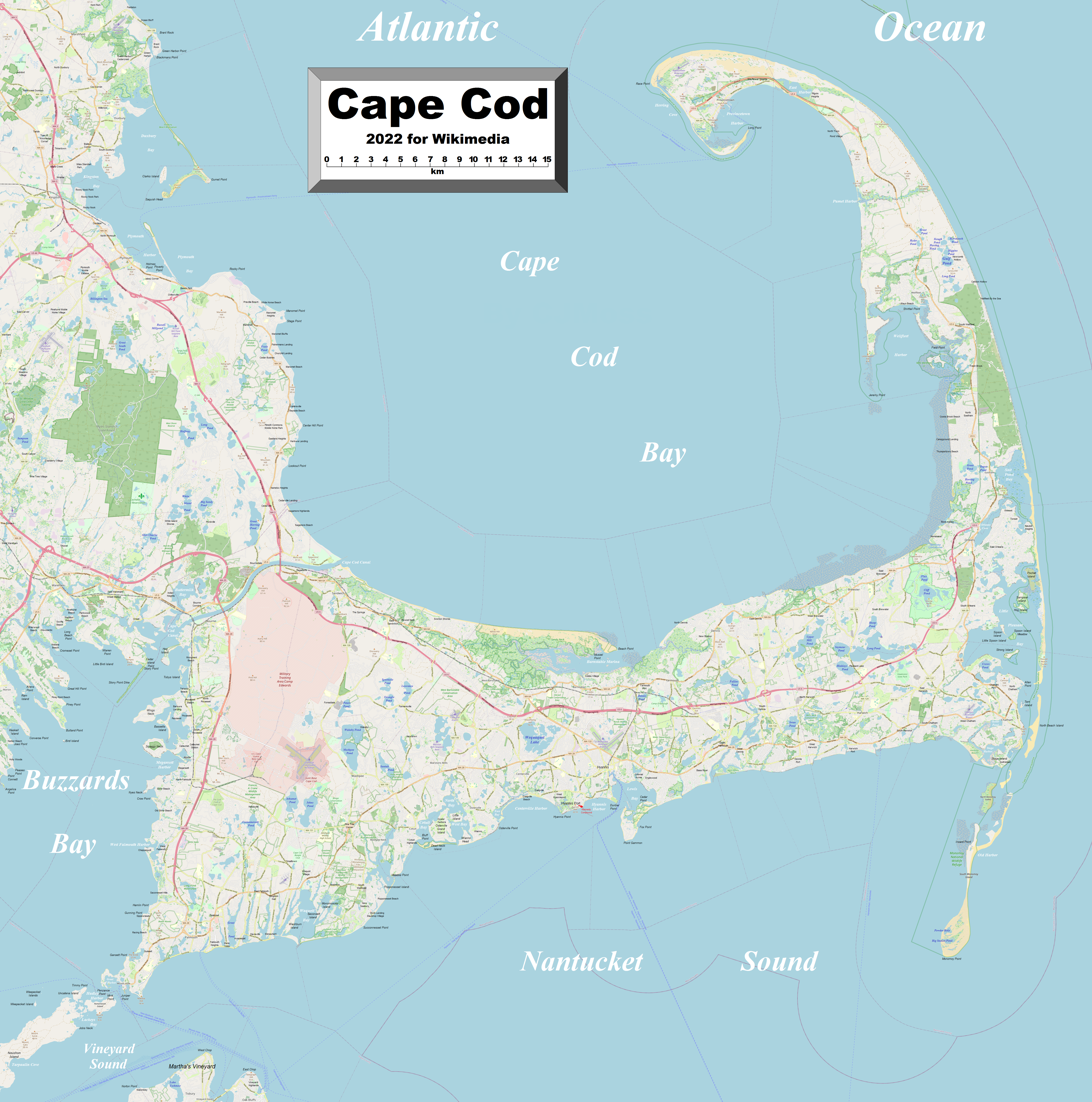
Detailed map of Cape Cod/Barnstable County

The name "Cape Cod", as it was first used in 1602, applied only to the very tip of the peninsula. It remained that way for 125 years until the "Precinct of Cape Cod" was incorporated as the Town of Provincetown. No longer in "official" use over the ensuing decades, the name came to mean all of the land east of the Manomet and Scusset rivers – essentially along the line that became the Cape Cod Canal. The creation of the canal separated the majority of the peninsula from the mainland. Many state and federal agencies, including the Cape Cod Commission and the Federal Emergency Management Agency (FEMA), treat the Cape as an island with regard to disaster preparedness, groundwater management, and other infrastructure factors. Cape Codders tend to refer to the land on the mainland side of the canal as "off-Cape", though the legal delineation of Cape Cod, coincident to the boundaries of Barnstable County, includes portions of the towns of Bourne and Sandwich that are located north of the canal.

Cape Cod Bay lies in between Cape Cod and the mainland – bounded on the north by a line between Provincetown and Marshfield. North of Cape Cod Bay (and Provincetown) is Massachusetts Bay, which contains the Stellwagen Bank National Marine Sanctuary, located 5 miles (8 km) north of Provincetown. Cape Cod Bay and Massachusetts Bay are both part of the Gulf of Maine, which includes the waters between the Cape and Nova Scotia. The Atlantic Ocean is to the east of Cape Cod, and to the southwest of the Cape is Buzzards Bay. The Cape Cod Canal, completed in 1916, connects Buzzards Bay to Cape Cod Bay; its creation shortened the trade route between New York and Boston by 62 miles (100 km).

Cape Cod extends 65 miles (105 km) into the Atlantic Ocean, with a breadth of between 1–20 miles (1.6–32.2 km), and covers more than 400 miles (640 km) of shoreline. Its elevation ranges from 306 feet (93 m) at its highest point, at the top of Pine Hill, in the Bourne portion of Joint Base Cape Cod, down to sea level.

Cape Cod and the Islands form part of a continuous archipelagic region consisting of a chain of islands running from Long Island to the tip of the Cape. This region is historically and collectively known by naturalists as the Outer Lands.

=== Towns and villages ===
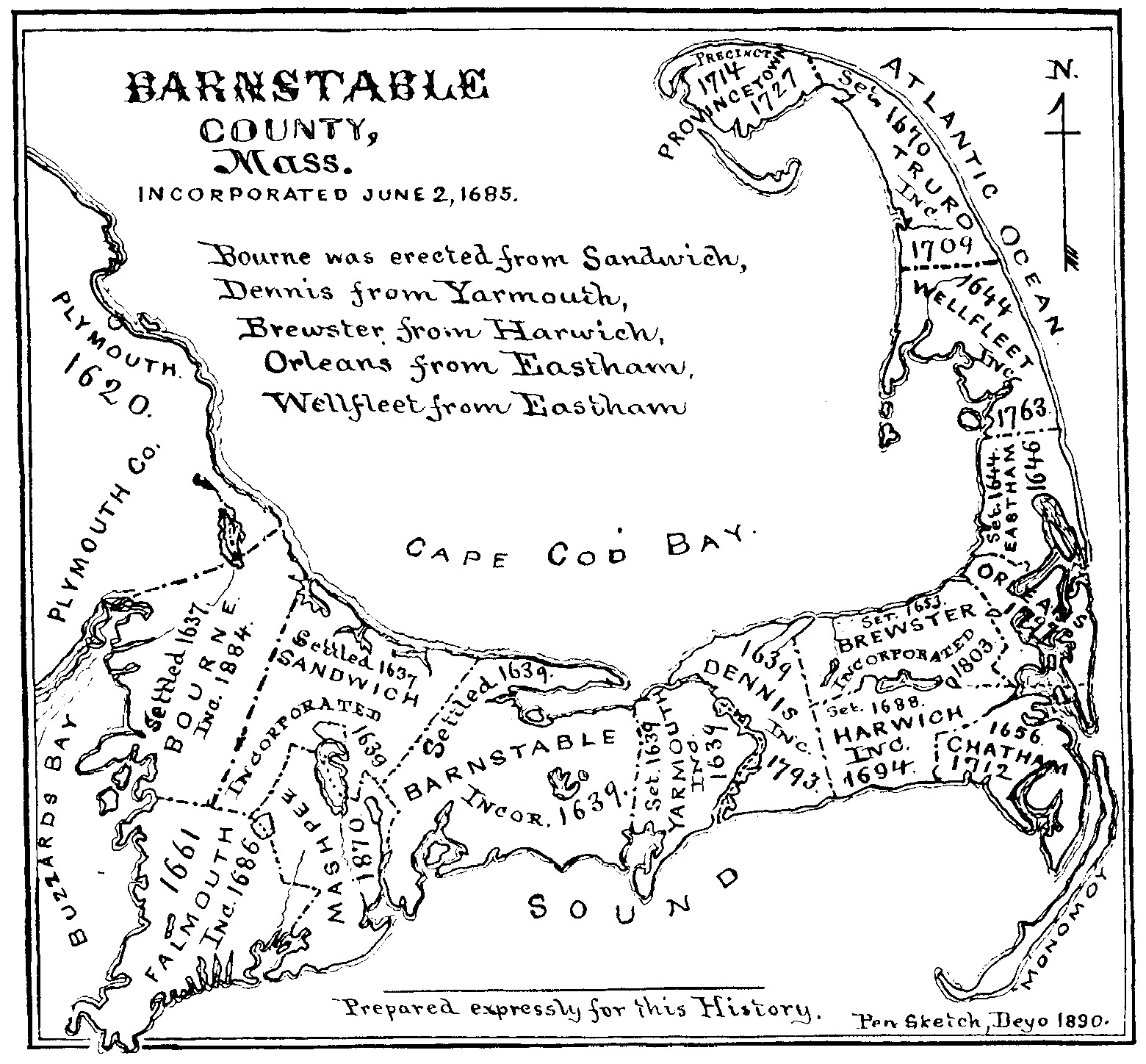
Barnstable County historical map, 1890

Cape Cod incorporates all of Barnstable County, which comprises 15 towns: Bourne, Sandwich, Falmouth, Mashpee, Barnstable, Yarmouth, Harwich, Dennis, Brewster, Chatham, Orleans, Eastham, Wellfleet, Truro, and Provincetown. Each of these towns includes a number of villages; see Barnstable County for a complete list.

Barnstable, the most populated municipality on Cape Cod, is the only one to have adopted a city form of government, whose legislative body is an elected 13-member council. However, like other smaller Massachusetts cities, Barnstable retained its "Town of Barnstable" moniker. All of the other towns elect a 5-member Board of Selectmen as the executive policy-setting board and utilize Town Meetings as their legislative body.

=== Cape Cod and the Islands ===
To the south of Cape Cod lie Nantucket Sound; Nantucket and Martha's Vineyard, both large islands; and the mostly privately owned Elizabeth Islands.

=== Sections ===
Upper Cape

1 / Bourne; 2 / Falmouth	3 / Sandwich; 4 / Mashpee

Mid-Cape

5 / Barnstable	6 / Yarmouth	7 / Dennis

Lower Cape

8 / Brewster; 9 / Harwich	10 / Chatham; 11 / Orleans

Outer Cape (occasionally, Lower Cape)

12 / Eastham; 13 / Wellfleet	14 / Truro; 15 / Provincetown

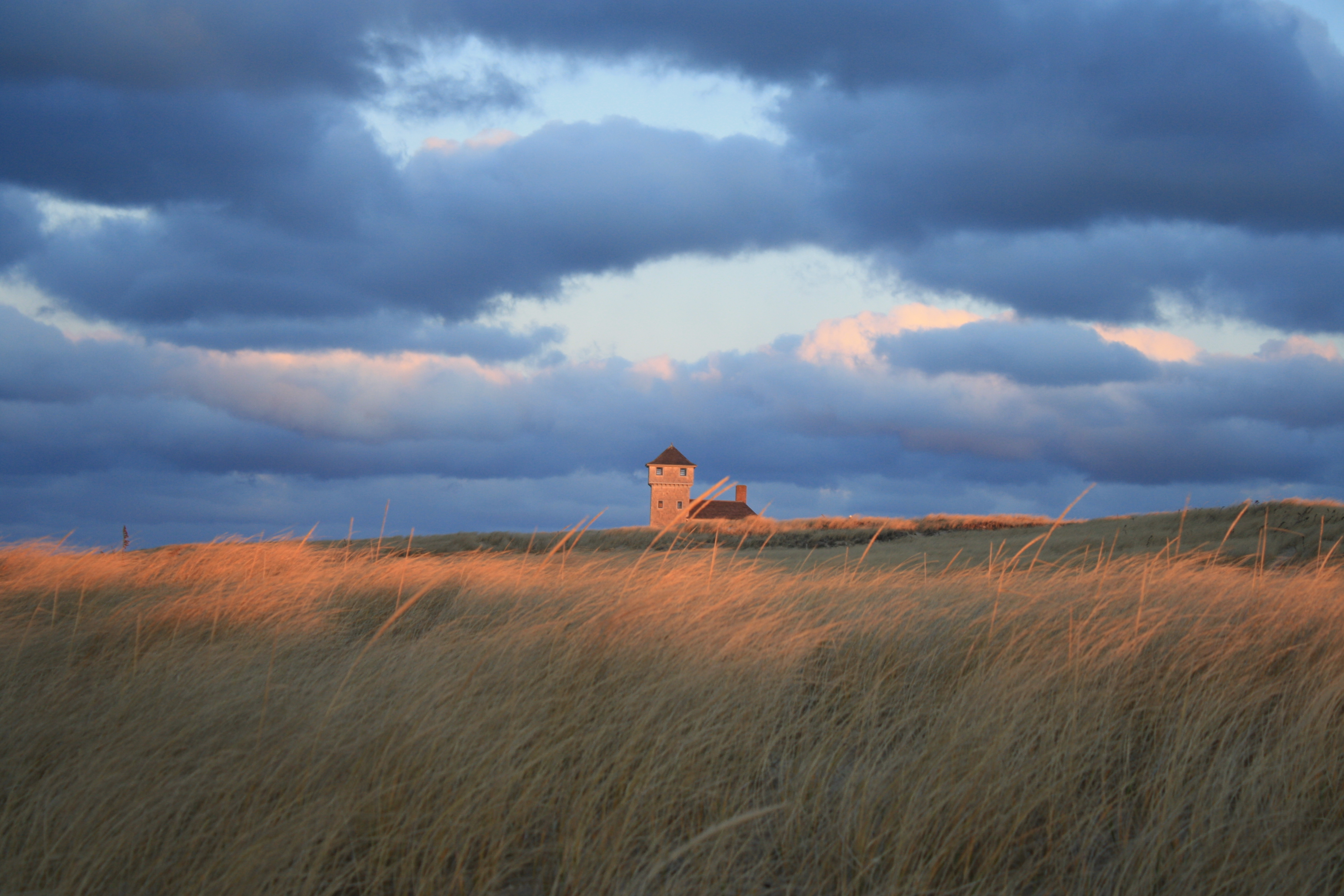
Old Harbor Life Saving Station, in the Cape Cod National Seashore

For most of the 18th, 19th, and 20th centuries, Cape Cod was considered to consist of three sections (see map):

- The Upper Cape is the part of Cape Cod closest to the mainland, comprising the towns of Bourne, Sandwich, Falmouth, and Mashpee. Falmouth is the home of the famous Woods Hole Oceanographic Institution and Marine Biological Laboratory as well as several other research organizations, and is also the most-used ferry connection to Martha's Vineyard. Falmouth is composed of several separate villages, including East Falmouth, Falmouth Village, Hatchville, North Falmouth, Teaticket, Waquoit, West Falmouth, and Woods Hole, as well as several smaller hamlets that are incorporated into their larger neighbors (e.g., Davisville, Hatchville, Falmouth Heights, Quissett, Sippewissett, and others). Bourne is home to the Massachusetts Maritime Academy, in the village of Buzzards Bay, along the canal, Joint Base Cape Cod, Aptucxet Trading Post, the annual Bourne Scallop Festival in September, and, until 1884, was part of Sandwich. Sandwich, the oldest town on Cape Cod, founded in 1637, is home to the Dexter Grist Mill, the historic Hoxie House, Heritage Museums and Gardens, and the Sandwich Glass Museum. Mashpee is the home of the Mashpee Wampanoag Tribe of Native Americans.
- The Mid-Cape area includes the towns of Barnstable, Yarmouth and Dennis. The area features many beaches, including warm-water beaches along Nantucket Sound, e.g., Kalmus Beach in Hyannis, which gets its name from one of the inventors of Technicolor, Herbert Kalmus. This popular windsurfing destination was bequeathed to the town of Barnstable by Dr. Kalmus on condition that it not be developed, possibly one of the first instances of open-space preservation in the US. The Mid-Cape is also the commercial and industrial center of the region. There are seven villages in Barnstable, including Barnstable Village, Centerville, Cotuit, Hyannis, Marstons Mills, Osterville, and West Barnstable, as well as several smaller hamlets that are incorporated into their larger neighbors (e.g., Craigville, Cummaquid, Hyannis Port, Santuit, Wianno, and others). The villages of Yarmouth are South Yarmouth, West Yarmouth and Yarmouth Port. There are five villages in Dennis, including North Dennis, East Dennis, West Dennis, Dennis Port, and South Dennis.
- The Lower Cape & Outer Cape traditionally includes all of the rest of the Cape, or the towns of Harwich, Brewster, Chatham, Orleans, Eastham, Wellfleet, Truro, and Provincetown. In the present day, the four outermost towns (Provincetown, Truro, Wellfleet, and Eastham) are more commonly and collectively known as the Outer Cape. This area is home to the Cape Cod National Seashore, a national park that encompasses much of the Lower Cape, including the entire east-facing coast from Orleans to Provincetown. The Lower Cape is home to popular beaches such as Nauset Light Beach and Coast Guard Beach in Eastham, Race Point Beach in Provincetown, Ballston Beach in Truro, and Skaket Beach in Orleans. This area is less populated than the rest of Cape Cod, though Provincetown can have a crowded, city-like atmosphere during the summer season. Provincetown has become a major gay & lesbian resort destination – the town is regarded as one of the largest LGBT resort communities in the United States. Provincetown is also renowned for its historic fishing fleets and Stellwagen Bank, a popular fishing ground and whale watching destination, is located a few miles north of Race Point.

== Geology ==
"East of America, there stands in the open Atlantic the last fragment of an ancient and vanished land. Worn by the breakers and the rains, and disintegrated by the wind, it still stands bold."

— Henry Beston, The Outermost House

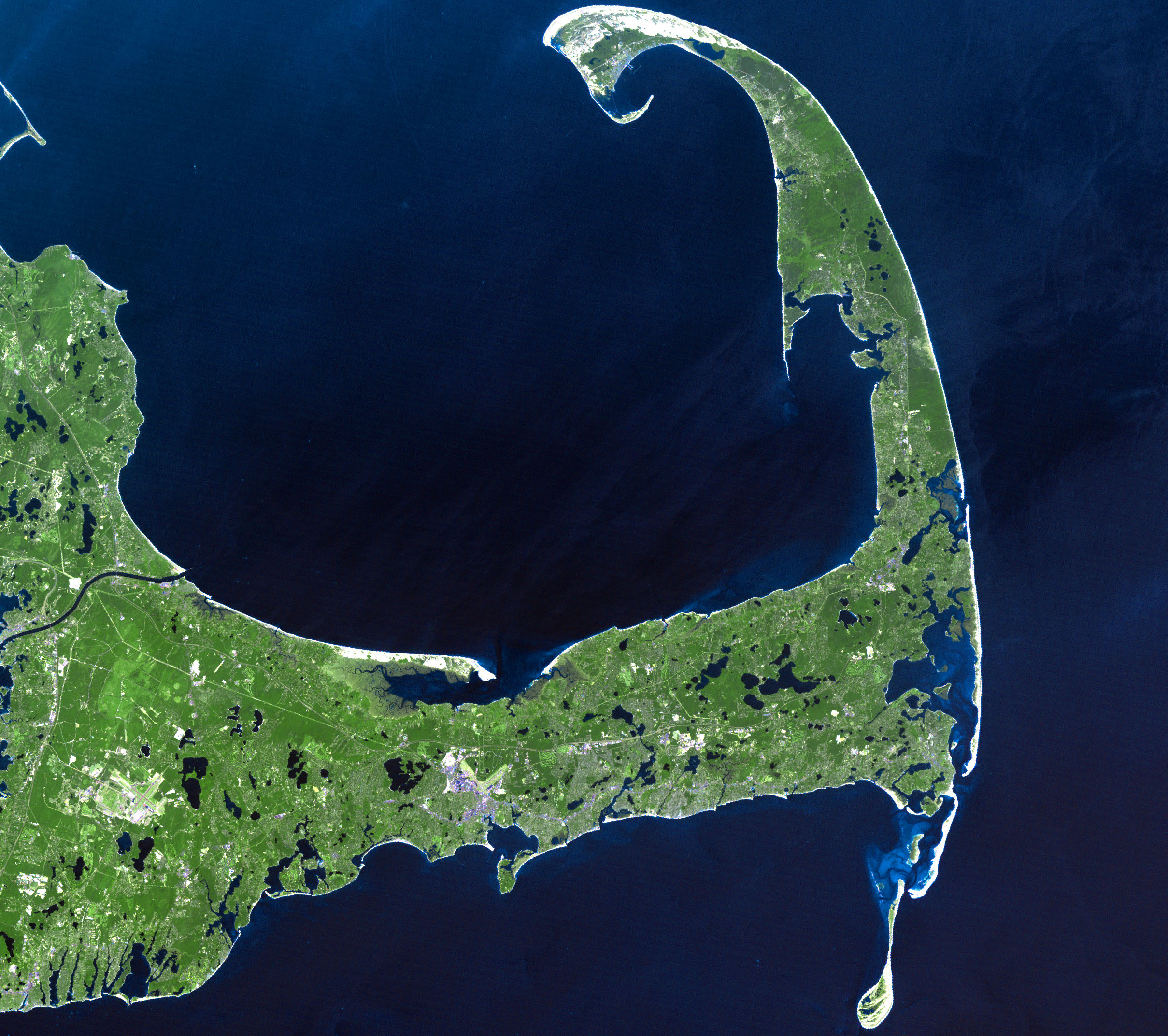
Cape Cod was formed by retreating glaciers

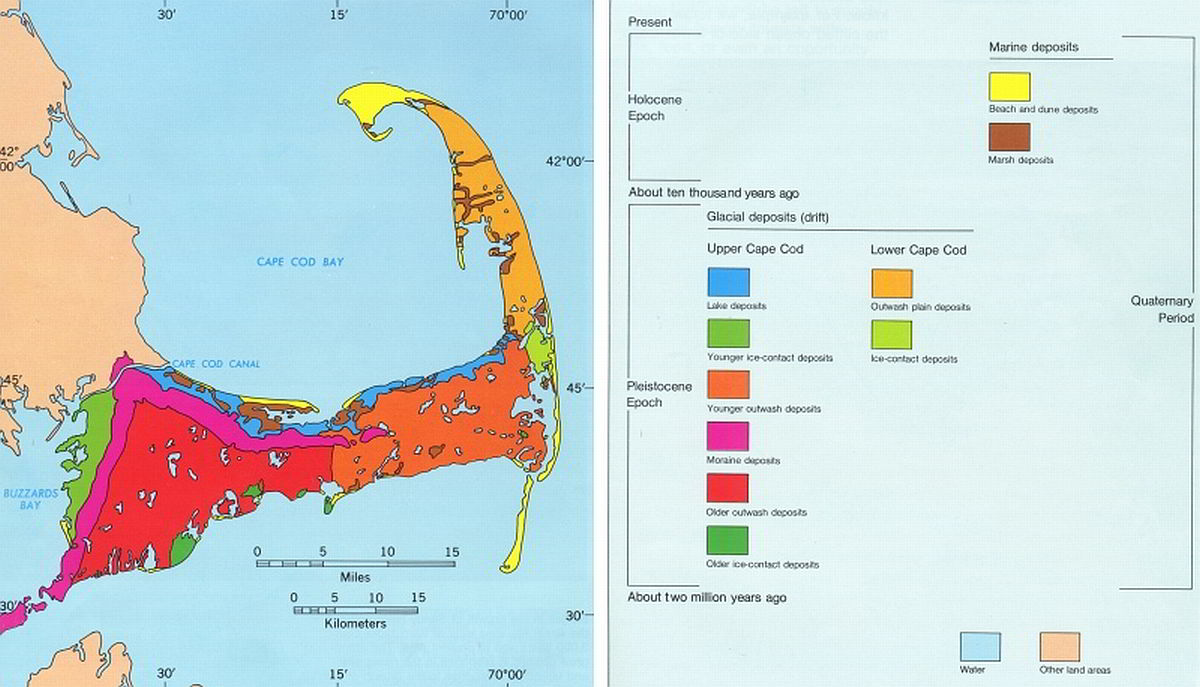
Geologic makeup of Cape Cod

The bulk of the land on Cape Cod consists of glacial landforms, formed by terminal moraine and outwash plains. This represents the southernmost extent of glacial coverage in southeast New England; similar glacial formations make up Long Island in New York and Block Island in Rhode Island. Together, these formations are known as the Outer Lands, or more obscurely as the "Isles of Stirling". Geologically speaking, Cape Cod is quite young, having been laid down some 16,000 to 20,000 years ago.

Most of Cape Cod's geological history involves the advance and retreat of the Laurentide Ice Sheet in the late Pleistocene geological era and the subsequent changes in sea level. Using radiocarbon dating techniques, researchers have determined that around 23,000 years ago, the ice sheet reached its maximum southward advance over North America, and then started to retreat. Many kettle ponds – clear, cold lakes – were formed and remain on Cape Cod as a result of the receding glacier. By about 18,000 years ago, the ice sheet had retreated past Cape Cod. By roughly 15,000 years ago, it had retreated past southern New England. With so much of Earth's water locked up in massive ice sheets, the sea level was lower. Truro's bayside beaches used to be a petrified forest before it became a beach.

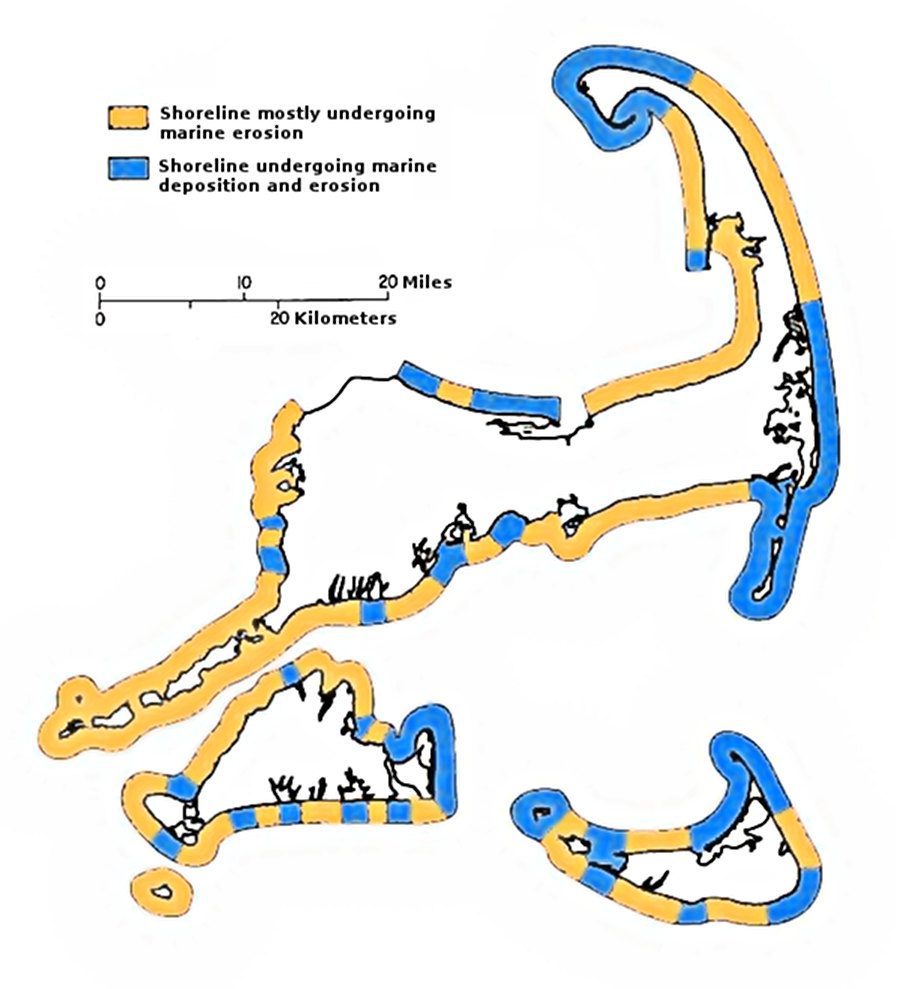
Coastal erosion by wave action (colored buff in this map) brings growth elsewhere by deposition of transported sediment (shown in blue).

As the ice began to melt, the sea began to rise. Initially, sea level rose quickly, about 15 metres (49 ft) per 1,000 years, but then the rate declined. On Cape Cod, sea level rose roughly 3 metres (9.8 ft) per millennium between 6,000 and 2,000 years ago. After that, it continued to rise at about 1 metre (3.3 ft) per millennium. By 6,000 years ago, the sea level was high enough to start eroding the glacial deposits that the vanished continental ice sheet had left on Cape Cod. The water transported the eroded deposits north and south along the outer Cape's shoreline through a process known as longshore drift. Those reworked sediments that moved north went to the tip of Cape Cod. The entire town of Provincetown, at the extreme tip of the Cape, is a spit consisting largely of deposited marine sediment that was eroded and transported from farther south along the shore. Those sediments that instead moved south created the islands and shoals of Monomoy. So while other parts of the Cape have dwindled from the action of the waves, these parts of the Cape have grown through the deposition of sediment in just the last 6,000 years.

This process continues today. Due to their exposure to the open ocean, the Cape and islands are subject to considerable coastal erosion. Due to erosion, the Cape will be completely submerged by the sea within several thousand years. This erosion causes the washout of beaches and the destruction of the barrier islands; for example, the ocean broke through the barrier island at Chatham during Hurricane Bob in 1991, allowing waves and storm surge to hit the coast with no obstruction. Consequently, the sediment and sand from the beaches are being washed away and deposited elsewhere. While this destroys land in some places, it creates land elsewhere, most noticeably in marshes where sediment is deposited by flowing water.

Cape Cod's aquifer consists of six hydrologically independent lenses from which all the towns on the Cape obtain drinking water (except Falmouth, which, in 2015, drew 43.5% of its water from Long Pond). Contamination with industrial chemicals and pharmaceutical drugs from septic systems is a concern. In 2023, the state began a nitrogen pollution regulation scheme for Cape Cod and the Islands to address overgrowth of algae, cyanobacteria, and plants.

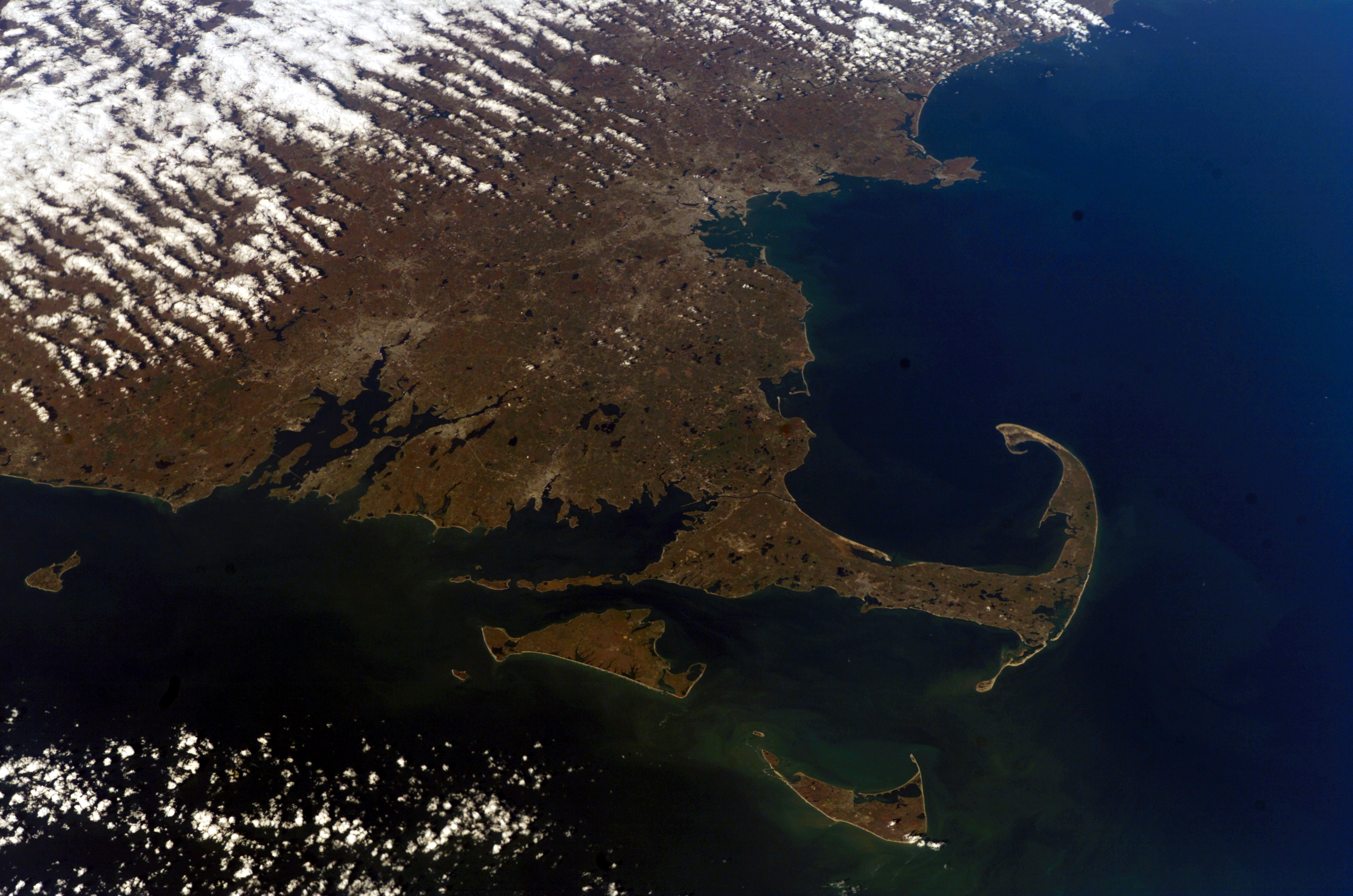
View of Cape Cod from the ISS

== Climate ==
Under the Köppen climate classification, the Cape Cod area has an oceanic climate. Locally, the Cape has a more moderate climate than inland locations in eastern New England. On occasion, it takes the brunt of extreme weather systems such as the Blizzard of 2005 and Hurricane Bob. Because of the influence of the Atlantic Ocean on three sides, temperatures are typically a few degrees lower in the summer and often several degrees higher in the winter than the adjacent mainland. Two ocean currents (the Gulf Stream, a warm ocean current from the south, and the Labrador Current, a cold ocean current from the north), meander and interact with each other. As a result, the ocean temperatures on the eastern shore of Cape Cod rarely get above 60 °F (16 °C), while along the southern coast (Nantucket Sound), water temperatures can sometimes reach 70 °F (21 °C) or higher.

The water surrounding Cape Cod moderates winter temperatures nearly enough to extend the humid subtropical climate zone to what could be its northernmost limit in eastern North America, as the peninsula is split between USDA hardiness zones 7a (Upper and Mid Cape) and 7b (Lower and Outer Cape). Consequently, many subtropical indicator plant species typically found in more southerly latitudes are grown there, including Camellias, Ilex opaca, Magnolia grandiflora and Albizia julibrissin. However, Cape Cod falls below the 72 °F (22 °C) threshold, as the warmest month, July, averages around 68.25 °F (20.14 °C).

Cape Cod's climate is also known for a delayed spring season due to the sea remaining cold from the winter; by the same token, the summer heat retained in the sea moderates fall temperatures in comparison to the adjacent inland area. The highest temperature yet recorded on the peninsula was 104 °F (40 °C) in Provincetown, the lowest temperature recorded was −12 °F (−24 °C) in Barnstable.

Precipitation on Cape Cod and the islands of Martha's Vineyard and Nantucket is the lowest in the southern New England region, averaging slightly less than 40 inches (100 cm) a year (most parts of New England average 42 to 46 inches (110 to 120 cm)). This is due to the maritime influence inhibiting summertime thunderstorm development and maintenance. The region does not experience a greater number of sunny days, however, as the number of cloudy days is the same as inland locales, in addition to increased fog. On average, roughly 27 inches (69 cm) of snow, which is about 17 inches (43 cm) less than Boston, falls in an average winter.

Once every five or six years, a tropical storm, accompanied by very high and potentially damaging winds and heavy rain, will strike the region. About once every 11 or 12 years a hurricane brings damaging winds and storm surges to the region. Several Category 3 storms have struck Cape Cod since record-keeping began, such as a hurricane in 1869, the 1938 New England hurricane, and Hurricane Carol in 1954. Strong Category 2 storms, such as the 1869 Saxby Gale, Hurricane Edna in 1954, and Hurricane Bob in 1991, also caused considerable damage. Notable Category 1 storms include the 1944 Great Atlantic hurricane and Hurricane Donna in 1960. Other notable storms include the Gale of 1815, which would likely have been rated a strong hurricane on the Saffir-Simpson scale, and the so-called "Perfect Storm" of October 31, 1991. The February 2013 nor'easter produced winds in excess of 80 miles per hour (130 km/h) and dropped over 24 inches (61 cm) of snow on some parts of Cape Cod. The storm knocked out power to tens of thousands of Cape Cod residents, some for up to two weeks.

Climate data for Cape Cod (Chatham, Massachusetts)
Month	Jan	Feb	Mar	Apr	May	Jun	Jul	Aug	Sep	Oct	Nov	Dec	Year
Record high °F (°C)	61 (16)	57 (14)	77 (25)	81 (27)	88 (31)	90 (32)	95 (35)	93 (34)	85 (29)	82 (28)	68 (20)	69 (21)	95 (35)
Mean daily maximum °F (°C)	37.6 (3.1)	38.3 (3.5)	42.8 (6.0)	50.5 (10.3)	59.0 (15.0)	68.4 (20.2)	74.9 (23.8)	74.7 (23.7)	69.4 (20.8)	60.0 (15.6)	51.7 (10.9)	42.8 (6.0)	55.9 (13.3)
Daily mean °F (°C)	30.9 (−0.6)	31.7 (−0.2)	36.7 (2.6)	45.1 (7.3)	53.6 (12.0)	62.6 (17.0)	68.8 (20.4)	68.7 (20.4)	63.6 (17.6)	53.9 (12.2)	45.6 (7.6)	36.5 (2.5)	49.9 (9.9)
Mean daily minimum °F (°C)	24.1 (−4.4)	25.0 (−3.9)	30.7 (−0.7)	39.6 (4.2)	48.1 (8.9)	56.7 (13.7)	62.7 (17.1)	62.6 (17.0)	57.7 (14.3)	47.8 (8.8)	39.6 (4.2)	30.2 (−1.0)	43.8 (6.6)
Record low °F (°C)	−6 (−21)	−4 (−20)	7 (−14)	19 (−7)	33 (1)	44 (7)	51 (11)	47 (8)	40 (4)	31 (−1)	19 (−7)	0 (−18)	−6 (−21)
Average precipitation inches (mm)	3.83 (97)	4.24 (108)	4.85 (123)	4.14 (105)	3.81 (97)	3.41 (87)	3.28 (83)	3.20 (81)	3.83 (97)	4.04 (103)	4.03 (102)	4.38 (111)	47.04 (1,195)
Average snowfall inches (cm)	8.2 (21)	10.3 (26)	3.5 (8.9)	0.6 (1.5)	0 (0)	0 (0)	0 (0)	0 (0)	0 (0)	0 (0)	0.4 (1.0)	3.6 (9.1)	26.6 (68)
Average precipitation days (≥ 0.01 in)	12	10	12	11	11	9	8	8	9	10	11	13	125
Source 1: Western Regional Climate Center (normals 1981–2010, extremes and snow 1972–present)
Source 2: NOAA

=== Wildfires ===
Cape Cod has a long history of wildfire activity. Stephen Pyne, in his fire survey of the northeastern United States, describes the Cape as "among the most flammable landscapes in America" owing to its pitch pine-dominated vegetation, referring to it as "Cape Flame." Indigenous peoples historically used fire to attract game, promote desirable plants, and clear travel routes, and early European settlers continued fire management for agricultural purposes.

The most notable recorded event was the 1887 Cape Cod wildfires, in which at least six distinct fires erupted on May 11, 1887, under abnormally warm and dry conditions. Over 75,000 acres burned across three days, with the fires threatening the towns of Bourne and Falmouth. Subsequent large fires occurred in 1938, 1957, and 1963. A decline in fire activity during the twentieth century, associated with active fire suppression policies, led to denser, more flammable forests. Prescribed fire has been increasingly used in recent decades to manage fuel loads and support disturbance-dependent ecosystems.

== History ==
=== Wampanoag peoples ===
Cape Cod has been the home of the indigenous Wampanoag for centuries prior to European colonization. They lived from the sea and were accomplished farmers. They understood the principles of sustainable forest management, and were known to light controlled fires to keep the underbrush in check. They helped the Pilgrims, who arrived in the fall of 1620, survive at their new Plymouth Colony.

The Wampanoag gradually lost their lands during the period of European incursion through land cessions and violent conflict with white settlers. The 1993 documentary Natives of the Narrowland shows the history of the Wampanoag people through Cape Cod archaeological sites.

In 1974, the Mashpee Wampanoag Tribal Council was formed to articulate the concerns of those with Native American ancestry. They petitioned the federal government in 1975 and again in 1990 for official recognition of the Mashpee Wampanoag as a tribe. In May 2007, the Wampanoag tribe was federally recognized.

=== European exploration ===
Cape Cod was a landmark for early explorers. It may have been the "Promontory of Vinland" mentioned by the Norse voyagers (985–1025), although this is disputed. The Manomet River area (taken up by the western end of the Cape Cod Canal in the early 20th century) is claimed by some to have been visited by Leif Eiriksson, and a stone wall discovered in Provincetown in 1805 is also claimed to have been built by his younger brother Thorvald Eiriksson around AD 1007, when the keel of his ship was repaired in the harbor, according to Norse sagas. He was killed later in the same journey and is said to have been returned to this spot for burial. However, there is no tangible support of the presence of Norse voyagers on Cape Cod, and the view is not generally accepted by archaeologists or historians.

Giovanni da Verrazzano approached it from the south in 1524. He named Martha's Vineyard Claudia, after Claude of France, the wife of Francis I of France. In 1525, Portuguese explorer Estêvão Gomes called it Cabo de las Arenas while sailing under the Spanish crown.

In 1602, Bartholomew Gosnold named the tip Cape Cod, the surviving term and the ninth oldest English place-name in the U.S. Samuel de Champlain charted its sand-silted harbors in 1606, and Henry Hudson landed there in 1609. Captain John Smith noted it on his map of 1614, and at last the Pilgrims entered the "Cape Harbor" and made their first landing near Provincetown on November 11, 1620. They had their first encounter with the native inhabitants in nearby Eastham.

=== European settlement ===
Cape Cod was among the first places settled by Puritan colonists in North America. The Cape's fifteen towns developed slowly, aside from Barnstable (1639), Sandwich (1637), and Yarmouth (1639). The final town to be established on the Cape was Bourne in 1884, breaking off from Sandwich. Provincetown was a group of huts until the 18th century. A channel from Massachusetts Bay to Buzzards Bay is shown on Southack's map of 1717. The present Cape Cod Canal was slowly developed from 1870 to 1914. The federal government purchased it in 1928.

Because of early colonial settlement and intensive land use, the Cape's vegetation was depauperate and trees were scarce by the time that Henry Thoreau saw Cape Cod during his four visits over 1849 to 1857. The settlers heated by fires, and it took 10 to 20 cords (40 to 80 m^{3}) of wood to heat a home, so they cleared most of Cape Cod of timber early on. They planted familiar crops, but these were unsuited to Cape Cod's thin, glacially derived soils. For instance, much of Eastham was planted with wheat. The settlers practiced the burning of woodlands to release nutrients into the soil. Improper and intensive farming led to erosion and the loss of topsoil. Farmers grazed their cattle on the grassy dunes of coastal Massachusetts, only to watch "in horror as the denuded sands 'walked' over richer lands, burying cultivated fields and fences." Dunes on the outer Cape became more common, and many harbors filled in with eroded soils.

By 1800, much of Cape Cod's firewood had to be transported by boat from Maine. The paucity of vegetation was worsened by the raising of merino sheep that reached its peak in New England around 1840. The early Industrial Revolution occurred through much of Massachusetts and Rhode Island, but it mostly bypassed Cape Cod due to a lack of significant waterpower in the area. The Cape developed as a large fishing and whaling center as a result, and also because of its geographic position. After 1860 and the opening of the American West, farmers abandoned agriculture on the Cape. By 1950, forests had recovered to an extent not seen since the 18th century.

=== Modern era ===
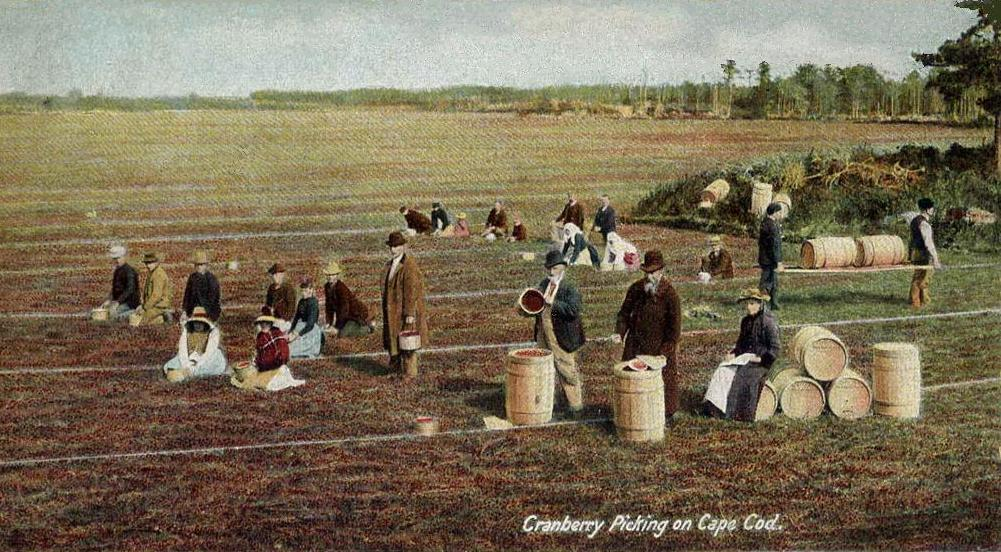
Cranberry picking in 1906

Cape Cod became a summer haven for city dwellers beginning at the end of the 19th century. Improved rail transportation made the towns of the Upper Cape, such as Bourne and Falmouth, accessible to Bostonians. At the beginning of the twentieth century, the Northeastern mercantile elite built many large, shingled "cottages" along Buzzards Bay. The relaxed summer environment offered by Cape Cod was highlighted by writers including Joseph C. Lincoln, who published novels and countless short stories about Cape Cod folks in popular magazines such as The Saturday Evening Post and the Delineator.

Guglielmo Marconi made the first transatlantic Wireless transmission originating in the United States from Cape Cod, at Wellfleet. The beach below the bluffs where his station was located is now called Marconi Beach. In 1914, he began construction of a new transatlantic wireless receiver station in Chatham and a companion transmitter station in Marion. In 1920, the stations were acquired by RCA and, in 1921, Chatham began operations as a maritime radio station communicating to ships at sea using the callsign WCC. WCC supported the communications of Amelia Earhart, Howard Hughes, Admiral Byrd, and the Hindenburg. Marconi chose Chatham due to its vantage point on the Atlantic Ocean, surrounded on three sides by water. Walter Cronkite narrated a 17-minute documentary in 2005 about the history of the Chatham Station.

Much of the east-facing Atlantic seacoast of Cape Cod consists of wide, sandy beaches. In 1961, a significant portion of this coastline, already slated for housing subdivisions, was made a part of the Cape Cod National Seashore by President John F. Kennedy. It was protected from private development and preserved for public use. Large portions are open to the public, including the Marconi Site in Wellfleet. This is a park encompassing the site of the first two-way transoceanic radio transmission from the United States. (Theodore Roosevelt used Marconi's equipment for this transmission.)

The Kennedy Compound in Hyannis Port was President Kennedy's summer White House during his presidency, and the Kennedy family continues to maintain residences on the compound. President Grover Cleveland maintained a summer home in the Gray Gables section of Bourne. Other notable residents of Cape Cod have included actress Julie Harris, US Supreme Court justice Louis Brandeis, figure skater Todd Eldredge, composer and radio personality Canary Burton, and novelists Norman Mailer and Kurt Vonnegut. Influential natives included patriot James Otis, historian and writer Mercy Otis Warren, jurist Lemuel Shaw, and naval officer John Percival.

== Economy ==
Many businesses associated with Cape Cod are represented on the not-for-profit Cape Cod Chamber Of Commerce, Inc. based in Centerville.

== Lighthouses ==
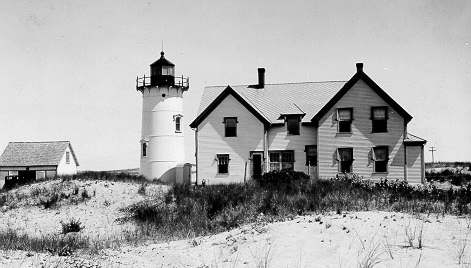
Race Point Lighthouse in Provincetown (1876)

The lighthouses of Cape Cod

"Lighthouses, from ancient times, have fascinated members of the human race. There is something about a lighted beacon that suggests hope and trust and appeals to the better instincts of mankind."

— Edward Rowe Snow

Beginning in 1797, lighthouses were erected along Cape Cod to aid in navigation. Highland Light (or Cape Cod Light) is the oldest and tallest of these, and remains as one of a number of working lighthouses on Cape Cod and the Islands. Many of Cape Cod's earliest lighthouses featured a light tower that was attached directly to – and centered on the roof of – the keeper's dwelling. A stairway to the lantern room was accessible only from the top floor of the house. This came to be known as a Cape Cod style lighthouse, yet today, the only fully intact specimens are on the west coast of the United States.

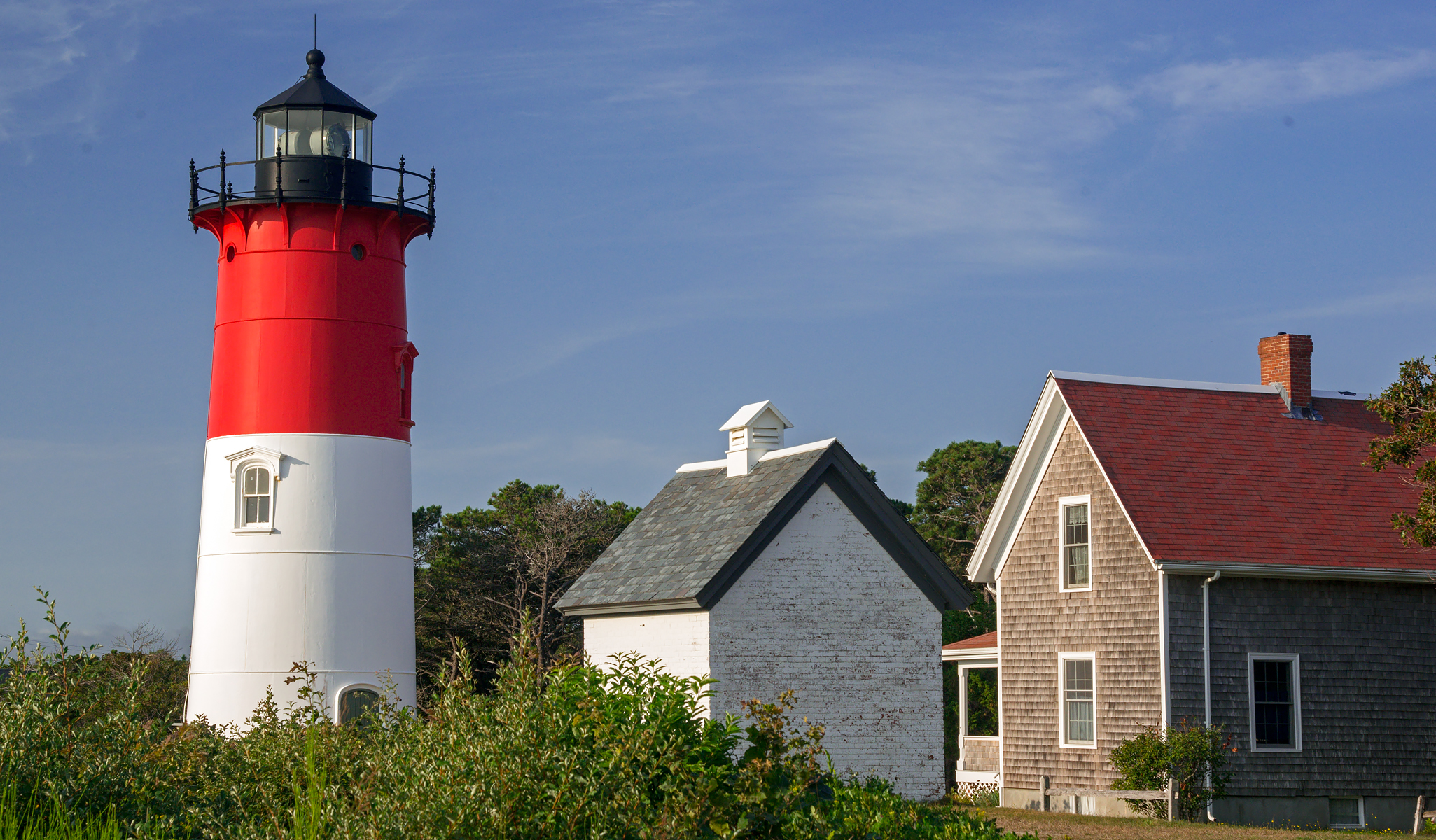
Nauset Light, erected here in 1923 and moved to a safer location in 1996, is on the National Register of Historic Places.

Most of Cape Cod's lighthouses are operated by the U.S. Coast Guard, with some exceptions, such as the Nauset Light, which has been owned since 1997 by the Cape Cod National Seashore (National Park Service) and operated since 2004 in partnership between that agency and the non-profit Nauset Light Preservation Society.

In 1996, both Highland Light and Nauset Light were moved further from the shore because they were each at risk of being lost due to erosion by the sea. Highland Light, then 110 ft (34 m) from the ocean, was moved 450 ft (140 m) to the west, and Nauset Light, 37 ft (11 m) from the bluff, was moved 300 ft (91 m) west.

The lighthouses of Cape Cod include:

- Upper Cape: Nobska Light, Wing's Neck Light (privately owned), and Cleveland Ledge Light (also private).
- Mid Cape: Sandy Neck Light, Hyannis Harbor Light, Lewis Bay Light (or Hyannis Inner Harbor Light, also private), Bishop and Clerks Light, West Dennis Light (formerly the Bass River Light)
- Lower Cape: Chatham Light, Monomoy Point Light, Stage Harbor Light
- Outer Cape: Long Point Light, Wood End Light, Race Point Light, Highland Light, Nauset Light, Three Sisters of Nauset, Mayo Beach Light, Billingsgate Island Light

== Transportation ==
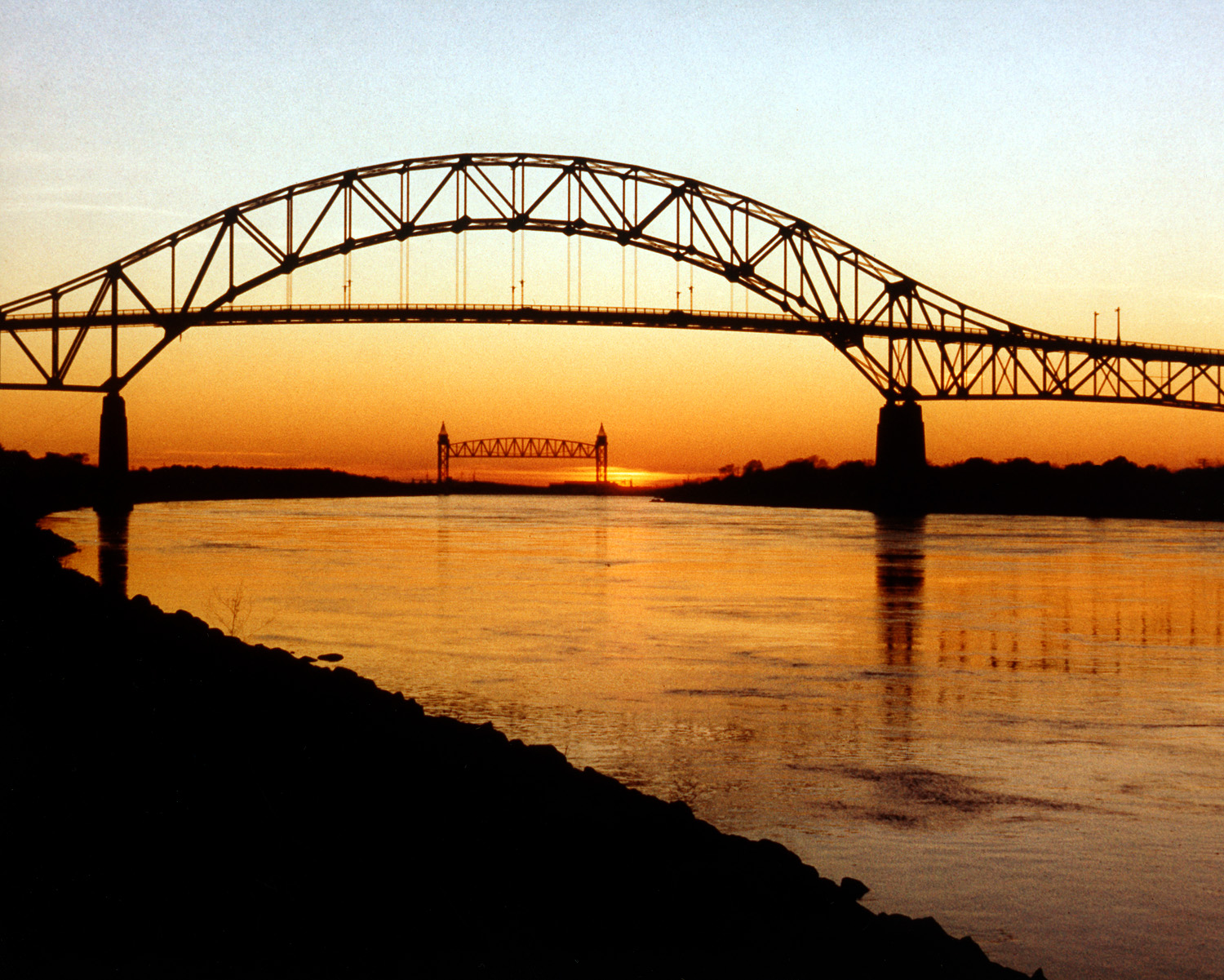
The Bourne Bridge over the Cape Cod Canal, with the Cape Cod Canal Railroad Bridge in the background

=== Road ===
Cape Cod is accessible via Route 3 to the Sagamore Bridge via Boston. Route 6 runs throughout the length of Cape Cod. It is also accessible via I-95 through Providence and then from I-195 to the Bourne Bridge. These two bridges are the lifeline of Cape Cod. The traffic on Cape Cod peaks during the peak season and slows down in the off-season.

The Commonwealth of Massachusetts is planning a $2.4 billion project to build a new bridge from the mainland onto Cape Cod, replacing the Sagamore bridge, which would be the state's largest public works project in decades.

=== Air ===
Cape Cod Gateway Airport is the largest airport on Cape Cod. Cape Air has year-round service there, while other airlines like American Airlines and JetBlue run seasonally. Provincetown Municipal Airport has seasonal Cape Air service in the summer.

There is one military airport at Otis Air National Guard Base.

The closest major airports to Cape Cod are Logan International Airport and Rhode Island T. F. Green International Airport.

=== Ferry service ===
Boston Harbor City Cruises and Bay State Cruise Company run seasonal 90-minute fast ferries between Boston and Provincetown.

=== Bus ===
The Cape Cod Regional Transit Authority runs year-round buses throughout Cape Cod.

Long-distance bus service is available through Plymouth & Brockton and Peter Pan Bus, connecting Cape Cod to South Station and Logan International Airport.

=== Rail service ===
The third bridge over the Cape Cod Canal is a vertical-lift railroad bridge, providing an alternative land transport option. After the bridge, the track splits in two directions, heading towards Hyannis in one direction and North Falmouth in the other. The track to Hyannis is used for both freight and passenger services, while the Falmouth track is used mostly for freight with very limited passenger service.

==== Passenger ====
The CapeFlyer is a seasonal passenger rail service between Boston and Hyannis that operates on summer weekends from Memorial Day through Labor Day.

The Cape Cod Central Railroad is a heritage railroad on Cape Cod. The service is primarily tourist-oriented and includes a dinner train over a scenic route between Hyannis and the Cape Cod Canal lasting about 2 1/2 hours round trip. Select trains feature stops at West Barnstable and Sandwich. Additional service is also provided from the Buzzards Bay station, and a small number of trains also depart from North Falmouth.

==== Freight ====
Active freight service remains in the Upper Cape, both along the main line from Bourne to Hyannis and on the spur to North Falmouth. One of the more frequent operations is the transport of municipal waste to a waste-to-energy plant in Rochester, as well as the removal of debris and refuse from Joint Base Cape Cod in Falmouth. Massachusetts Coastal Railroad is currently the sole operator of freight rail on the Cape, taking over from Bay Colony Railroad in 2007.

==== Historic ====
Daily passenger rail service by the New Haven Railroad from Boston to Cape Cod ended in June 1959. Summertime Day Cape Codder service by the New Haven from New York City to the Cape ended in 1964. In 1978, the tracks east of South Dennis were abandoned and replaced with the Cape Cod Rail Trail. Another bike path, the Shining Sea Bikeway, was built over abandoned tracks between Woods Hole and Falmouth in 1975, and in 2008 the 7.4-mile-long (11.9 km) rail line between Falmouth and North Falmouth was removed and the right-of-way converted into an extension of the Shining Sea Bikeway.

In 1986, Amtrak operated a seasonal service in the summer from New York City to Hyannis called the Cape Codder. From 1988, Amtrak and the Massachusetts Department of Transportation increased service to a daily frequency, until service ended in 1996, leaving a gap until the current CapeFlyer service began in 2013.

=== Bicycle ===
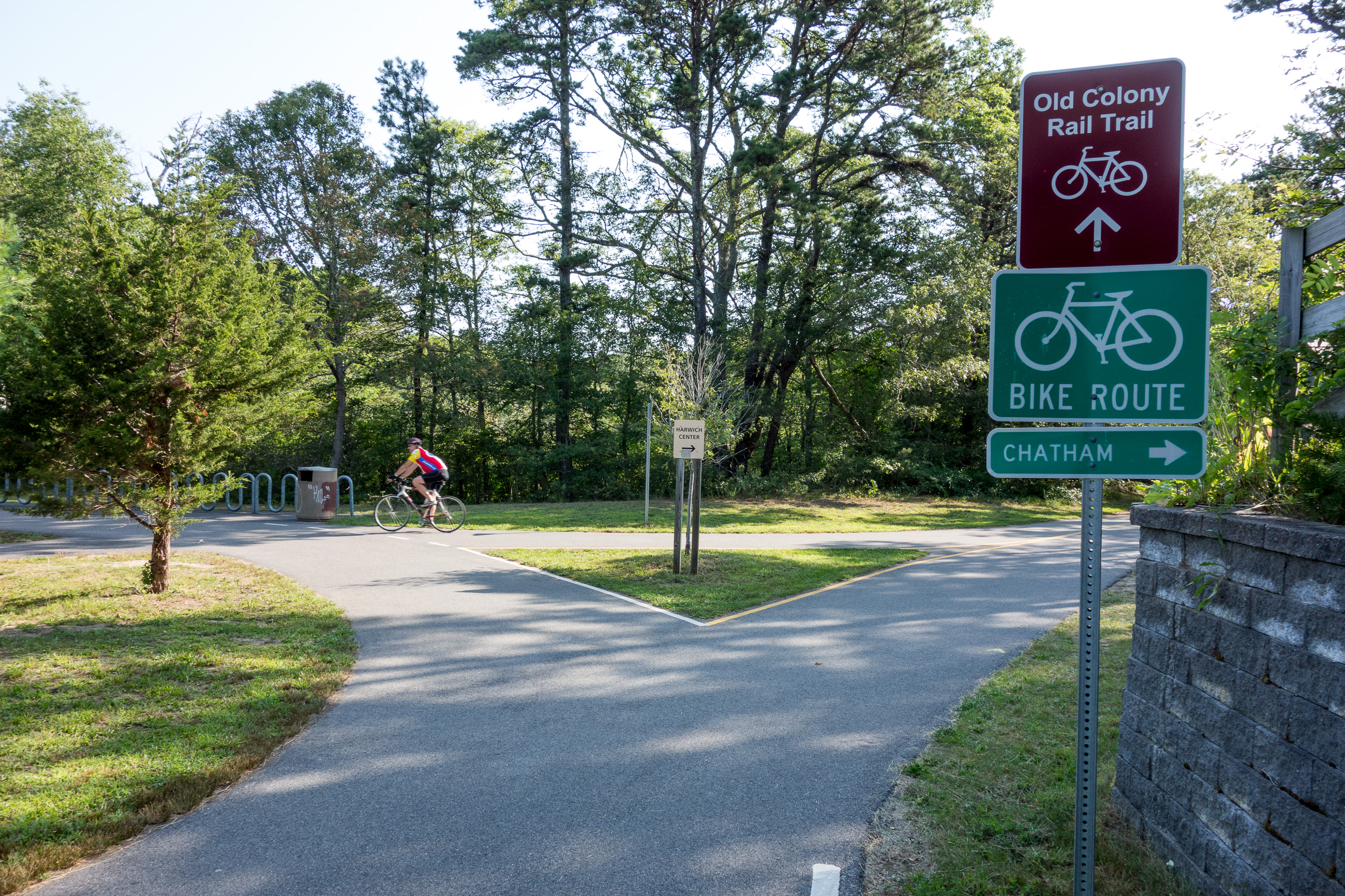
Old Colony Rail Trail in Harwich

Bicycle and pedestrian access to the Cape is possible via a sidewalk on the southbound side of the Bourne Bridge. There are a number of dedicated bike trails and paths around the Cape, including:

- Cape Cod Rail Trail - South Dennis to Wellfleet
- Old Colony Rail Trail - Harwich and Chatham, connecting with the Cape Cod Rail Trail
- Various trails in the Cape Cod National Seashore
- Various trails in Nickerson State Park, connecting with the Cape Cod Rail Trail
- Shining Sea Bikeway - Woods Hole to North Falmouth
- Cape Cod Canal path on both sides of the canal
- Various unpaved Mid-Cape trails

For long-distance biking, the mostly on-road Claire Saltonstall Bikeway connects Cape Cod to the Charles River Bike Path in Boston.

== Tourism ==
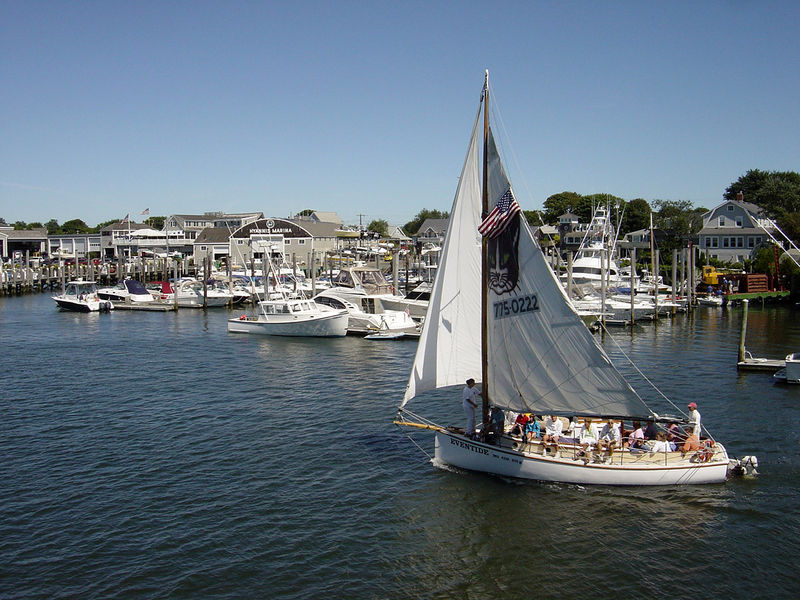
Hyannis Harbor on Nantucket Sound

Cape Cod has a year-round population of about 220,000, and it experiences a tourist season during the warmer months, the beginning and end of which can be roughly approximated as Memorial Day and Columbus Day, respectively. Many businesses specifically target summer visitors, although the "on season" has been expanding somewhat in recent years due to Indian Summer, reduced lodging rates, the number of people visiting the Cape after Labor Day who have no school-age children, and the elderly—reducing the true "off-season" to six or seven months. In the late 20th century, tourists and owners of second homes began visiting the Cape more and more in the spring and fall, softening the definition of the high season and expanding it somewhat.

Provincetown berths the original East Coast whale watching fleet (Dolphin Fleet) who patrol the Stellwagen Bank National Marine Sanctuary. The fleet guarantees a whale sighting (mostly humpback whale, fin whale, minke whale, sei whale, and the critically endangered North Atlantic right whale) and is the only federally certified operation qualified to rescue whales. Provincetown has also long been known as an art colony, attracting writers and artists. The town is home to the Cape's most attended art museum, the Provincetown Art Association and Museum.

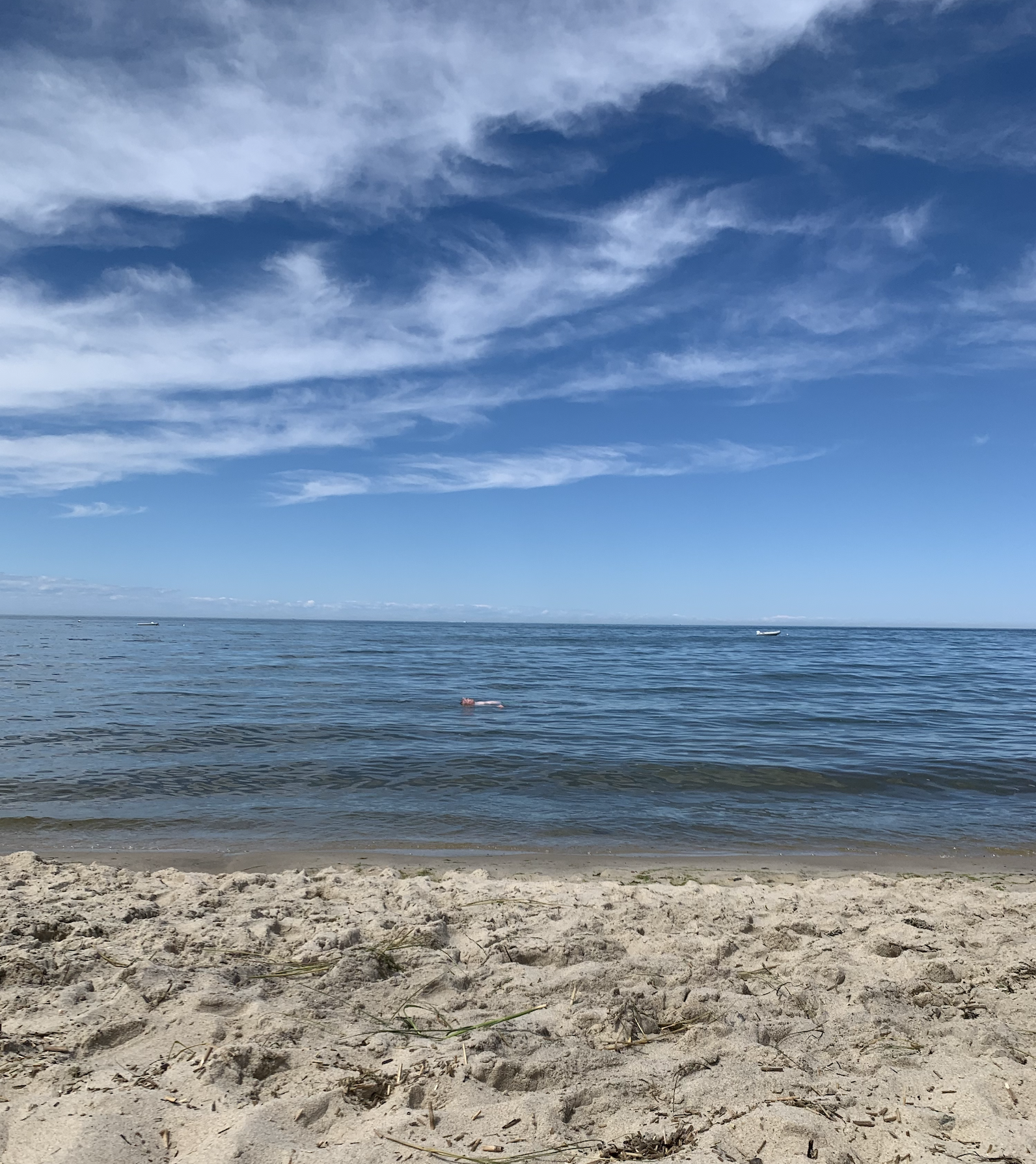
A beach on Cape Cod

Cape Cod is a popular destination for beachgoers from all over, with 559.6 miles (900.6 km) of coastline. Beaches—both public and private—are easily accessible. The Cape has upwards of sixty public beaches, many of which offer parking for non-residents for a daily fee (in summer). The Cape Cod National Seashore has 40 miles (64 km) of sandy beach and many walking paths.

Cape Cod is also popular for its outdoor activities, such as beach walking, biking, boating, fishing, go-karts, golfing, kayaking, miniature golf, and unique shopping. There are 27 public, daily-fee golf courses and 15 private courses on Cape Cod. Bed and breakfasts or vacation houses are often used for lodging.

Each summer, the Naukabout Music Festival is held at the Barnstable County Fair Grounds located in East Falmouth, typically during the first weekend of August. The festival features local, regional, and national talent, along with food, arts, and family-friendly activities. Some particularly well-known Cape products and industries include cranberries, shellfish (particularly oysters and clams), and lobstering.

=== Sport fishing ===
Cape Cod is known around the world as a spring-to-fall destination for sport anglers. Among the species most widely pursued are striped bass, bluefish, bluefin tuna, false albacore (little tunny), bonito, tautog, flounder and fluke. The Cape Cod Bay side of the Cape, from Sandwich to Provincetown, has numerous harbors, saltwater creeks, and shoals that hold bait fish and attract the larger game fish, such as striped bass, bluefish and bluefin tuna.

The outer edge of the Cape, from Provincetown to Falmouth, faces the open Atlantic from Provincetown to Chatham, and then the more protected water of Nantucket and Vineyard Sounds, from Chatham to Falmouth. The bays, harbors and shoals along this coastline also provide a robust habitat for game species, and during the late summer months warm-water species such as mahi-mahi and marlin will also appear on the southern edge of Cape Cod's waters. Nearly every harbor on Cape Cod hosts sport fishing charter boats, which run from May through October.

One of the most popular fishing spots on the East Coast is the Cape Cod Canal. Striped bass, especially, in season attract anglers from far and wide. A large part of the attraction involves ease of access. Ample free parking exists all along the waterway, and the banks are a short walk from one's vehicle. This reduces fishing to the basics – a pole and a few lures.

== Sports ==
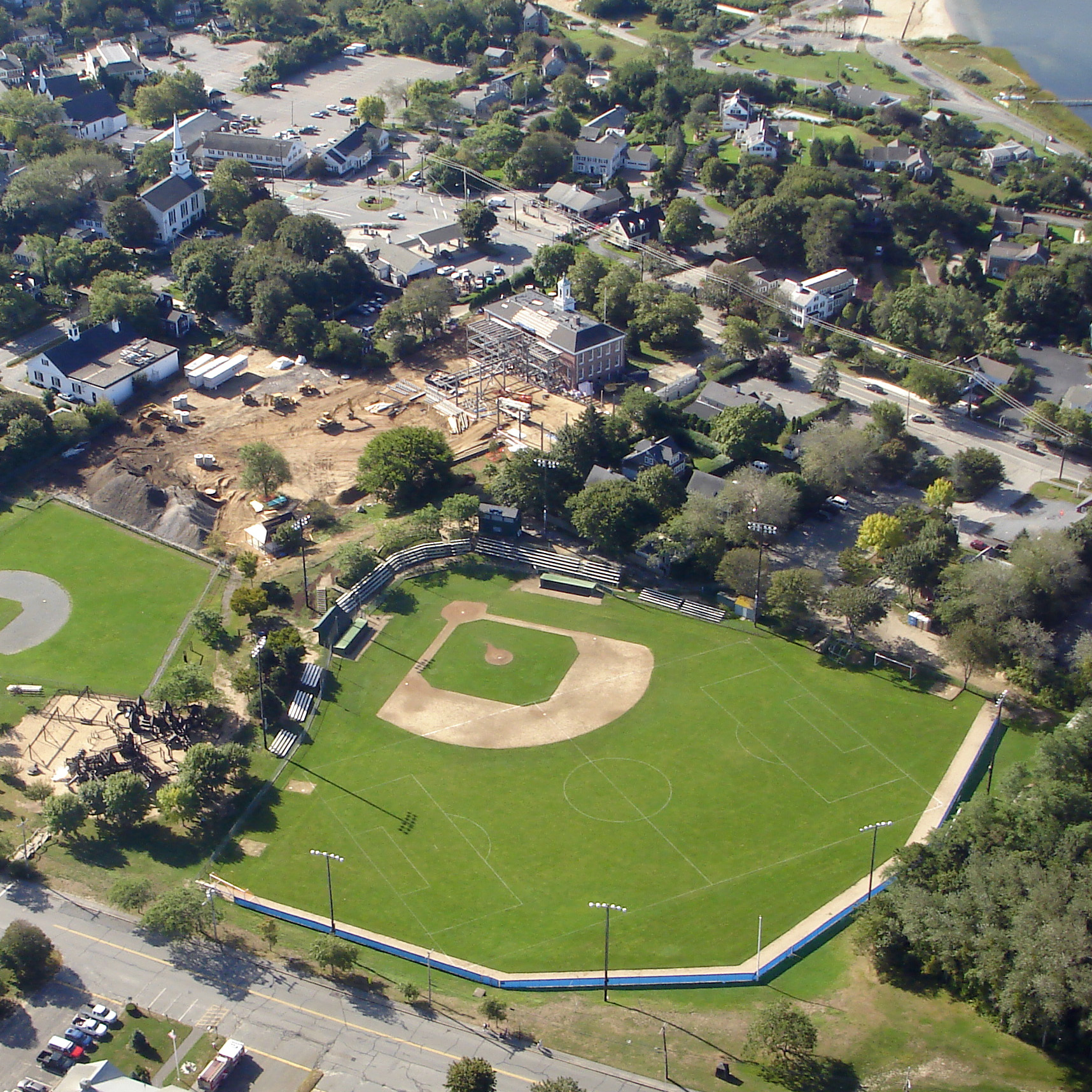
Veterans Field in Chatham, Massachusetts, home of the Chatham Anglers

The Cape has nine amateur baseball franchises playing within Barnstable County in the Cape Cod Baseball League. The Wareham Gatemen also play in the Cape Cod Baseball League in nearby Wareham in Plymouth County. The league's beginning is unsettled, even fanciful. Without any basis whatsoever, some claim a start date of 1875. However, the first Cape Cod League was formed in Sandwich in 1910. It did not last. Three years later, in 1913, another Cape Cod Baseball League was organized. This venture lasted two years. In 1916, a third attempt at league play barely got off the ground. Then, in 1923, an initial four teams met in Hyannis and started a successful federation along the lines of the present league. Outstanding players from throughout the region competed until the war effort led to a shutdown in 1940. In 1946, the local town teams from the prewar County Twilight League and Lower Cape Cod League organized under the Cape Cod Baseball League banner. As the years passed, local players were moved aside by outside college stars. Finally, in 1963, the league became a wholly summer collegiate circuit sanctioned by the National Collegiate Athletic Association with some Major League financial support. The current teams in the league are the Bourne Braves, Brewster Whitecaps, Chatham Anglers (formerly the Chatham Athletics), Cotuit Kettleers, Falmouth Commodores, Harwich Mariners, Hyannis Harbor Hawks (formerly the Hyannis Mets), Orleans Firebirds (formerly the Orleans Cardinals), Wareham Gatemen and the Yarmouth–Dennis Red Sox. MLB scouts frequent the games in the summer, looking for stars of the future.

Along with the Cape Cod Baseball League and the former junior hockey team, the Cape Cod Islanders, many high school players are being recruited as well. Barnstable and Harwich have each sent multiple players to Division 1 colleges for baseball. Harwich has also won three state titles since 1996 (1996, 2006, 2007). Bourne and Sandwich, rivals in hockey, have each won state championships recently, Bourne in 2004 and Sandwich in 2007. Nauset won their first state championship in hockey in 2025. Barnstable and Martha's Vineyard are also considered state hockey powerhouses. Barnstable and Falmouth hold the title of having one of the longest Thanksgiving football rivalries in the country. The teams have played each other every year on Thanksgiving since 1895. High school football teams on the Cape have also recently become successful and the region has also become a hot spot for college recruiting. In 2011, four high school football teams from the Cape won state championships in their respective divisions; Dennis-Yarmouth (Division 2A), Bourne (Division 3A), Mashpee (Division 4), as well as Nantucket and Upper Cape Cod Tech (Division 5). Also, numerous other Cape schools have made appearances in the football state championship game recently, including Barnstable in 2012, Martha's Vineyard in 2008, Cape Cod Tech in 2006, and Dennis-Yarmouth in 2013. The Bourne and Barnstable girls' volleyball teams are two of the best teams in the state and Barnstable is considered one of the best programs in the country. Bourne won the state title in 2003 and 2007, and Barnstable has won 12 Division 1 state titles in the past 13 years and has won the state title three consecutive seasons (2011 to 2013). In the 2010 cross-country season, Sturgis Charter Public School's Division 4 cross-country team remained virtually unbeaten throughout their running season.

The end of each summer is marked with the running of the Falmouth Road Race, held on the third Sunday in August. It draws about 10,000 runners to the Cape and showcases the finest runners in the world (mainly for the large purse that the race is able to offer). The race is 7.0 miles (11.3 km) long, which is a non-standard distance. The reason for the unusual distance is that the man who thought the race up (Tommy Leonard) was a bartender who wanted a race along the coast from one bar (The Cap'n Kidd in Woods Hole) to another (The Brothers Four in Falmouth Heights). While the bar in Falmouth Heights is now the British Beer Company, the race still starts at the front door of the Cap'n Kidd in Woods Hole and now finishes at the beach in Falmouth Heights. Prior to the Falmouth race is an annual 5-mile (8.0 km) race through Brewster called the Brew Run, held early in August.

== Education ==
Every town on the Cape has access to elementary, middle, and high school education, although some schools service several towns. These schools include Dennis-Yarmouth Regional High School, located in Yarmouth, which serves Yarmouth and Dennis; Monomoy Regional High School, located in Harwich, which serves Harwich and Chatham; and Nauset Regional High School in Eastham, which serves the towns of Brewster, Orleans, Eastham, Wellfleet, Truro, and Provincetown.

Barnstable High School is the Cape's largest. Sturgis Charter Public School, a public charter school in Hyannis, is open to students from the Cape and surrounding regions, extending as far as Plymouth. The Cape also has two vocational high schools. One is the Cape Cod Regional Technical High School in Harwich, and the other is Upper Cape Cod Regional Technical High School in Bourne.

In 1976 the Cape schools and districts petitioned the Massachusetts Legislature to create an educational collaborative, the Cape Cod Collaborative, to facilitate cooperation and efficiency in providing gifted and talented, and special needs programs. With locations in Osterville and Bourne the Cape Cod Collaborative provides transportation services, professional development, autism support, developmental training, itinerant services and an alternative education program. Each summer, in cooperation with the Massachusetts Maritime Academy, it operates a science-based program for gifted and talented students from around the Cape.

Mashpee High School is home to the Mashpee Chapter of SMPTE, the Society of Motion Picture and Television Engineers. This chapter is the first and only high-school chapter in the world to be a part of this organization and has received much recognition within the Los Angeles broadcasting industry as a result.

In addition to public schools, Cape Cod has a wide range of private schools. The town of Barnstable has Trinity Christian Academy, Cape Cod Academy, St Francis Xavier Preparatory School, and Saint John Paul II High School. Sandwich offers the Waldorf School of Cape Cod, Harwich offers the Lighthouse Charter School for elementary and middle-school students, and Falmouth offers Falmouth Academy. Riverview School is located in East Sandwich and is a special co-ed boarding school that serves students as old as 22 who have learning disabilities.

Cape Cod contains three institutions of higher education. One is the Cape Cod Community College located in West Barnstable. The second is Massachusetts Maritime Academy in the village of Buzzards Bay. Massachusetts Maritime Academy is the oldest continuously operating maritime college in the United States. The third is Bridgewater State University, which opened a satellite campus in South Yarmouth in January 2015. The school will provide 40 undergraduate and graduate courses leading to the completion of bachelor's degree and master's degree programs in Early Childhood Education, Educational Leadership, Secondary Education, Reading, and Special Education. The campus will also offer Certificate Programs in Business and Social Work. Undergraduate credit courses in History are also available.

== In popular culture and art ==
- The book Cape Cod, written by naturalist Henry David Thoreau about his 1849 travels there, was published posthumously in 1865.
- The Cape Codder cocktail is named after the peninsula; both are notable for cranberry. Cape Cod also generated a distinctive Cape style house and Cape lighthouse.
- In 1928, the writer Henry Beston published the classic The Outermost House. The author spent a year living in a beachside cottage in Eastham, Massachusetts and the book is about his experiences there.

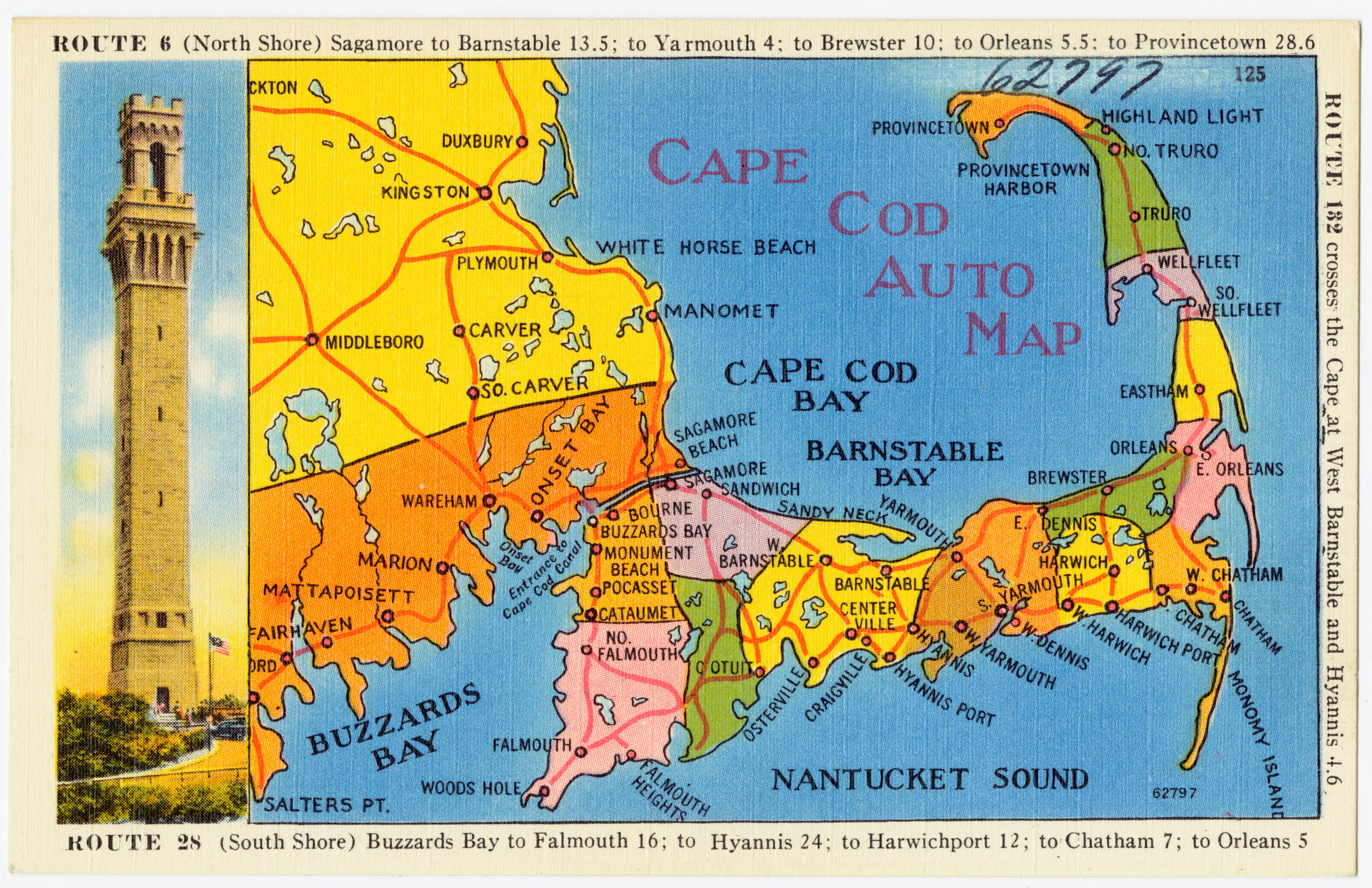
Cape Cod Auto Map, 1930s–40s postcard by Tichnor Bros. of Boston

- Edward Hopper owned a summer house in Truro and painted numerous Cape scenes including: Corn Hill (1930), Highland Light, North Truro (1930), Rich's House (1930), High Road (1931), House on Dune Edge (1931), Cold Storage Plant (1933), and Cottages at North Truro (1936).
- The popular record "Old Cape Cod," sung by Patti Page, published in 1957 praises the destination of Cape Cod.
- In 1996, Massachusetts began issuing a "Cape & Islands" specialty registration plate.
- In 2001, the film Summer Catch was released. It is a romantic comedy about a baseball player, portrayed by Freddie Prinze Jr., in the Cape Cod Baseball League and his love interest, played by Jessica Biel.
- In 2007, the band Vampire Weekend released the songs "Cape Cod Kwassa Kwassa" and "Walcott." Both songs reference Cape Cod.
- In 2015, HBO released a documentary, Heroin: Cape Cod, about the drug epidemic on the Cape.
- In 2020, Allie X released an album Cape God, which was inspired by the documentary.

== See also ==
- Mayflower
- Wildfire history of Cape Cod
