= Point Montara Light =

Lighthouse in California, United States

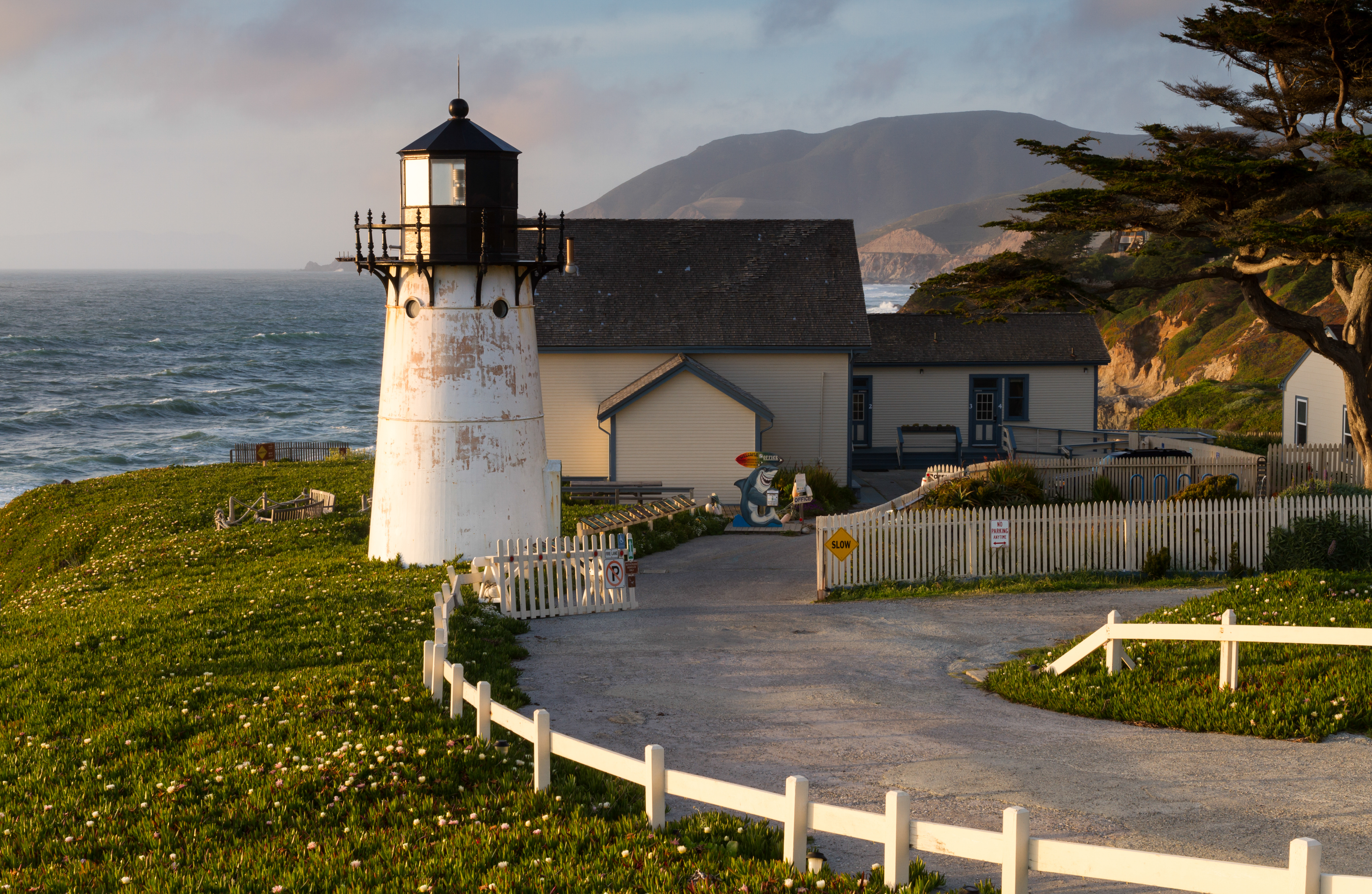
- Point Montara Lighthouse
- Location: Point Montara; Montara, California; United States
- Coordinates: 37.536503°N 122.519311°W

Tower
- Constructed: 1881^{A} (Current); 1900 (First)
- Foundation: concrete base
- Construction: steel tower
- Automated: 1970
- Height: 30 feet (9.1 m)
- Shape: tapered cylindrical tower with balcony and lantern
- Operator: Montara State Beach
- Heritage: National Register of Historic Places listed place, California Points of Historical Interest

Light
- First lit: 1900 (First); 1928 (Current)
- Focal height: 70 feet (21 m)
- Lens: Fourth order Fresnel lens (1912), FA 251 lens (current)
- Range: 14 nmi (26 km; 16 mi)
- Characteristic: Fl W 5s.
- Point Montara Light Station
- U.S. National Register of Historic Places
- Area: 7.3 acres (3.0 ha)
- Built: 1874
- Built by: United States Lighthouse Service
- Architectural style: Gothic, Lighthouse
- MPS: Light Stations of California MPS
- NRHP reference No.: 91001094
- Added to NRHP: September 3, 1991

The Point Montara Light is a lighthouse in Montara, California, United States, on the southern approach to the San Francisco Bay, California approximately 25 miles south of San Francisco.

== History ==
Point Montara Lighthouse was established in February 1875. It originally had a kerosene lantern, but was upgraded in 1912 to a fourth order Fresnel lens. The current tower was first erected in 1881 in Wellfleet, Massachusetts as the Mayo Beach Lighthouse. In 1925, the cast iron tower from the discontinued Mayo Beach Light was disassembled and moved to Yerba Buena. It was moved and rebuilt as the Point Montara Light station in 1928, where it stands today. The lens was transferred to the San Mateo Historical Society when the lighthouse was automated in 1970, and is currently on display at the library at the College of Notre Dame in Belmont, California.

The lighthouse is not open to the public, and is the site of a youth hostel sponsored by Hostelling International USA (part of Hostelling International). It was added to the National Register of Historic Places in 1991.

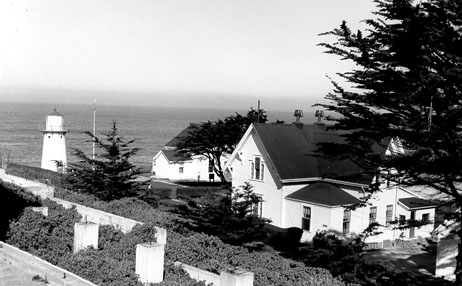
Undated USCG photo

The following was written prior to 1970: "Three men, including a First Class Boatswains Mate, as Officer-in-Charge, operate Point Montara Light, which provides a light and fog signal. This is a family station with quarters in a duplex constructed in 1961, which contains a 3 bedroom unit. A house built in 1863 provides quarters with a 2 bedroom and a separate relief keepers quarters. The station has no small boats assigned, but does have a pickup truck. Personnel and dependents at Point Montara utilize Government medical facilities, commissary and post exchange in the San Francisco area. The nearest school is within walking distance (1/4 mile) from the station."

In 2001 the lighthouse, specifically the hostel, was used in the film Bandits (2001 film) starring Bruce Willis, Cate Blanchett and Billy Bob Thornton. The location was converted into a small roadside inn. .

== Marine Protected Areas ==
Montara State Marine Reserve & Pillar Point State Marine Conservation Area extend offshore from Montara. Like underwater parks, these marine protected areas help conserve ocean wildlife and marine ecosystems.

== See also ==
- List of lighthouses in the United States

== Note ==
A. The current tower was first built in Massachusetts in 1881, it was moved in 1928 where it currently stands as the most recent Point Montara Light.
