= 1887 Cape Cod wildfires =

Series of wildfires on Cape Cod, Massachusetts in May 1887

1887 Cape Cod Wildfires
- Date: May 11–13, 1887
- Location: Cape Cod, Massachusetts, United States
- Cause: Abnormally warm and dry weather; various ignition sources
- Deaths: 0
- Property damage: Thousands of dollars (1887 USD)

The 1887 Cape Cod wildfires were a series of wildfires that burned across Cape Cod, Massachusetts, in May 1887. At least six distinct fires erupted on May 11, driven by abnormally warm and dry conditions. Over the course of three days, more than 75,000 acres burned and thousands of dollars in property damage accrued. The fires were part of a broader wave of wildfires that erupted across the northeastern and midwestern United States during the late nineteenth century.

== Background ==
Cape Cod has a long fire history that predates European settlement. Indigenous peoples used fire to attract game, promote desirable plants, and clear travel routes. Early European settlers continued to use fire management for agricultural purposes until widespread agricultural abandonment in the nineteenth century. Historian Stephen Pyne describes Cape Cod as "among the most flammable landscapes in America" because of its vegetation, referring to it informally as "Cape Flame."

The landscape is dominated by pitch pine (Pinus rigida), a fire-dependent tree that only successfully establishes after disturbance and can survive fire with its thick bark; it also encourages fire with its flammable sap. Other common species include huckleberry and blueberry, which can resprout after fire because of their extensive networks of below-ground stems. Without disturbance such as fire, these species are often outcompeted by more shade-tolerant species.

== The fires of May 1887 ==
=== Conditions and causes ===
The proximate cause of the fires was abnormally warm and dry weather. Records from the United States Signal Service for May 1887 indicate that the region received around 60% of expected rainfall and was approximately 4 °F (c. 2.2 °C) warmer than the monthly average. Atmospheric pressure in the region was also well above normal; the highest pressure observed in the country during May was recorded near Falmouth (30.09 inHg).

The immediate cause of each individual fire varied. One was reportedly started by "huckleberry parties"—people who may have been burning vegetation to promote fruit production, an ordinarily benign practice that could lead to large fires under dry conditions.

=== Course of the fires ===
At least six distinct fires erupted on May 11, 1887. With limited access to steam fire engines, local residents fought the fires with shovels and whatever equipment they could acquire. They also frequently lit backfires—burns intentionally set ahead of an approaching wildfire to consume fuel and slow its advance. This action likely saved the village of Bourne from destruction. Despite these efforts, the fire spread approximately 20 miles (c. 32 km) to the south and threatened the town of Falmouth. By the following day the fires had yet to be contained, and over 50,000 acres had already burned.

Only with the help of over 1,000 men were the fires largely extinguished by May 13. In total, more than 75,000 acres burned and thousands of dollars in property damage accrued. No lives were lost.

=== Contemporary accounts ===
The Boston Daily Globe published accounts of the fires on May 13 and 14, 1887, describing "huge flames" lighting up the sky and "dense clouds of smoke" enveloping neighboring towns. The paper later called the fires "the most disastrous in the memory of man." A diary entry by local official Ebenezer S. Whittemore noted a "large forest fire to-day, which started from near Bournedale" and then spread to "Forestdale & beyond."

The fires were part of a broader collection of wildfires across the northeastern and midwestern United States during the late nineteenth century. That they stood out even within this fire-prone era illustrates their cultural impact. Their close proximity—around 50 miles (80 km)—to Boston likely amplified that resonance.

== Ecology ==
Despite the evident contemporary impact of the fires on human communities, the destruction was not necessarily an ecological disaster. The Cape Cod landscape had evolved with fire over millennia. Pitch pine forests depend on periodic disturbance to maintain their composition; fire-adapted species such as huckleberry and blueberry regenerate readily after burning.

Evidence of fire's historical role in the region comes from multiple sources: patterns in fire scars within tree-ring chronologies, charcoal and pollen deposition in sediment cores, Indigenous knowledge, and fire-adaptive traits exhibited by plant and wildlife species.

== Fire suppression and its consequences ==
A marked decline in fire activity beginning in the early twentieth century contributed to the widespread perception that fire had not played a substantial role in the region's ecology. This recent absence is considered an outlier in the context of the Cape's longer fire history.

During the early twentieth century, governmental agencies pursued a policy of near-total fire exclusion—the "Smokey Bear" era—which led to widespread ecological change. Alongside driving declines in disturbance-dependent biodiversity, the removal of fire promoted forests densely packed with flammable vegetation, leaving the region more susceptible to wildfires of historically unusual severity.

Future residents of the region experienced other significant fires, including a blaze in 1938 that killed three firefighters, and further fires in 1957 and 1963.

== Present and future fire risk ==
Climate change is projected to substantially increase fire activity across the region. The fall 2024 fire season was notably active relative to recent baselines. Researchers argue that managing Cape Cod for fire risk—as well as for its more familiar role as a coastal recreation destination—should be a priority.

Prescribed fire is increasingly used on Cape Cod as a tool to reduce hazardous fuel loads and promote disturbance-dependent biodiversity. Prescribed burns are conducted by trained professionals under predetermined weather and forest conditions to accomplish specific management objectives. Such efforts have increased in recent years, including burns in ecosystems compositionally similar to those that burned in 1887. The 1887 fires are cited as evidence of the landscape's capacity to burn at large scales, and as a historical case study relevant to other regions that have experienced recent fire deficits.

== See also ==
- Wildfire history of Cape Cod

== Bibliography ==
- "Forest Fires Raging: Southern Plymouth and Northern Barnstable County Towns Greatly Damaged — Loss Estimated at $50,000." Boston Daily Globe, 13 May 1887, p. 2.
- Gao, Peng; Terando, Adam J.; Kupfer, John A.; Morgan Varner, J.; Stambaugh, Michael C.; Lei, Ting L.; Kevin Hiers, J. (2021). "Robust projections of future fire probability for the conterminous United States". Science of the Total Environment. 789 147872. Bibcode:2021ScTEn.78947872G. doi:10.1016/j.scitotenv.2021.147872. PMID 34082198.
- "Heaven-Kissing Flames: Light Up the Sky Over All Cape Cod — Narrow Escape of Many Towns in the Vicinity of Wareham — Forest Fires and Small Blazes all Over New England." Boston Daily Globe, 14 May 1887, p. 2.
- Patterson III, William, and Kenneth Sassaman. "Indian Fires in the Prehistory of New England." In Holocene Human Ecology in Northeastern North America, edited by George Nicholas. Plenum Press, 1988.
- Pyne, Stephen J. The Northeast: A Fire Survey. Tucson: The University of Arizona Press, 2019.
- United States Signal Service. "May, 1887." Monthly Weather Review 15, no. 5 (1887): 127–53.
- Vander Yacht, Andrew L.; Gilvarg, Samuel C.; Varner, J. Morgan; Stambaugh, Michael C. (2024). "Future increases in fire should inform present management of fire-infrequent forests: A post-smoke critique of "asbestos" paradigms in the northeastern USA and beyond". Biological Conservation. 296 110703. Bibcode:2024BCons.29610703V. doi:10.1016/j.biocon.2024.110703.
