= Mayo Beach Light =

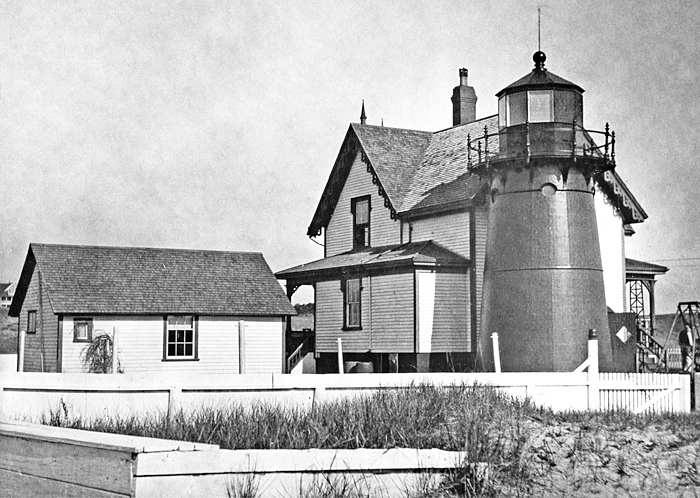
- The second Mayo Beach Light in 1915 (USCG)
- Location: Mayo Beach on Cape Cod
- Coordinates: 41.9307°N 70.0343°W

Tower
- Constructed: 1837 (first light); 1881 (second light)
- Construction: Cast iron
- Height: 25 ft. (second light)
- Shape: Cylindrical

Light
- Deactivated: 1922

The Mayo Beach Light was an early lighthouse on Cape Cod. Deactivated in 1922, the second tower was moved to California and re-erected as the Point Montara Light in 1928.

== History ==
This light was erected to help guide boats into the Wellfleet, Massachusetts harbor. The first light consisted of a brick house with a lantern set in the center of the roof. The usual multiple lamp and reflector system of the day was used, though four of the ten lamps were found to shine over land only and were shortly discontinued. Ironically, three wrecks occurred in the light's vicinity within the first fifteen years of its operation.

In 1857 the light was upgraded with a Fresnel lens. The condition of the house was reviled by early keepers, and Stephen Pleasonton, the first federal supervisor of lighthouses, had requested the light's disestablishment. Nevertheless, it remained in service until 1881.

In that year a totally new light was erected on the same location. This consisted of a 30-foot cast iron cylindrical tower lined with brick, which stood immediately adjacent to a newly erected keeper's house, the old building having been demolished as an obstruction. This light remained in service until 1922, when the station was discontinued. The keeper's house was sold to a private concern, and the tower was removed; its circular foundation remains visible next to the house. The house can still be seen on Kendrick Avenue in Wellfeet, or on Google Street View. Just to the left and behind the house, the picturesque original oil storage shed for the lighthouse can still be seen and is often the subject of photographs and paintings itself.

For many years it was believed that the tower was demolished around 1939. However, research in 2008 showed that the tower had not been scrapped, but had instead been transported across the country and re-erected at the Point Montara Light, replacing a wooden framework tower erected in 1912. Evidence for the move was found in the form of letters detailing the transfer, which were uncovered by Colleen MacNeney. The lighthouse is now a functioning lighthouse in California, using an FA25 lens, and can be visited at the Point Montara Youth Hostel that is owns the property. Mayo Beach Light is also notable as having an early female keeper. Sarah Atwood succeeded her husband in 1876 and served until 1891.
