= Billingsgate Island Light =

Lighthouse in Massachusetts, United States

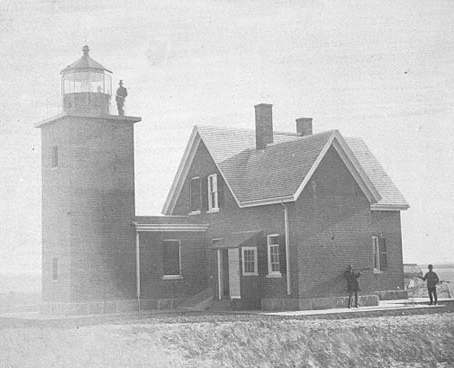
- US Coast Guard photo
- Location: Wellfleet, Massachusetts
- Coordinates: 41°52′18″N 70°4′8.35″W

Tower
- Constructed: 1822
- Foundation: Granite
- Construction: Brick
- Shape: Square
- Markings: Red with black lantern
- Fog signal: none

Light
- First lit: 1858 (last structure)
- Deactivated: destroyed by storm 1915
- Focal height: 41 feet (12 m)
- Lens: Fourth order Fresnel lens
- Range: 12 nautical miles (22 km; 14 mi)
- Characteristic: F W

Billingsgate Island Light was located on what is still called Billingsgate Island though it is underwater at high tide, at the entrance to the harbor in Wellfleet, Massachusetts, United States.

== History ==
The Billingsgate Island Light was a famous historic landmark located on what was once an inhabited island in Cape Cod, Massachusetts. When the island was habitable, the Billingsgate Island light was an important landmark to all fishermen and seamen. The light was constructed in 1822, but its light was not lit until 1858 due to construction. The Billingsgate Island Light stood tall at 41 feet. Since modern building technology was not yet integrated in architecture, the Island light had a base foundation of granite and wall construction made of brick and mortar. Since electric lights were not invented until 1879 by Thomas Edison, the Billingsgate Island light's primary source of power was kerosene fuel. The preferred lens used by the Island light was called a Fresnel lens. At this time in history, Fresnel lenses were the most advanced in lighthouse lens technology. Fresnel lenses used a series of prisms and patterns within the glass itself which acted like a diamond. Fresnel lenses weighed roughly five to eight tons based on their size. The Fresnel lens was capable of reaching visible distances of 12–26 nautical miles.]

== Billingsgate town ==
Billingsgate Island was a large fishing village located in Cape Cod Bay, Massachusetts. Billingsgate became its own town with its own baseball team, a school and more than thirty homes. Before the construction of the Billingsgate Island light, there was another lighthouse, but it was also destroyed in a storm. In the storm that destroyed the light in 1915, all residents fled Billingsgate before the storm came, floating all of their homes and personal belongings across the bay. The only two people left on the island as the storm passed were the lighthouse keeper and the shellfish keeper who ended up dying in the flood. What is left of Billingsgate Island is only visible at low tide. Most of what is left on Billingsgate Island was either later torn down in the 1930s and 1940s or destroyed by coastal erosion. Billingsgate Island is commonly referred to as Mini-Atlantis because it was once a community where people lived but is now underwater. The Billingsgate fishing community was known for fishing and capturing Sea Bass, Tuna and whale fishing. Currently Billingsgate is only accessible by boat and at low tide. Today, it is used as a picnic area and for shell-fishing.

== Land purchase ==
Billingsgate Island was originally a public use land shared by Native Americans and commercial fishermen. On July 2, 1822, the U.S. government purchased four acres of the original 60 acres of land on the island including the Billingsgate Island light for only $100. The United States government decided to construct a thirty-nine foot wall barrier between the ocean and the coastline of Billingsgate in-order to try to preserve and protect the Island light from storms. After the first wall was built, the ground beneath quickly eroded and split Billingsgate Island in half. After the Island split in half, the government decided to build another wall, this time towering 100 feet tall. Instead of being beneficial to the lighthouse and the community of Billingsgate, it did the opposite, speeding up the erosion process of the island.

== Construction ==
The Billingsgate Island light was in operation from 1858 to 1915, when it was destroyed in a storm in 1915. The Billingsgate storm of 1915 was strong enough to not only destroy the lighthouse, but also completely wipe the town of Billingsgate off the face of the earth. The only thing left of the Billingsgate Island is the granite foundation of the Island Light. The tower shape was square, which was quite unusual for lighthouse architecture. Most lighthouses constructed at the time were circular. Lighthouse shapes were primarily circular because they were stronger. Other than the lighthouse being destroyed by a storm in 1915, the lighthouse's architecture was one of the main reasons for its failure to stand. The Billingsgate lighthouse when first constructed, had only one Fresnel lens, but then was later replaced with eight oil lamps (Fresnel), newer and stronger which were capable of reaching longer distances.The roof of the lighthouse was painted a bright red and black swirl so that it was most visible at longer distances.

== Keepers ==
Lighthouse keepers lived inside of lighthouses anywhere from a week to a few years at a time. In older times, they had to stay awake for hours at a time to rewind the lighthouse's turning mechanism for the light and relay communication to ships that land was near. They also helped ship pilots navigate the waterways through Morse code and later, proper radio communication. Lighthouse keepers were required to be a middle aged man with a high school education, clean and orderly, with a family and the ability to communicate with formal ship communication techniques. Lighthouse keepers were held to an oath to keep the light of the lens lit every day of the year, no matter the conditions. In the case of the Keeper of Billingsgate Island light, he stood watch till the death and complete deactivation of the lighthouse in 1915.
