= Billingsgate Island =

Island in Cape Cod Bay, Massachusetts

Coordinates: 41°52′14.29″N 70°04′07.03″W

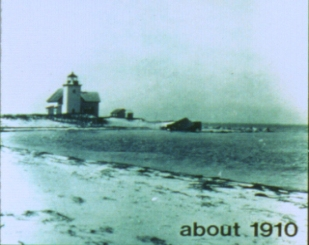
Eroding shoreline of Billingsgate Island, about 1910

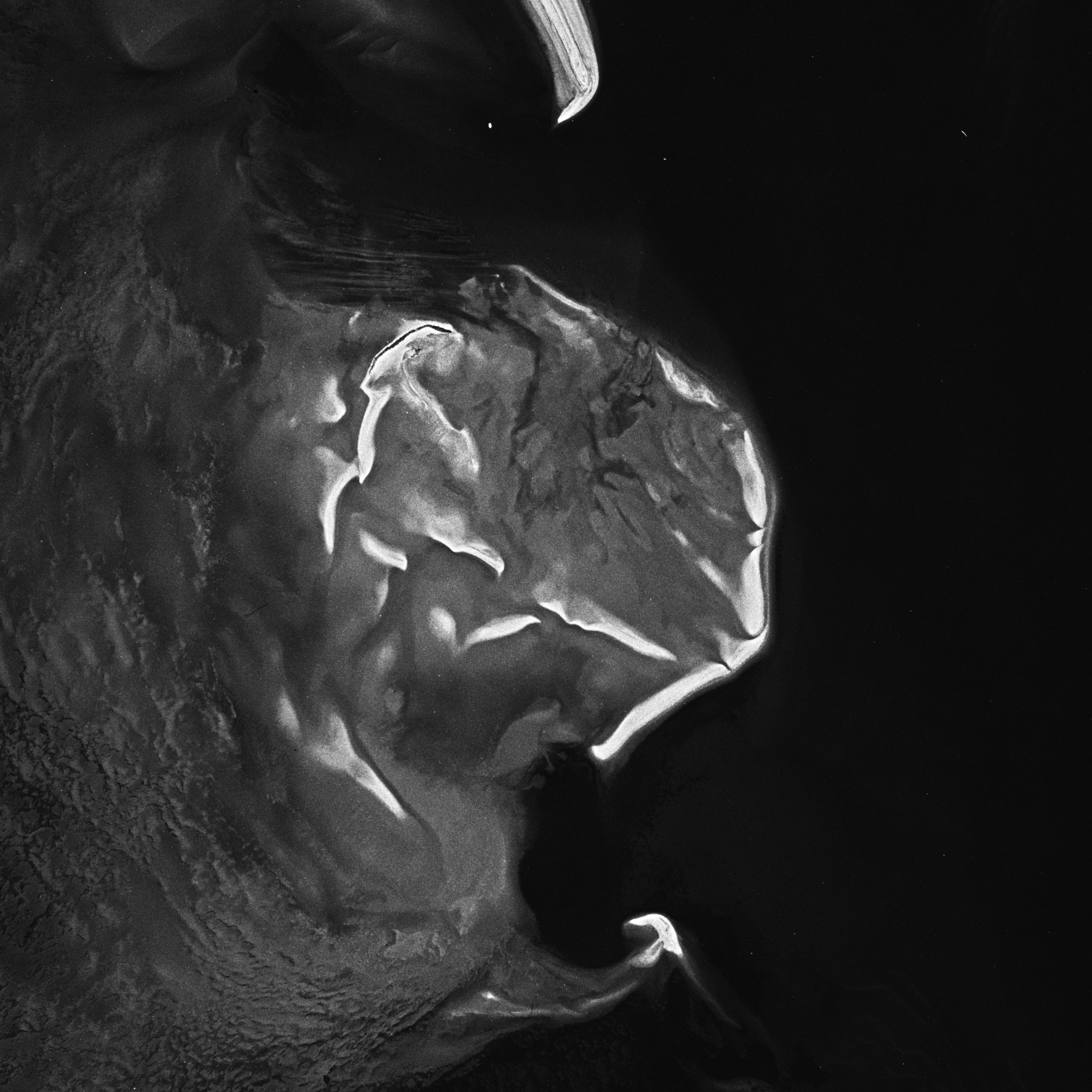
Billingsgate Island in 1974

Billingsgate Island, also sometimes known as Bellingsgate Island, was an island off Cape Cod in Massachusetts in the United States. Originally settled as a fishing and whaling community as part of the town of Eastham, Massachusetts, Billingsgate Island was for a long time the site of a lighthouse used as a navigational aid in Cape Cod Bay. Local historians sometimes call it the Atlantis of Cape Cod.

The area, which is just south of Great Island at the mouth of Wellfleet Harbor, is now known as Billingsgate Shoal and is visible from mainland Wellfleet at Jeremy Point at low tide. When exposed it is used as a picnic and shellfishing spot; access is by boat. The shoal is frequented by birds, seals, and anglers.

== History ==
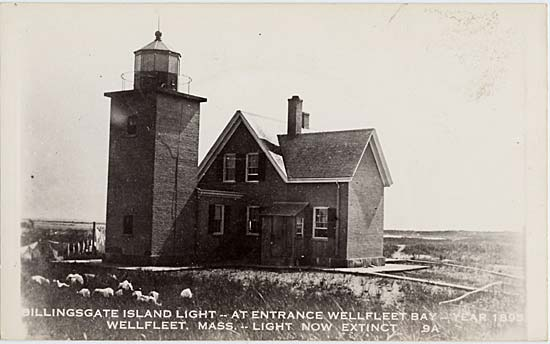
The Billingsgate Island lighthouse, 1895

Early European settlers found an abundance of fish in Wellfleet Harbor. They named the area around the harbor Billingsgate after the Billingsgate Fish Market in London. At that time (the 17th century), Billingsgate Island covered an area of 60 acres (240,000 m^{2}). Before that time it was a "point" or promontory, known as Billingsgate Point, attached to the northern landmass. This point was noted by the Mayflower settlers in Mourt's Relation. Before the end of the 18th century a ditch was dug between the point and the northern landmass and with the action of tidal erosion separated it into its own island.

The Punonakanit people, members of the Wampanoag Federation, lived in the area and coexisted peacefully with European settlers. Their population greatly reduced by smallpox, the Punonakanits seem to have died out in the 19th century.

At its height in the early 19th century there were over thirty homes on Billingsgate Island; later it even had its own baseball team. The first lighthouse was built in 1822. After an 1855 storm divided the island in half, a second lighthouse was built on higher ground in 1858. The new structure was made of brick with a granite foundation; the foundation stones and a scattering of bricks can still be found on the shoal.

The island continued to erode away with heavy flooding of the tower itself in 1873, 1875, and 1882. The lighthouse keeper died in the flooding of 1875. More than 1,000 feet (300 m) of sea wall was built in 1888 to protect the lighthouse, but erosion continued at a fast pace. Early in the 20th century the last families moved off Billingsgate, leaving only the lighthouse keeper and a man who guarded the shellfish beds. Many of the houses on the island were floated across the harbor to Wellfleet on rafts to prevent their loss. (Some are still standing and are known locally as Billingsgate cottages.) The 1858 lighthouse was abandoned in 1915 and destroyed by a storm in December of the same year. The last light tower was torn down in 1922.

By the late 1930s or early '40s the island had been torn apart by coastal erosion. What remains is a sand bar south of the end of Jeremy Point in Wellfleet, exposed only at low tide and littered with large granite blocks, a few bricks, and many shells. The lighthouse is shown on a historical navigation chart dated 1921, but is not shown on a chart dated 1933.

== In popular culture ==
- Figure Away (1937), a mystery by Phoebe Atwood Taylor, is set in the town of Billingsgate on Cape Cod in 1937. The author mentions the island "had for many years rested beneath the waves of Cape Cod Bay" in the disclaimer on the copyright page.
- In Billingsgate Shoal (1982), a suspense novel by Rick Boyer, a fishing boat runs aground at Billingsgate and a diver sent to investigate dies mysteriously. Billingsgate Shoal is the first book in Boyer's Doc Adams series; it won an Edgar Award in 1983.
- A number of historical characters in the novel Cape Cod (1991) by William Martin lived on Billingsgate during the 17th, 18th and 19th centuries.
- The Disappearing Island, a children's book by Corinne Demas, published in the year 2000, describes a visit to Billingsgate at low tide by a little girl and her grandmother.
