= Wildfire history of Cape Cod =

As of 2004 the wildfire potential of the forests of Cape Cod, located in southeastern Massachusetts, had been described as being the third most flammable area in the nation, behind southern California and the New Jersey Pine Barrens. With the development of the Cape from the 1960s to the present, the wildfire danger has diminished but thousands of acres are still capable of burning.

== History ==
=== Pre-European ===
Before Europeans settled the Cape, the forests were periodically burned by lightning strikes and the Wampanoag version of the prescribed burn. This kept the amount of underbrush to a minimum, thus allowing the Cape to experience few, if any, major wildfires. Excavations of charcoal, pollen and sediment from Mary Dunn Pond, in Barnstable show that the Wampanoag practiced periodic burns. The area around the Indian Ponds of Barnstable, including Mystic Lake, Middle Pond, and Hamblin Pond used to be burned by natives who would then subsequently use the land in small plots to farm.

=== Colonization ===
In the 1620s, the Cape was forever altered by the settlement of Europeans. The settlers did not like periodic fires in their backyards, and they put out any fire before it could really burn and do damage. This, and massive deforestation by the initial settlers, led to a large amount of brush accumulating in the surviving woods of the Cape. Unfortunately for the settlers, this caused fires, when they occurred, to really burn and explode instead of burning along the ground. The forests of this time were small and spread out so there was not much potential for disaster, but that changed after industrialization.

=== Industrial Age ===
The discovery of the New World led to newfound industries to many Europeans. One was shipbuilding. This was important on the Cape because the tall trees which survived the mass deforestation of the initial settlement, led to the major expansion of the shipbuilding industry. This, along with the decreased farming of the land, created an opportunity for pitch pine and scrub oak to grow in abundance. This land was divided up into individual firewood plots. Some of this wood was bought up by the Boston and Sandwich Glass Company, which operated from 1825 to 1888 and the Barnstable Brick Company, which operated from 1878 to 1929. Unfortunately, this led to many fires burning many acres because the forests began to connect.

The most destructive recorded event of this period was the 1887 Cape Cod wildfires. At least six distinct fires erupted on May 11, 1887, under abnormally warm and dry conditions, spreading across over 75,000 acres over three days and threatening the towns of Bourne and Falmouth.

=== Modern era ===
In the early 1900s, the Cape started to become part of the state's fire lookout tower network. Towers were constructed in many towns to make it easier to coordinate firefighting. Massive burns occurred in the forests, larger than any seen since pre-colonial times. This was especially true on the Upper Cape, where the forests had matured more than the rest of Cape Cod.

Modern techniques for fighting these fires include controlled burns and the clearing of brush. The discontinuation of live firing at the Massachusetts Military Reservation has also contributed to the decrease in the intensity of the fires. The military has helped with the hazard by periodically burning portions of the land to prevent these massive fires.

According to a study published in 2003, the Cape has a fire that burns on the hundreds to thousands of acres size every 30 to 50 years. Camp Edwards was excluded from this research because it burns more with the munitions on the base.

== See also ==
- Changes in the Land: Indians, Colonists, and the Ecology of New England
