= Stage Harbor Light =

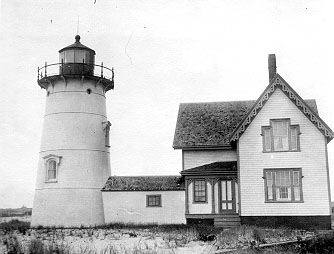
- Location: Chatham, Chatham, United States
- Coordinates: 41°39′31″N 69°59′01″W

Tower
- Constructed: 1880
- Construction: cast iron (tower)
- Shape: conical
- Markings: White

Light
- Deactivated: 1933
- Lens: fourth order Fresnel lens
- Active light
- Constructed: 1933
- Shape: modular skeleton tower
- Focal height: 42 ft (13 m)
- Range: 7 nmi (13 km; 8.1 mi)
- Characteristic: Fl W 6s

Stage Harbor Light is a lighthouse in Chatham, Massachusetts built in 1880. It was discontinued in 1933, replaced by a skeleton tower 200 ft (60m) west which remains an active aid to navigation. The original light helped to mark a vessel staging area anchorage (hence the name Stage Harbor) in deep water south of Harding's Beach used during periods of low visibility (fog) by vessels waiting to round Monomoy Point and Pollock Rip Channel. The lighthouse also lined up perfectly with the Chatham Twin Lights, making an effective range for Chatham Roads, the deep water channel crossing Nantucket Sound (known as Vineyard Sound before 1920) from south of Bishop & Clerks Reef off Point Gammon at Hyannis to the staging area. The original light is now a private residence. It sits at the entrance of what is still a busy harbor, used primarily by Chatham-based fishing fleets, sailboats from the Stage Harbor and Monomoy yacht clubs, and private craft owners.
