= Nantucket Range Lights =

Nantucket Range Lights could refer to any of three sets of range lights on Nantucket:

- The Nantucket Beacon and the Brant Point Light in the 19th century
- The Nantucket Cliff Range Lights, 1830–1912
- The Nantucket Harbor Range Lights, 1908–present
