= Burnham-on-Sea Low Lighthouse =

Lighthouse in Somerset, England

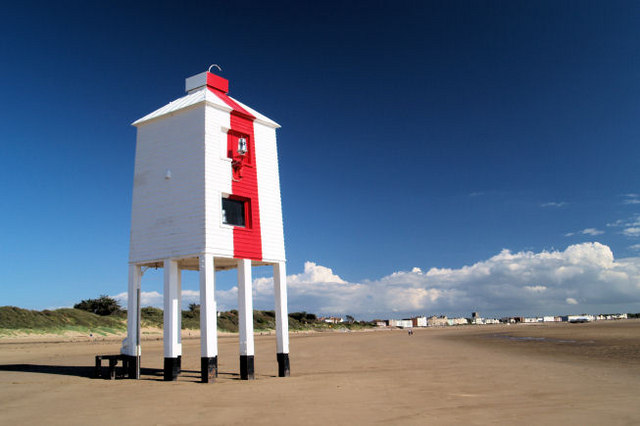
- Location: Burnham-on-Sea, Burnham-on-Sea and Highbridge, Somerset, United Kingdom
- OS grid: ST2989350400
- Coordinates: 51°14′54″N 3°00′21″W

Tower
- Constructed: 1832
- Construction: wood (tower)
- Height: 9 m (30 ft)
- Shape: square tower on nine pilings
- Markings: white tower with a red vertical stripe on seaward side and a black horizontal stripe on the shoreward side
- Operator: Somerset Council
- Heritage: Grade II listed building

Light
- Deactivated: 1969–1996

Main light
- Focal height: 7 m (23 ft) (white)
- Range: 12 nmi (22 km; 14 mi) (white)
- Characteristic: Fl W 7.5s

Directional light
- Focal height: 4 m (13 ft)
- Range: 10 nmi (19 km; 12 mi)
- Characteristic: F WRG

The Low Lighthouse is one of three historic lighthouses in Burnham-on-Sea, Somerset, England, and the only one of the three which is still active. It is a Grade II listed building and stands on the foreshore. First lit in 1832, the Low Lighthouse operated in conjunction with the (onshore) High Lighthouse for 137 years. Then, in 1969 (after improvements had been made to the High Lighthouse) the Low Lighthouse was deactivated; but later, in 1993, the Low Lighthouse was re-established and the High Lighthouse was instead decommissioned).

The Low Lighthouse has long been known as 'the Lighthouse on Legs', as evident in an 1859 guide book: "the writer has heard merry children, while sporting on the sands, call this smaller beacon, the lighthouse on legs".

== Location ==
Burnham-on-Sea is notable for its beach and mudflats, which are characteristic of Bridgwater Bay and the rest of the Bristol Channel where the tide can recede for over 1.5 miles (2.4 km). Burnham is close to the estuary of the River Parrett where it flows into the Bristol Channel, which has the second highest tidal range in the world of 15 metres (49 ft), second only to Bay of Fundy in Eastern Canada. The constantly shifting sands have always been a significant risk to shipping in the area.

== History ==
The low wooden pile lighthouse is 36 feet (11 m) high, the light being at 23 feet (7.0 m). It was built by Joseph Nelson in 1832, in conjunction with the High Lighthouse, to replace the original Round Tower Lighthouse (which itself had been built to replace the light kept burning in the tower of St Andrews Church to guide fishing boats into the harbour). The new High and Low lighthouses were first lit on 1 December 1832.

The Low Lighthouse was painted white with, on the seaward side, a black vertical stripe, one third the width of the building; the High Lighthouse was plain white. In 1890, to make the lighthouses more conspicuous by day, the colour of the stripe on the Low Lighthouse was altered to red, and a similar red vertical stripe was added to the High Lighthouse. Operation of the Low light was overseen by the keepers based and accommodated at the High Lighthouse.

=== Early operation ===
The Low Lighthouse showed a narrow fixed beam of white light from the lightroom on the upper floor, through a 2 ft 6 in (0.76 m) square window on the west side of the structure. Together, the High and Low Lighthouses functioned as leading lights, guiding vessels into the entrance channel for the River Parrett (the narrow entrance channel to the river lay between extensive mud flats: Berrow Flats to the north, Stert Flats to the south). The Low light had a range of 12 nmi (22 km; 14 mi), and beyond the narrow entrance channel the leading lights served in addition to provide a safe line of approach for vessels navigating up the Bristol Channel from the direction of Hurlstone Point and Minehead.

In April 1844, Trinity House issued a notice warning that the Gore Sand (at the southernmost tip of Berrow Flats) had extended itself in a southerly direction to such an extent that the two lighthouses in line no longer indicated the deep water channel between the mud flats. From 1 November 1866, the Low light was provided with an additional red light which shone a narrow beam in the direction of Gore Sand; at the same time, another red light was added (shining upriver from a window on the south side) to help guide vessels leaving the River Parrett.

=== Automation ===
When electricity was brought to Burnham in 1927 a 1000-watt incandescent light bulb was installed in each lighthouse (replacing the paraffin vapour burners then in use) which rendered the keepers redundant. A submarine cable was laid between the two lighthouses and the characteristics of the two lights were synchronised (being controlled by a 'motor driven character machine' installed in the High lighthouse, which controlled both light circuits together). Both lights were given an occulting characteristic, the Low light occulting every 2.5 seconds, the High light every 5 seconds. In each location the lamp was set within a sectional fixed optic, backed by a dioptric mirror. An automatic lamp changer was provided: in the event of a lamp failure the spare bulb was brought into operation and if it also failed an acetylene lamp would be automatically lit. Following automation, the Low light had a range of 9 nmi (17 km; 10 mi), the High light 15 nmi (28 km; 17 mi). The Low light retained its red sectors.

=== Decommissioning and recommissioning ===
From 1969, in addition to the main light, a subsidiary sector light was shone from a lower window in the High Lighthouse to indicate the correct bearing for the deep-water channel. This rendered the Low lighthouse surplus to requirements and it was deactivated that same year. On 31 December 1993, however, the High lighthouse was itself, in turn, deactivated; its flashing white light and subsidiary sector light were both transferred to the Low lighthouse, which was thereby brought back into commission.

Today, the Low Lighthouse has a focal plane of 7 metres (23 ft) and provides a white flash every 7.5s, plus a fixed directional light (white, red, or green depending on direction) at a focal plane of 4 m (13 ft). It is operated by Somerset Council.

=== In popular culture ===
The lighthouse has become a favoured spot for photographers. It also features on the back cover of the Weird Guide Britain.

== See also ==
- List of lighthouses in England
