= Burnham-on-Sea High Lighthouse =

Lighthouse in Somerset, England

Burnham-on-Sea High lighthouse Pillar lighthouse
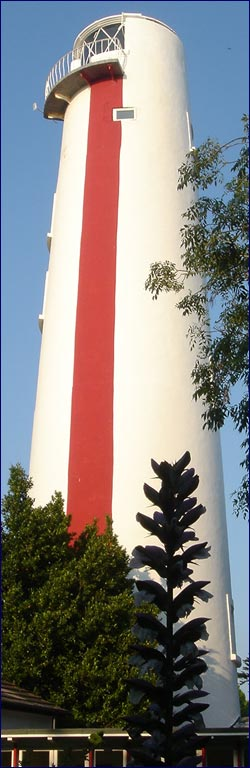
- Burnham-on-Sea High Lighthouse
- Location: Burnham-on-Sea; Somerset; England
- OS grid: ST3036750445
- Coordinates: 51.248927°N 2.999078°W

Tower
- Constructed: 1832
- Construction: brick tower
- Height: 30 metres (98 ft)
- Shape: tapered cylindrical tower with half balcony
- Markings: white tower with a red vertical stripe on sea side
- Operator: private
- Heritage: Grade II listed building

Light
- Deactivated: 1996

The High lighthouse or pillar lighthouse is one of three lighthouses in Burnham-on-Sea, Somerset, England. A Grade II listed building, it is no longer functional as a lighthouse and has been converted for use as a private dwelling.

== Location ==
Burnham-on-Sea is notable for its beach and mudflats, which are characteristic of Bridgwater Bay and the rest of the Bristol Channel where the tide can recede for over 1.5 miles (2.4 km). Burnham is close to the estuary of the River Parrett where it flows into the Bristol Channel, which has the second highest tidal range in the world of 15 metres (49 ft), second only to the Bay of Fundy in Eastern Canada. The constantly shifting sands have always been a significant risk to shipping in the area.

== History ==
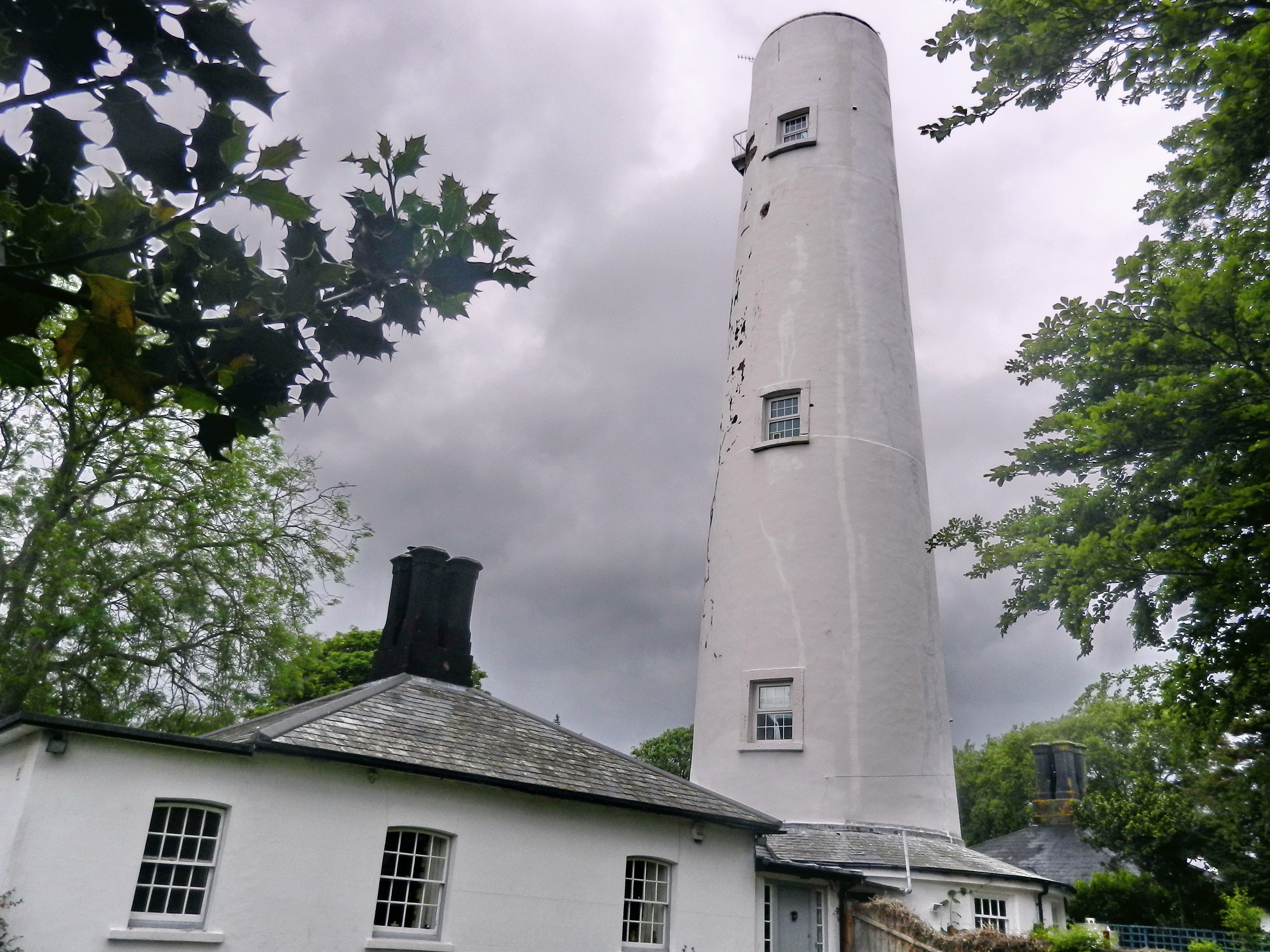
Rear view of the lighthouse and former keepers' cottages.

The 30-metre (98 ft) pillar or High Lighthouse was designed and built by Joseph Nelson for Trinity House, and was first lit on 1 December 1832. It was equipped with four oil lamps, which shone through a window set behind a half-gallery on the uppermost storey (at a focal height of 91 ft (28 m) above mean high water springs). The High lighthouse was designed to be used in conjunction with a new Low lighthouse, which was commissioned on the same date (and is still operating as of 2020). These new lights replaced the original Round Tower Lighthouse (which itself had been built to replace the light kept burning in the tower of St Andrews Church to guide fishing boats into the harbour); it was decommissioned on the same day that the new lights were brought into service.

The ground floor of the High lighthouse was 5 metres (16 ft) in diameter and the top room 3 metres (9.8 ft). Cottages at the base of the tower provided accommodation for the keepers who attended the two lights. The High Lighthouse was painted plain white, initially, and the Low Lighthouse was white with a black vertical stripe on the seaward side. In 1890, in order to make the lighthouses more conspicuous by day, a red vertical stripe was added to the High Lighthouse and the colour of the stripe on the Low Lighthouse was altered, likewise, to red.

=== Early operation ===
Burnham High and Burnham Low initially functioned as leading lights for vessels entering the River Parrett. In 1839, the lighthouses in line were described as indicating the way through a narrow entrance channel to the river, which lay between extensive mud flats: Berrow Flats to the north, Stert Flats to the south. As early as April 1844, however, Trinity House issued a notice warning that the Gore Sand (at the southernmost tip of Berrow Flats) had extended itself in a southerly direction to such an extent that the two lighthouses in line no longer indicated the deep water passage between the flats.

The High light was visible for 16 nautical miles (30 km; 18 mi), and was given an arc of visibility north of the line of transit, so as to provide a fix for vessels navigating between the Culver Sand and Steepholm (two hazards in the middle of the Bristol Channel). The Low light was visible for 12 nmi (22 km; 14 mi), and as such the two lights in line also served to provide a safe line of approach for vessels navigating up the Bristol Channel from the direction of Foreland Point and Minehead. South of this line the High light was 'masked'.

In contrast to the fixed light of the Low lighthouse, the High lighthouse displayed an 'intermittent' (i.e. occulting) light (being bright for three-and-a-half minutes, then obscured for thirty seconds). At the time, it was the only Trinity House lighthouse listed as having an intermittent (as opposed to either fixed or revolving) light, this new light characteristic having first been introduced at Scotland's Tarbat Ness Lighthouse in 1830. The means of providing the High light's intermittent character was described in 1861 as a clockwork mechanism which raised and lowered a shutter behind the light-room window so as to obscure the light for 30 seconds every four minutes. At the time the light source was four fixed Argand lamps, with 21-inch parabolic reflectors. The mechanism for eclipsing the light had been transferred to the High Light from the old lighthouse, which had latterly displayed a similar intermittent light.

In 1884 the High light was upgraded and its occulting characteristic was altered to two two-second eclipses every minute.

=== Automation and upgrade ===
When electricity was brought to Burnham in 1927 a 1000-watt incandescent light bulb was installed in each lighthouse (replacing the paraffin vapour burners then in use) which rendered the keepers redundant. (Burnham was the first Trinity House lighthouse in England to be converted from staffed to unstaffed automatic operation, following the automation of their lighthouses at Trwyn Du and St Tudwal's Island in Wales five years earlier.) A submarine cable was laid between the two lighthouses and the characteristics of the two lights were synchronised (being controlled by a 'motor driven character machine' installed in the High lighthouse, which controlled both light circuits together). Both lights were given an occulting characteristic, the Low light occulting every 2.5 seconds, the High light every 5 seconds. In each location the lamp was set within a sectional fixed optic, backed by a dioptric mirror. An automatic lamp changer was provided: in the event of a lamp failure the spare bulb was brought into operation and if it also failed an acetylene lamp would be automatically lit.

As of 2 December 1969, the characteristic of the High light was altered to one white flash every 7.5 seconds. At the same time, a subsidiary sector light was introduced, shown from a lower window in the same tower (focal height: 79 ft (24 m)) to indicate the correct bearing for the deep-water channel; it was a fixed light with red, white and green sectors. The new sector light rendered the Low lighthouse surplus to requirements and it was therefore deactivated on the same date.

=== Decommissioning and sale ===
On 31 December 1993, however, the Low lighthouse was brought back into commission (and given the same white flashing light and subsidiary sector light), meaning that the High lighthouse was, in turn, deactivated.

The following year, Burnham High Lighthouse was put up for sale by Trinity House. It was bought by a member of the Rothschild family, who owned it until 1996 when it was bought at auction by Patrick O'Hagan. Conversion for residential use included the removal of the 6th floor and the construction of stairs where there had previously only been ladders. In 2018, having once more been put up for sale, the lighthouse was bought 'by an anonymous buyer'. The Fresnel lens and prism panels which formerly made up the optic in the light-room remain preserved in the tower as a constituent part of its Grade II listing. The red stripe on the building is still used, in conjunction with that on the Low lighthouse, as a leading mark.

== See also ==
- List of lighthouses in England
