= Nantucket Cliff Range Lights =

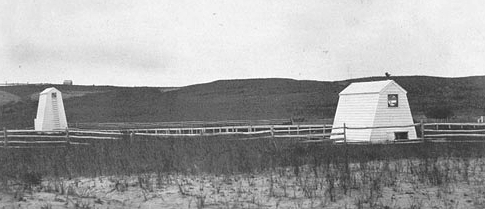
- Original installation from 1838
- Location: Nantucket, Nantucket County, United States
- Coordinates: 41°17′N 70°07′W

Tower
- Constructed: 1838
- Nantucket Cliff Front Range Light
- Construction: wood
- Markings: White
- First lit: 1838
- Deactivated: 1912
- Characteristic: F W
- Nantucket Cliff Rear Range Light
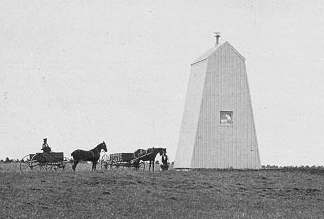
- Construction: wood
- Markings: White
- First lit: 1838
- Deactivated: 1912
- Characteristic: F W

The Nantucket Cliff Lights, also known as the Nantucket Cliff Range Lights were a set of range lights on Nantucket. Over the years, there were several sets of range lights to lead ships into Nantucket Harbor. The first were built in 1838. The second, a pair of conical white towers which still exist-owned by the Gilbreth family of "Cheaper by the Dozen" Fame-although not on the same site, were discontinued in 1912. The Gilbreth Family purchased the two latter range lights in 1921.

== See also ==
- Nantucket Harbor Range Lights
- Nantucket Beacon
- Brant Point Light
