= PEL sector light =

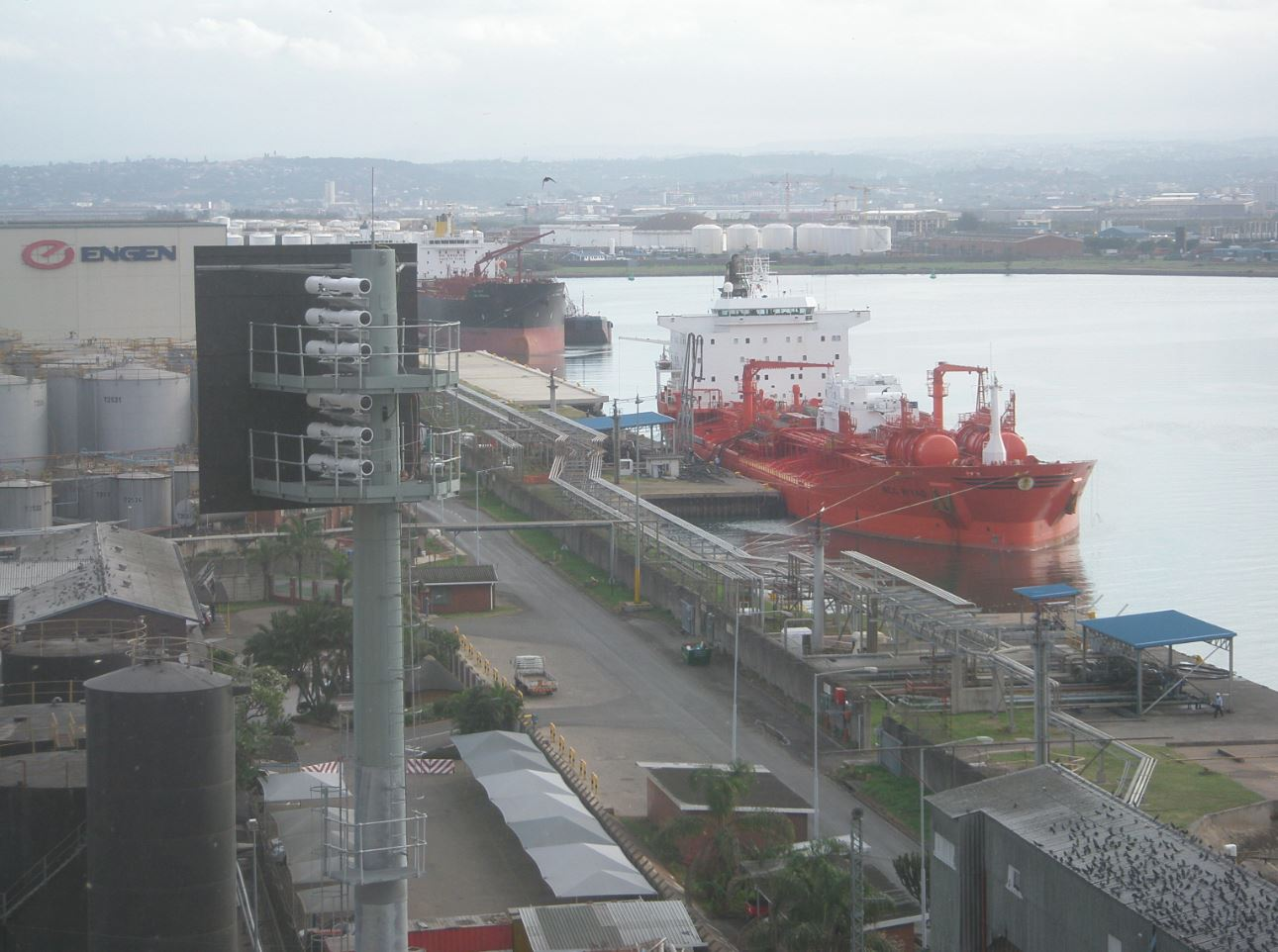
A large PEL sector light installation at the Port of Durban

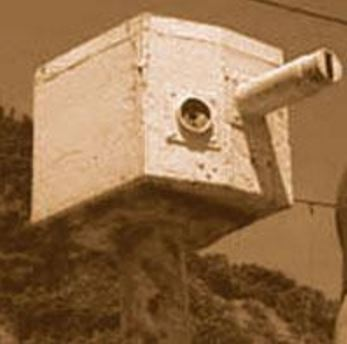
Original Porirua Harbour PEL

The PEL sector light is a projector style marine beacon which is used to guide maritime vessels. It does this by projecting a colored sector out to sea with very sharp color changes as the mariner transitions from one sector to the next. Typical PEL sector lights will have a complete color change over 1 meter (sideways movement) when the mariner is 5 km from the beacon. The PEL's application becomes relevant to the mariner when combined with a local marine chart as each application of a PEL varies greatly. They are used for guiding vessels into harbor, traffic separation or to illuminate hazards. The main advantage to a PEL sector light is that it has very sharp transitions between colors (typical 0.05°) and is bright enough to be used in daylight with up to 10 Nautical Miles or 18.5 km visibility.

== Origin ==
The term PEL is a generalized trademark of the Physics and Engineering Laboratory which was part of the Department of Scientific and Industrial Research (DSIR), a New Zealand public research facility. Vega Industries was established in 1972, to design the first PEL to safely navigate into the Paremata Harbour in New Zealand. When viewed from above the water, the entrance to Paremata Harbor appears wide however a semi submerged reef makes it very hazardous. Traditionally a 2 tower lead light system would be used for such an approach however this was not possible because of a cliff which made construction unsuitable for the front tower. Norman Rumsey, an optical designer and astronomer was head of the Physics and Engineering Laboratory (PEL) at the time and used his background in telescope design to create the PEL for the Paremata Harbor project. The solution was a weather proof projector sector light which used colored filters instead of slides to illuminate safe passage during the day. If the mariner could see white light, they knew they were approaching the harbor on the correct heading. If the mariner saw red light, they would need to change course immediately to avoid collision with the Tokaapapa Reef which is semi submerged at high tide. Consequentially of having their origins in the Physics and Engineering Department, projector style beacons are now called PELs although they are often marketed as Port Entry Lights.

== Modern PEL ==
PEL style beacons have been modernized today with advancements in LED technology. This has enabled them to be solar-powered and can be used at temporary locations or sites removed from the electrical grid.
