= Hospital Point Range Rear Light =

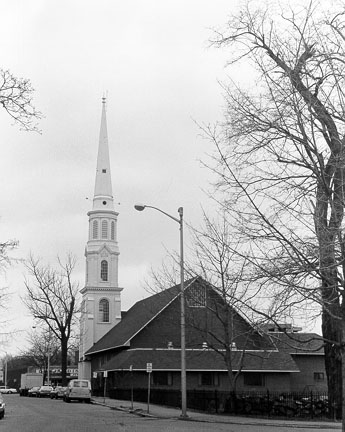
- Location: Beverly, Massachusetts
- Coordinates: 42°32′53.94″N 70°52′42.43″W

Tower
- Shape: church steeple
- Markings: White

Light
- First lit: 1927
- Focal height: 183 feet (56 m)
- Characteristic: Fl W

The Hospital Point Range Rear Light is part of a pair of range lights in Beverly, Massachusetts. It is located in the steeple of the First Baptist Church of Beverly.

== History ==
The Hospital Point Light was established to help guide ships through Salem Sound. It was originally established as a single light, but in 1927 the beacon from a lightship was used to create a range, with the existing light made the front light. This beacon was set in the steeple of the First Baptist Church, the tallest spire in town; it projects a very narrow beam, only 2° either side of the range course, leading across the northern part of the sound. The church was destroyed in a fire in 1975, but the steeple survived; it was incorporated into the rebuilt church. The light continues in active service.
