= Vlb-36 =

The Vega LED Beacon (VLB)-36 is a self contained Light Emitting Diode (LED) lantern suitable for use on both buoys and structures. The VLB-36 is utilized in situations where it is deemed economical to replace legacy signal and power hardware with a single lantern and a self-contained power system (i.e., solar panels, battery and light are a single unit). An example of an organization which has utilized this technology is The US Coast Guard. purchases and distributes VLB-36 LED red and green lanterns. The lantern is completely self-contained and has three solar panels, LED optic head and a lead-acid non-spill rechargeable battery. It is provided to meet the usual marine requirements in white, yellow, red and green. The cap above the lantern indicates the signal color.
