= Burnham-on-Sea Round Tower =

Lighthouse in Somerset, England

Burnham-on-Sea Round Tower Burnham Old
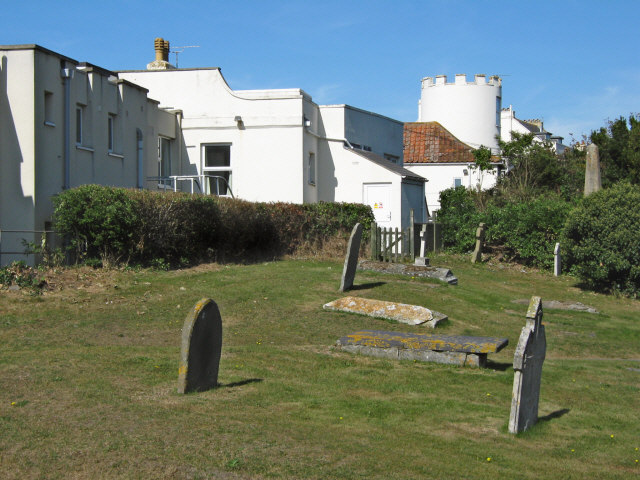
- Burnham-on-Sea Round Tower
- Location: Burnham-on-Sea; Somerset; England
- Coordinates: 51.239978°N 2.998627°W

Tower
- Constructed: 1801
- Construction: masonry tower
- Shape: cylindrical tower with battlement top
- Markings: white tower
- Operator: private

Light
- Deactivated: 1832

The Round Tower was a lighthouse in Burnham-on-Sea, Somerset, England, established in 1801. It was decommissioned in 1832, having been replaced by a pair of leading lights half a mile to the north, and is now a private dwelling.

== Location ==
Burnham-on-Sea is notable for its beach and mudflats, which are characteristic of Bridgwater Bay and the rest of the Bristol Channel where the tide can recede for over 1.5 miles (2.4 km). Burnham is close to the estuary of the River Parrett where it flows into the Bristol Channel, which has the second highest tidal range in the world of 15 metres (49 ft), second only to Bay of Fundy in Eastern Canada. The constantly shifting sands have always been a significant risk to shipping in the area.

== History ==
According to local legend, on a stormy night in around 1750 a fisherman's wife placed a candle in the window of her cottage, near the church, to guide her husband back home. Such was its effectiveness that local sailors began to pay her regular small sums of money to keep a candle burning night by night. Later, she was paid £5 by the sexton of St Andrews Church, who took over the responsibility but placed the light on top of the church tower where it was more easily to be seen. A local vicar, either John Goulden in 1764 or Walter Harris in 1799, raised a subscription amongst the local population to replace the light on the church.

Towards the end of the century, the curate The Revd David Davies paid the sexton £20 for the right to exhibit the light, having himself resolved to establish a purpose-built lighthouse; as a result, the Burnham (or Bridgwater) Lighthouse was built alongside the curate's house, and first lit in 1801. Funds towards the maintenance of the light were raised from local merchants and ship owners; however by 1813 these funds were proving insufficient, and Davies was given permission to levy dues to supplement the £135 annual income as this wasn't enough for the lights maintenance.

A 100 years lease had been attached to the permission to levy dues; however the outstanding 85 years of the lease was purchased by Trinity House around 1829. Funds from the sale were used by The Revd David Davies to improve the local area in an attempt to create a spa town, 'Daviesville', in the parish.

In 1831, the lighthouse was described as having a distinctive occulting characteristic as follows: "This light appears in full force like a star one minute and a half, and is then eclipsed half a minute. It is lighted throughout the night, and is seen at the distance of one or two leagues, according to the state of cloudiness or clearness of the atmosphere".

Trinity House soon resolved to replace the lighthouse with "a far more elegant, and much loftier structure, about half a mile northward of the former building, and which, from its greater altitude, as well as from there being no land intervenient to the point of view, must be perceptible at a far greater distance". At the same time, they planned to erect a second light on the foreshore, the two together being designed to function as leading lights. Trinity House continued to operate the old lighthouse until 1 December 1832, when it was decommissioned and the new High and Low lighthouses were lit. The machinery used to eclipse the light was transferred from the old lighthouse to the new High Light, which displayed a similar characteristic.

Later, the old tower was shortened to two storeys, to prevent any confusion with the new High Lighthouse, and battlements were added.

== Significance ==
In his 1836 guide to the new spa town, George Henning MD described the Round Tower lighthouse as having been "the great feature of the place, and the cynosure of the waters. It was the erection of this building that raised Burnham from obscurity. It drew strangers to the place, and those of quick perception saw intuitively, that it was a land of promise".

== See also ==
- List of lighthouses in England
