= Hospital Point Range Front Light =

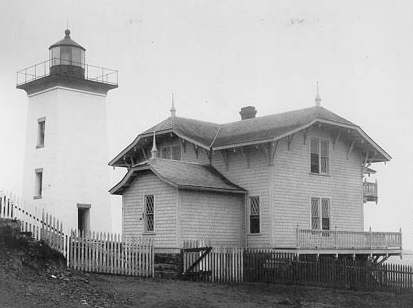
- US Coast Guard photo
- Location: Beverly, Massachusetts
- Coordinates: 42°32′47.4″N 70°51′21.4″W

Tower
- Constructed: 1871
- Foundation: Granite
- Construction: Brick
- Automated: 1947
- Height: 13.5 m (44 ft)
- Shape: Square pyramidal tower with attached house
- Markings: White, black lantern
- Heritage: National Register of Historic Places listed place

Light
- First lit: 1872
- Focal height: 70 feet (21 m)
- Lens: Third order Fresnel lens (current)
- Characteristic: F W
- Hospital Point Light Station
- U.S. National Register of Historic Places
- MPS: Lighthouses of Massachusetts TR
- NRHP reference No.: 87002031
- Added to NRHP: September 28, 1987

Hospital Point Range Front Light is a historic lighthouse at the end of Bayview Avenue in Beverly, Massachusetts. It forms the front half of a range which guides vessels toward Salem Harbor. The tower was added to the National Register of Historic Places as Hospital Point Light Station on September 28, 1987.

Established in 1871, the beacon marks the deep water channel to Beverly, Salem and Marblehead Two bronze plaques contain historical information about the site. One plaque honors Beverly men who manned a fort at the site during the Revolutionary War, and the second describes the lighthouse and a smallpox hospital that was previously located on the site. The lighthouse was first lit in 1872 and was automated in 1947. The Fresnel lens was replaced in 1976, and an acrylic optic was installed in 1981. At some point the original 3.5-order Fresnel Lens was returned to the lighthouse where it presently remains.

The square pyramidal light tower is 45 feet (14 m) tall, made of white painted brick and is topped with a 10-sided lantern. There are five sash windows in the tower, with the doorway facing the keeper's house. A small brick oil house stands nearby. The keeper's house is an example of Queen Anne style architecture, although its historic detailing are obscured by a major addition to the building in 1968.

Hospital Point Light is owned and operated as a navigation aid by the United States Coast Guard. The light is paired with a second light installed in the steeple of Beverly's First Baptist Church in 1927. Vessels are able to use the two lights to align themselves with the middle of the channel, avoiding the rocky shores.

Tours are offered to the public each August for Beverly Homecoming celebrations and include 40 winding stairs and a ladder to the top of the light.

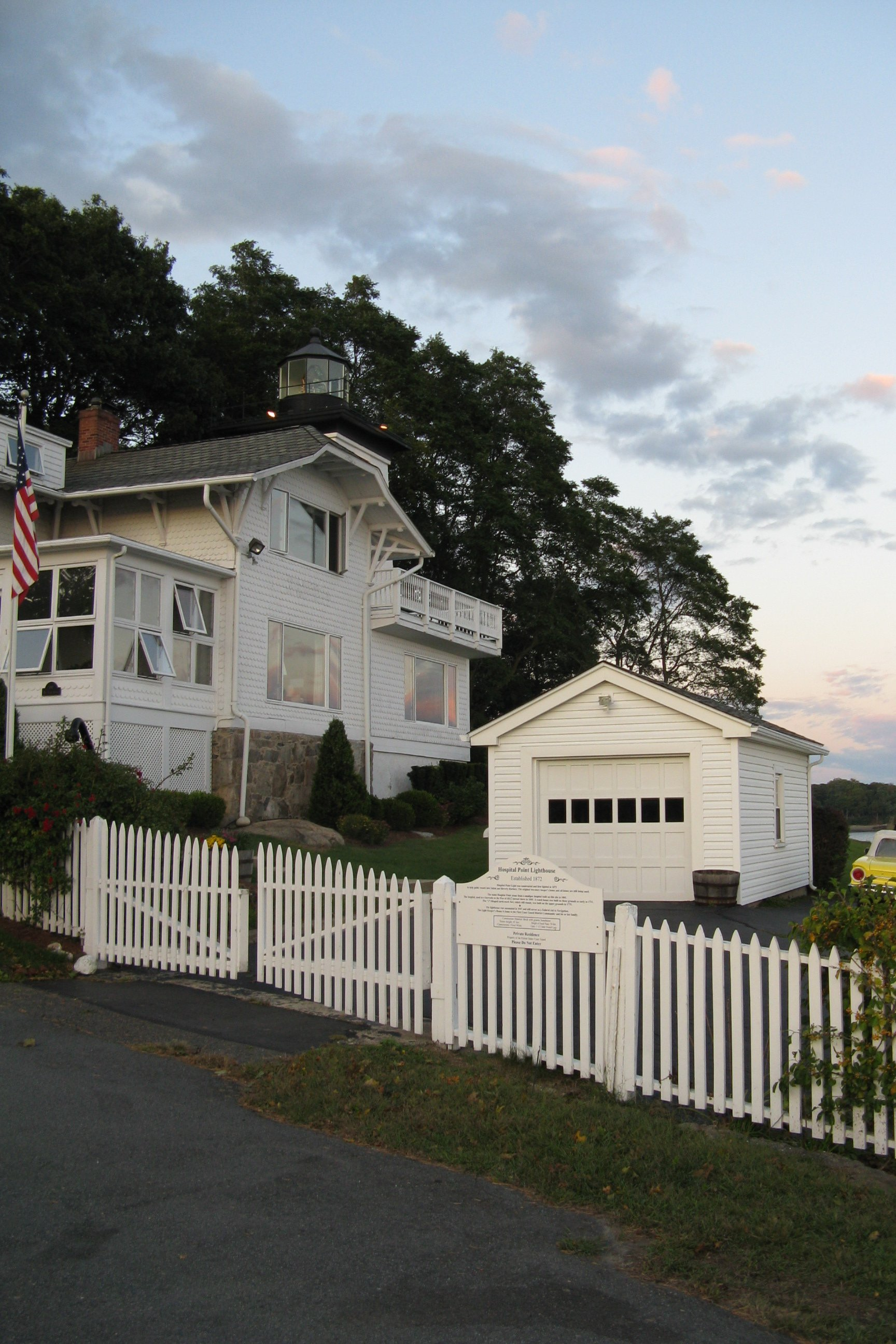
Hospital Point Light, February 2010

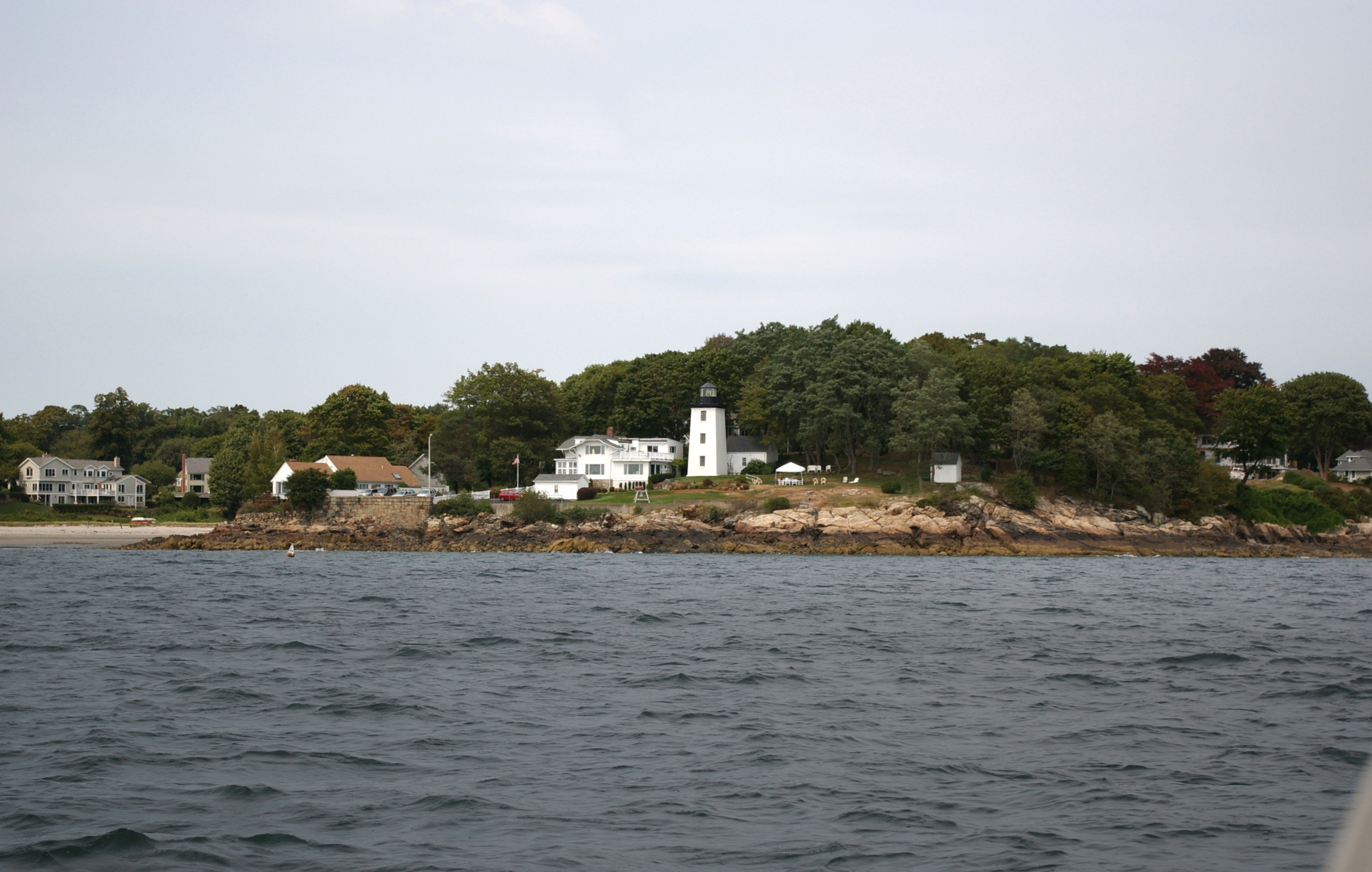
Hospital Point Light Station, Bayview Ave. Beverly

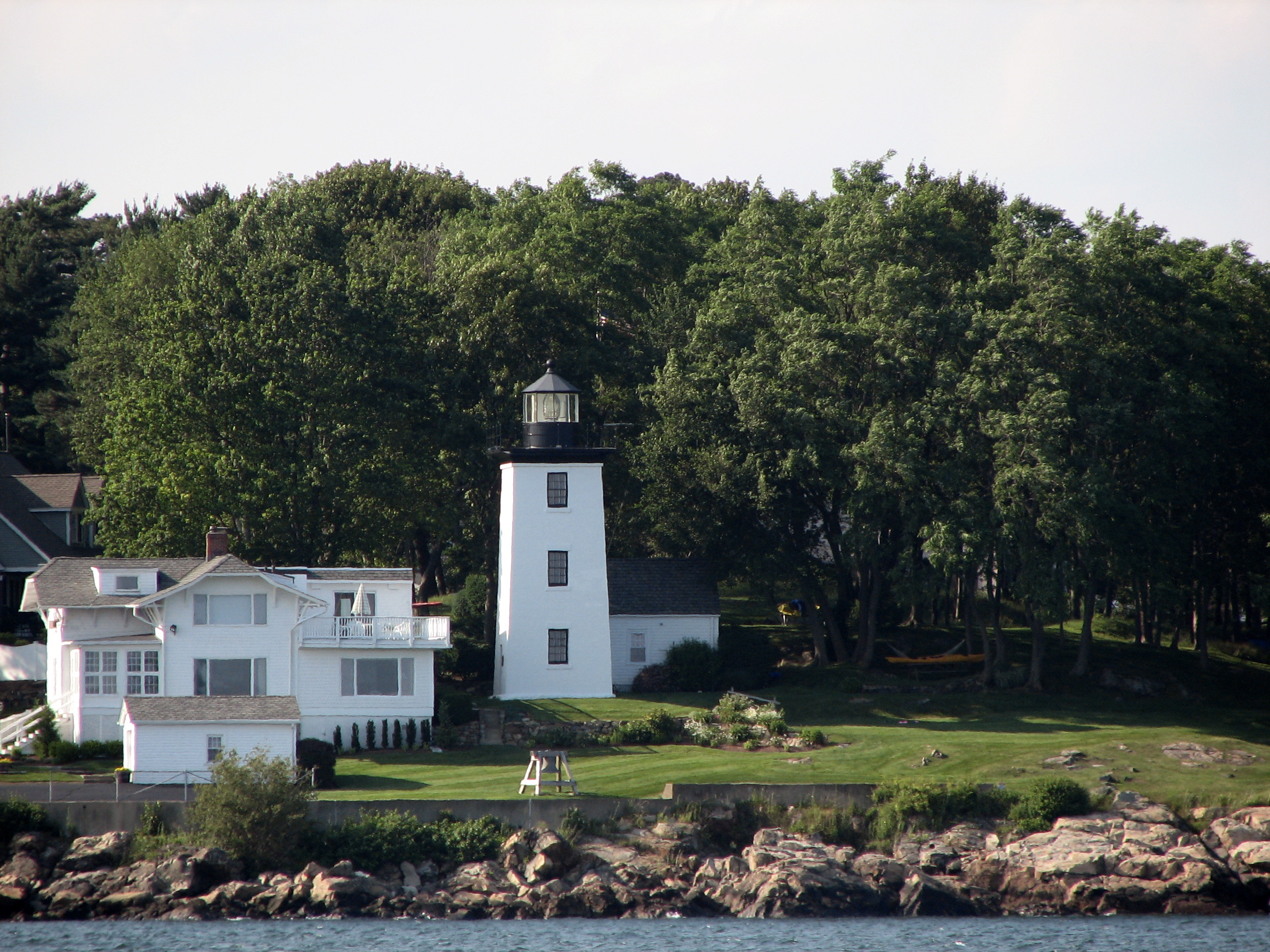
Hospital Point Light Station, Bayview Ave. Beverly

== See also ==
- Hospital Point Range Rear Light
- National Register of Historic Places listings in Essex County, Massachusetts
