= St Andrew's Church, Burnham-on-Sea =

Church in Somerset, England

Coordinates: 51.2396°N 2.9978°W

St. Andrew's Church
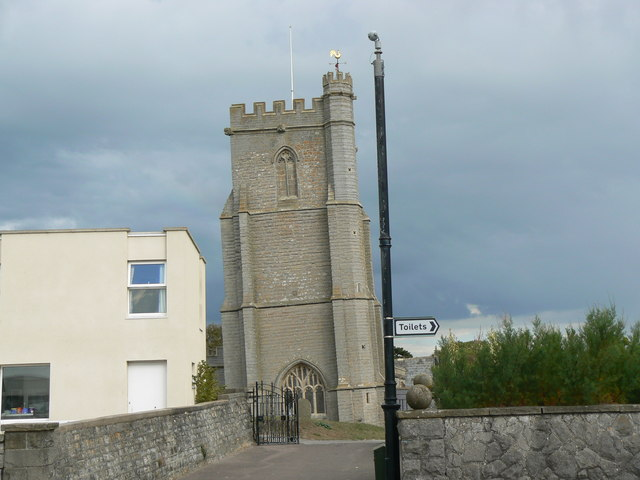

General information
- Location: Victoria Street, Burnham-on-Sea, Somerset TA8 1AW
- Country: England
- Construction started: 1305
- Completed: 1314
- St Andrew's Church; Burnham-on-Sea Seafront Range Rear
- Constructed: 1700s as light tower
- Construction: stone church tower
- Height: 11 m (36 ft)
- Shape: square parallelelpiped church tower with light
- Markings: unpainted tower
- Operator: St. Andrew's Church
- Heritage: Grade I listed building
- Focal height: 12 m (39 ft)
- Range: 3 nmi (5.6 km; 3.5 mi)
- Characteristic: F R

St Andrew's Church is the Church of England parish church of Burnham-on-Sea in the English county of Somerset. Of medieval origins, the church is a grade I listed building, well known for its leaning tower.

== History ==
There has been a church on this site since the late 11th century. Between 1305 and 1314 the original church was either replaced or enhanced; the parts of that church that still stand are the south transept, the south door arch, the holy water stoup and the consecration cross. The tower dates from the late 14th century, and the nave from the late 14th/early 15th century. The north aisle and gallery were added in 1838, and the chancel arch modified at this time. The chancel itself was remodelled in 1878.

== Leaning tower ==
The leaning tower, 78 feet (24 m) high, gets a lot of attention from tourists. Apparently if a plumb line is dropped from the north side of the tower it would fall 3 feet (0.91 m) away from the building. This major leaning is believed to be caused by the poor foundations.

During the 18th century a light was placed on the tower to guide fishing boats into the harbour. A local vicar, either John Goulden in 1764 or Walter Harris in 1799, raised a subscription amongst the local population to replace the light on the church. A four-storey round tower was built next to the church, being completed in 1801. This was taken over and improved by Trinity House, in 1829. Funds from the sale were used by the vicar, Rev David Davies, to improve the area in an attempt to create a spa town. Trinity House operated the lighthouse until 1832 when it became inactive and was replaced by the High and Low lighthouses. The round tower was later shortened to two storeys, to prevent any confusion with the High Lighthouse.

The tower holds a ring of eight bells hung for change ringing. The present ring contains bells cast at various dates by the Whitechapel Bell Foundry.

== Sculptures ==
A number of marble carvings designed by Sir Christopher Wren for the private chapel in the Palace of Whitehall can be now seen in the church. These sculptures formed part of an altar commissioned by James II in 1685, and were sculpted by Inigo Jones as part of wider work by Grinling Gibbons and his assistant Arnold Quellin, a Belgian artist of Antwerp. After having originally been taken to Westminster Abbey in 1706, where they were placed behind the High Altar, they were moved to Burnham in the late 18th or early 19th century when Walker King the Bishop of Rochester (also then vicar of Burnham-on-Sea), acquired them. King wrote a pamphlet about it which was sold to raise money for charity.

What one sees at Burnham is only part of the whole design; the main panels are behind the altar with the remainder of the fragments displayed at various places in the main body of the church. They first occupied the whole of the east wall behind the altar.

== See also ==
- List of ecclesiastical parishes in the Diocese of Bath and Wells
