= Brant Point Light =

1901 lighthouse
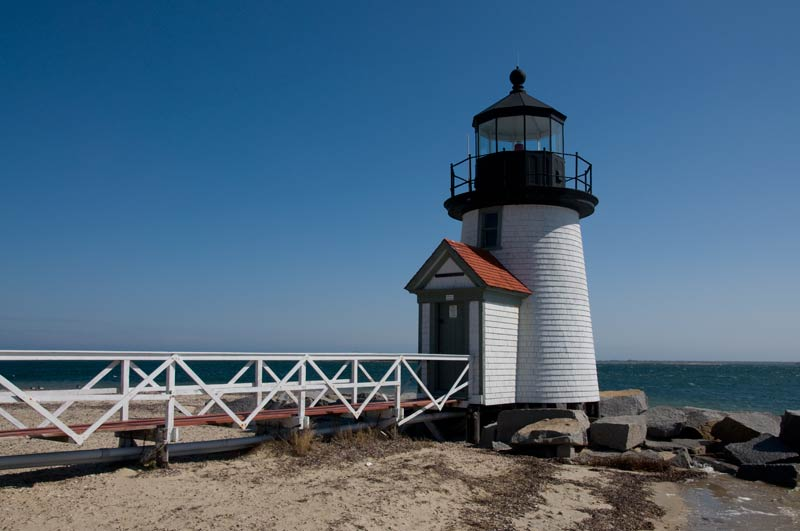
- Brant Point Light in 2009
- Location: Nantucket, United States
- Coordinates: 41°17′N 70°05′W

Tower
- Constructed: 1901
- Foundation: stone piling
- Construction: structural wood
- Automated: 1965
- Height: 26 ft (7.9 m)
- Shape: conical, footbridge to shore
- Markings: White (tower), black (lantern)
- Heritage: National Register of Historic Places listed place
- Fog signal: bell (original), horn: 1 every 10s (current)

Light
- Focal height: 26 ft (7.9 m)
- Lens: fifth order Fresnel lens
- Range: 10 nmi (19 km; 12 mi)
- Characteristic: Oc R 4s
- 1856 lighthouse
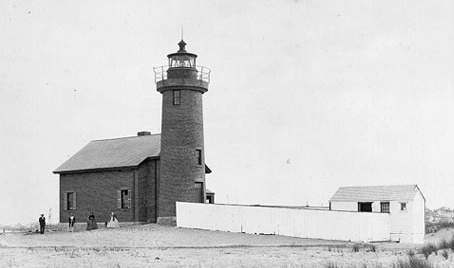
- The 1856 tower is still standing. (U.S.Coast Guard photo)
- Constructed: 1856
- Construction: concrete (foundation), granite (foundation), brick (tower)
- Shape: cylinder
- Deactivated: 1900
- Lens: fourth order Fresnel lens
- Brant Point Light Station
- U.S. National Register of Historic Places
- Area: 3.2 acres (1.3 ha)
- MPS: Lighthouses of Massachusetts TR
- NRHP reference No.: 87002029
- Added to NRHP: September 28, 1987

Brant Point Light is a lighthouse located on Nantucket Island. The station was established in 1746, automated in 1965, and is still in operation. The current tower was added to the National Register of Historic Places on October 28, 1987; it has the distinction of being the tenth light on the point, in addition to several range lights. Four of the others burned or blew down, two were condemned, two were unsatisfactory, and the remaining one stands unused.

== Chronology ==
- 1746: First wood tower, burned 1758
- 1759: Second wood tower, blown down March 9, 1774
- 1774: Third wood tower, burned 1783
- 1783: Lantern between two spars
- 1786: Fifth light, a frame with a place for lights at the top, wrecked 1788
- 1788-95: (date not certain) Sixth light, a tower, condemned 1825
- 1825: Tower framework on top of keeper's dwelling, rotten by 1853
- 1856: Brick tower, still standing, front light of Nantucket Range Lights
- 1900: A lantern at the extremity of Brant Point, about 600 feet (180 m) from the 1856 tower
- 1901: Wood tower, the tenth light and seventh tower replaced the 1900 lantern, still in use

== History ==
At a town meeting at Nantucket on January 24, 1746, the sea captains of the island spoke out for a lighthouse and the sum of 200 pounds was voted "in supposition that the owners of or others concerned in, shipping will maintain a light therein", but the town actually paid for its maintenance. The wood 1746 tower burned in 1758.

Town meeting authorized a new light, which was completed in 1759, which lasted until 1774. From the March 12, 1774, issue of The Massachusetts Gazette and the Boston PostBoy and Advertiser, "We hear from Nantucket that on Wednesday the 9th of March Instant (1774) at about 8 o’clock in the Morning, they had a most violent Gust of Wind that perhaps was ever known there, but it lasted only about a Minute. It seemed to come in a narrow Vein, and in its progress blew down. and totally destroyed the Light-House on that Island, besides several Shops, Barns, etc. Had the Gust continued fifteen Minutes it is thought it would not have left more than half the Buildings standing, in the Course that it passed. But we don’t hear of any Persons receiving much hurt, nor much Damage done, except the loss of the Light-House which in every respect is considerable."

Town meeting promptly agreed to rebuild the lighthouse for the third time "as High as the former one that blew down lately at the Town’s Expense." The town petitioned the Massachusetts General Court (the Legislature, not a court) for permission to levy tonnage dues, and, beginning August 1, 1774, it was ordered that any vessel over 15 short tons (14 t) was subject to a charge of 6 shillings the first time each year it entered or left Nantucket Harbor. In 1783, the lighthouse burned.

The first three lighthouses had been built with more of eye to economy than quality, but the fourth had no quality at all. It was simply a wood lantern with glass windows hoisted between two spars. This lamp was very dim and was often compared by mariners to a lightning bug; hence it received the name "bug light" and was replaced in 1786 by a slightly more elaborate structure, a frame, fitted at the top for lamps. This was wrecked in a heavy storm in 1788.

In August 1789, Congress voted to transfer the colonial lights to the Federal Government. Between then and 1795, another tower was erected on Brant Point. According to a "Memoranda of Cessions by Massachusetts," dated 1795, "The lighthouse on Brant Point with the tenements and land thereto belonging, owned by the State, was ceded to the United States in 1795."

This building, the sixth to be erected on this site, was also cheaply built and was condemned in 1825. A small tower framework, the seventh light, was built on top of the keeper's dwelling in 1825. This had eight lamps arranged in a double row, six in the lower series and two in the upper tier. Behind each of these lamps were 12’ 2-inch reflectors.

On November 9, 1853, C. A. Ogden, Major, Topographical Engineers, recommended to the Lighthouse Board that they build a tower for a second-class lens light which would cost $15,000. "The frame of the light tower at Brant Point is so completely rotted as to require reconstruction with the least possible delay," the letter continued, "and believing it to be the wise policy of the Board to make all its future construction permanent, I have asked the above amount for the tower. The dwelling house is much decayed, but has a nearly new roof and weather boarding on it, and may last for some years yet." A similar recommendation to the Board dated October 22, 1853, from Even W. Allen, Collector and Superintendent, District of Nantucket, reads in part "The whole establishment at Brant Point is very much out of repair, and from the age, material, and construction of the building, I should not consider it good economy to repair it; the interests of the Government and all concerned, seem to demand a more permanent and commodious structure." On August 3, 1854, Congress appropriated $15,000 "for rebuilding the lighthouse at Brandt’s Point, Nantucket, State of Massachusetts." The tower was described: "The foundation of the tower is of concrete cement 2 ft (0.61 m) thick, and 18 ft (5.5 m) in diameter. The base is of hammered granite, laid in courses two feet thick to the height of 12 ft (3.7 m). The interior of the base forms a cistern, where water may be caught for household purposes. The column forming the tower is of brick laid in cement, with an airspace within the walls for ventilation. The lamp is of cast iron, with 12 lights of plate glass. A circular iron stairway winds its spiral way up to a floor of iron, where rests the lantern, 58 ft (18 m) above the foundation and 47 ft (14 m) above the ground."

The fourth order Fresnel lens was first lit on December 10, 1856. The tower is still in place, with its lantern gone, on the grounds of the Coast Guard base. During its active period, it was the front light of a range formed with the Nantucket Beacon; this range was replaced by the Nantucket Harbor Range Lights.

In 1900, a fixed red light was installed at the extremity of Brant Point, 600 ft (180 m) from the 1856 tower, it having been found necessary to move the light outward, owing to changes in the channel. This was the ninth light to be located on the Brant Point site in addition to the Nantucket Harbor Range Lights.

In 1901, a new tower, the tenth light and seventh tower, was built at the extremity of the point, and the light exhibited there for the first time on January 31, 1901. There was originally a fog bell at the station. That tower, now fitted with a foghorn, is still in use.

In 1887, a dispute surfaced over the boundaries of the lighthouse site. This was settled in 1901 when five lots, totaling 5.9 acres (2.4 ha), containing three summer houses and part of a hotel, were sold by the Federal government as no longer needed for lighthouse purposes.

Mystic Seaport Light was built in 1966 as a replica of the 1901 Brant Point Light.

== Gallery ==
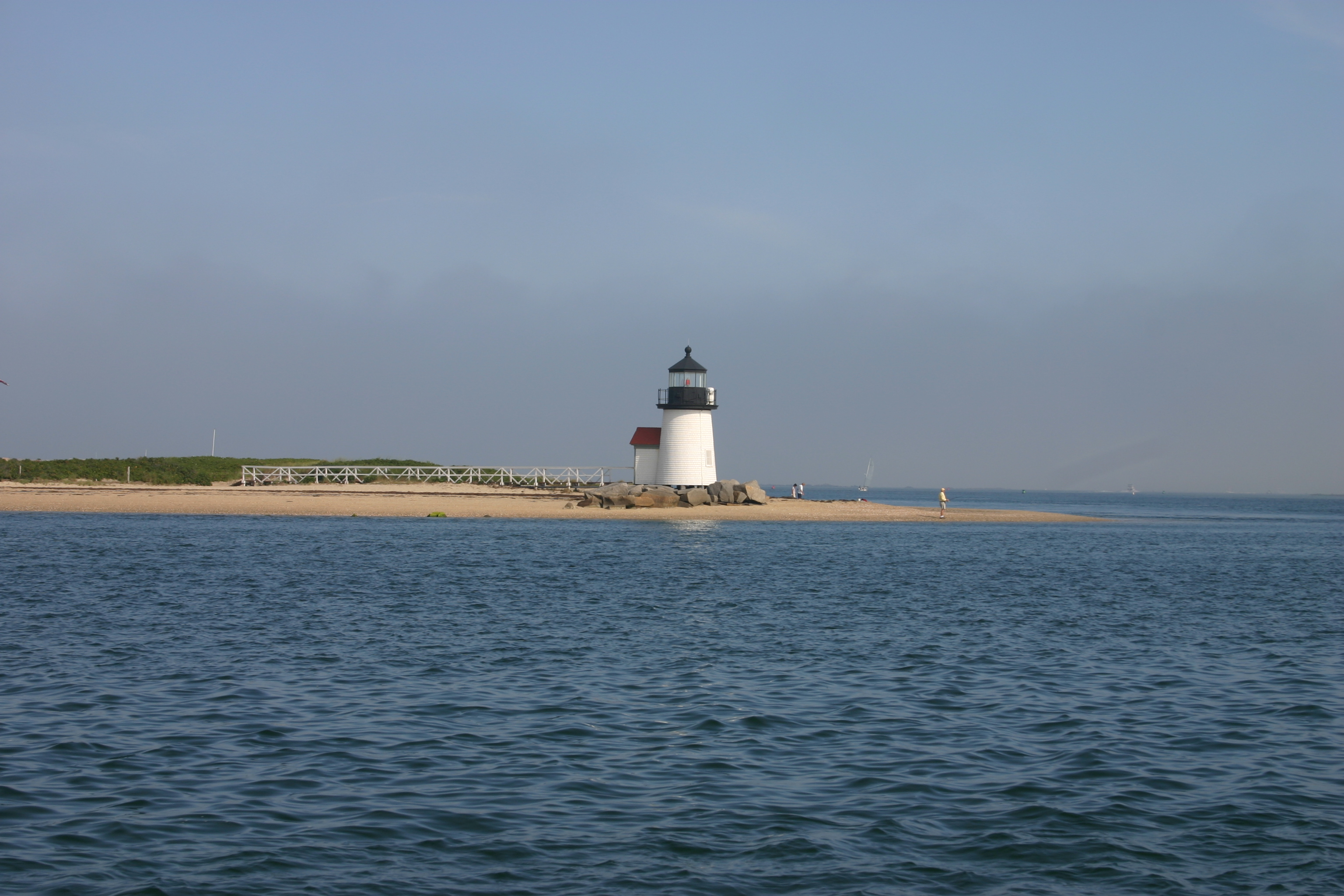
Lighthouse in 2006

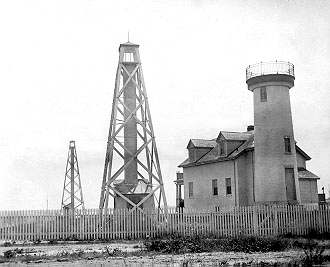
Nantucket Harbor Range Lights with 1856 Brant Point Tower to the right
U.S. Coast Guard photo

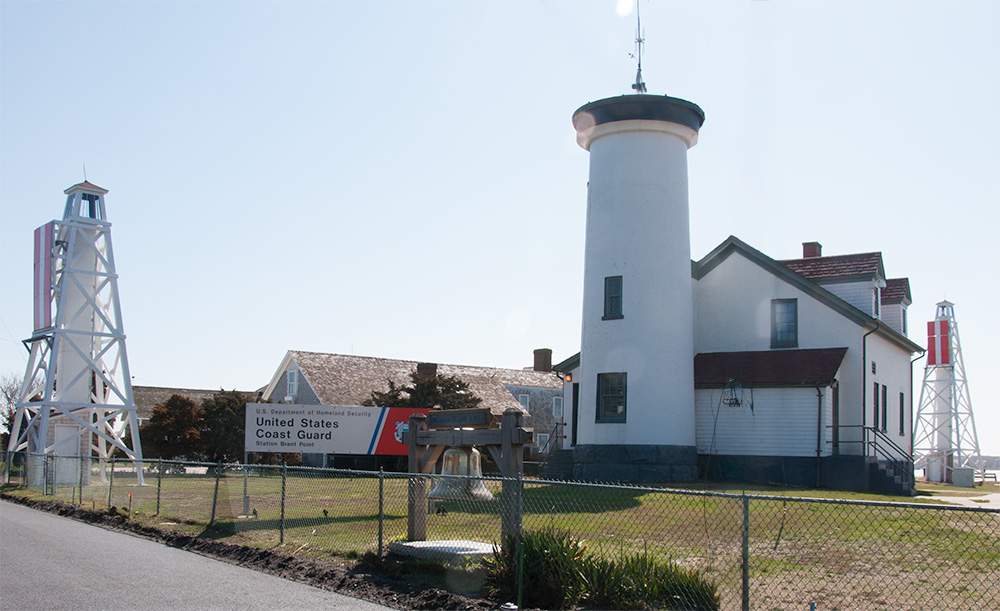
1856 Brant Point Tower, Nantucket, Massachusetts, USA

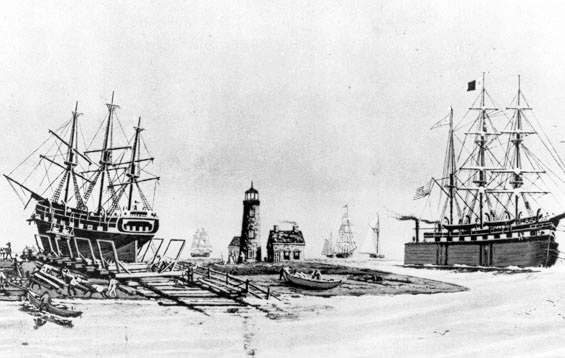
An early engraving of the light
U.S. Coast Guard

== See also ==
- National Register of Historic Places listings in Nantucket County, Massachusetts
