= Norman Rumsey =

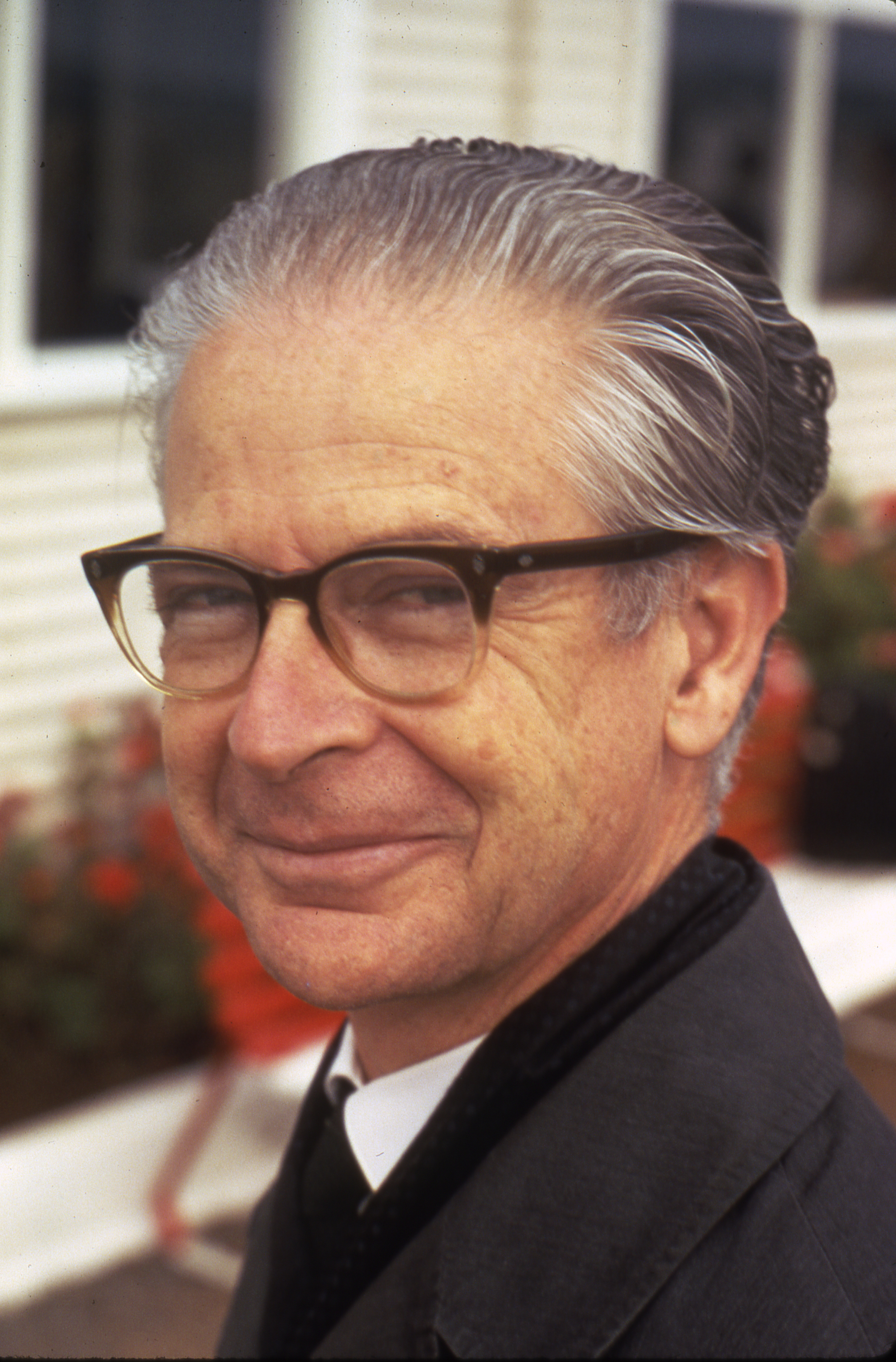
Norman Rumsey at the International Astronomical Union (IAU) Parkes trip, 1973

Norman Jack Rumsey ONZM (15 September 1922 – 9 January 2007) was a New Zealand designer of optical systems.

Rumsey was the head of the optics section of the Department of Scientific and Industrial Research (DSIR) from 1949 until his retirement. He developed the optical system for the McLellan telescope at the Mount John University Observatory near Lake Tekapo in the Mackenzie Basin. His design was the basis for a marine navigation system that was commercialised by Vega Industries in Porirua.

4154 Rumsey, a minor planet, is named for him. The citation reads:

Norman J. Rumsey is New Zealand's foremost optical designer. With Garry Nankivell, he has developed numerous optical systems for professional and amateur astronomers throughout the country. Rumsey's three-mirror designs were of particular interest.

In 1973, Rumsey was awarded the T. K. Sidey Medal, an award set up by the Royal Society of New Zealand for outstanding scientific research. In the 2004 Queen's Birthday Honours, he was appointed an Officer of the New Zealand Order of Merit, for services to optics and astronomy.

Rumsey was a member of the Astronomical Society of Australia and the International Astronomical Union. For many years, he was on the council of the Royal Astronomical Society of New Zealand, was elected a fellow in 1969, and served as its president in 1974/75. He was one of the people who established the Wellington Astronomical Society.

Rumsey died on 9 January 2007.
