= Vega Industries =

Vega Industries Limited is a company in Porirua, New Zealand, which manufactures specialised navigation and signal lights for use in transportation industries, primarily marine navigation. Vega has been in business since 1972 when it built a marine guidance system based on a design by Norman Rumsey.

Throughout the forty-plus years that Vega has been operating it has produced lights, which can be found all around the globe. From manufacturing the first LED lighthouse beacon (VRB-25) installed in the United States, to equipping Lake Balaton in Hungary with inland beacons (VLB-92). They have lighthouse and marine beacons installed in the United Kingdom and PEL Precision sector lights found in most major ports and harbours as well as remote locations like Alaska or the discreet US Naval Base Diego Garcia.

The most commonly used Vega navigation lights are the Vega LED Beacons of which the VLB-67 with several solar powered options and recently renamed as the VLB-5 to reflect the 5 nautical mile range is the most frequently installed.

Vega has representatives based in Sydney, Singapore, Munich and Houston.
