= Nantucket Beacon =

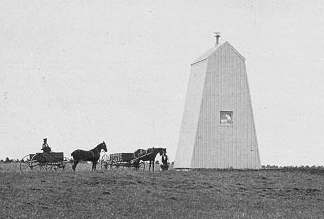
- USCG photo of beacon
- Location: On rising ground across the harbor, about one mile in rear of Brant Point Light
- Coordinates: 41°16′24″N 70°4′24″W location in 1858

Tower
- Constructed: 1794/1820?
- Foundation: Sills on wood posts
- Construction: Wood
- Shape: Pyramidal
- Markings: White
- Fog signal: none

Light
- First lit: 1856
- Deactivated: 1879?

The Nantucket Beacon formed a range with the Brant Point Light to guide vessels into Nantucket harbor. Operated at various times in the 19th century, it was deactivated sometime after 1870. This range was eventually succeeded by the Nantucket Harbor Range Lights, which are still in operation.

== History ==
There have been many lights at Brant Point, dating to well before the American Revolution. The history of range lights is a bit murky, and different sources give different dates. A researcher for the Coast Guard historical office dates a separate range beacon to 1794, but congressional records show this beacon established in 1820. Correspondence from 1838 describes the original beacon as an 11-foot (3.4 m) tall building with a two oil lanterns hung in it; in 1856 this was replaced with a pyramidal tower housing a 21-inch (53 cm) reflector lamp, as pictured. This structure was relocated many times, and in 1869 was positioned on Brant Point itself as the front light of the range; this proved unsatisfactory, and the light was moved back across the harbor the following year. Land was acquired around 1872 to relocate the light again and to provide for a keeper's house.

The date for removal of this light is unclear. An 1879 chart shows the beacon, and the following year's chart omits it; this is not a definitive indication, however, since no edition of the same chart prior to 1879 shows the beacon, even though other documents state it to have been operating. In the early 20th century new range lights were built on Brant Point, and the light itself was relocated to a new tower, obviating a separate rear range light.
