= Submarine cable =

Submarine cable is any electrical cable that is laid on the seabed, although the term is often extended to encompass cables laid on the bottom of large freshwater bodies of water.

Examples include:

- Submarine communications cable
- Submarine power cable
