= Nantucket Harbor Range Lights =

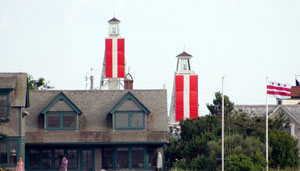
- Location: Nantucket, Massachusetts, Brant Point, United States
- Coordinates: 41°17′21″N 70°05′30″W

Light
- First lit: 1908
- Nantucket Range Rear Light
- Construction: lumber
- Height: 46 ft (14 m)
- Shape: Pyramidal Skeleton Tower
- Markings: KRW
- First lit: 1908
- Focal height: 51 ft (16 m)
- Lens: Higher intensity beam to seaward.
- Characteristic: F W
- Nantucket Reef Range Front Light
- Construction: lumber
- Height: 30 ft (9.1 m)
- Shape: Pyramidal Skeleton Tower
- Markings: KRW
- First lit: 1908
- Focal height: 35 ft (11 m)
- Lens: Higher intensity beam to seaward.
- Characteristic: Q W

The Nantucket Harbor Range Lights are range lights that were built in 1908 to guide vessels through the narrow channel to Nantucket Harbor. They replaced an older arrangement involving the Nantucket Beacon and the Brant Point Light, which became unusable when the latter was replaced with a new tower.

They display red and white vertical striped daymarks, type KRW, one of the twelve combinations used by the Coast Guard.

It is not known why the official USCG name of the front light, Nantucket Reef Range Front Light includes the word "reef".
