= Sector light =

Man-made pilotage and position fixing aid

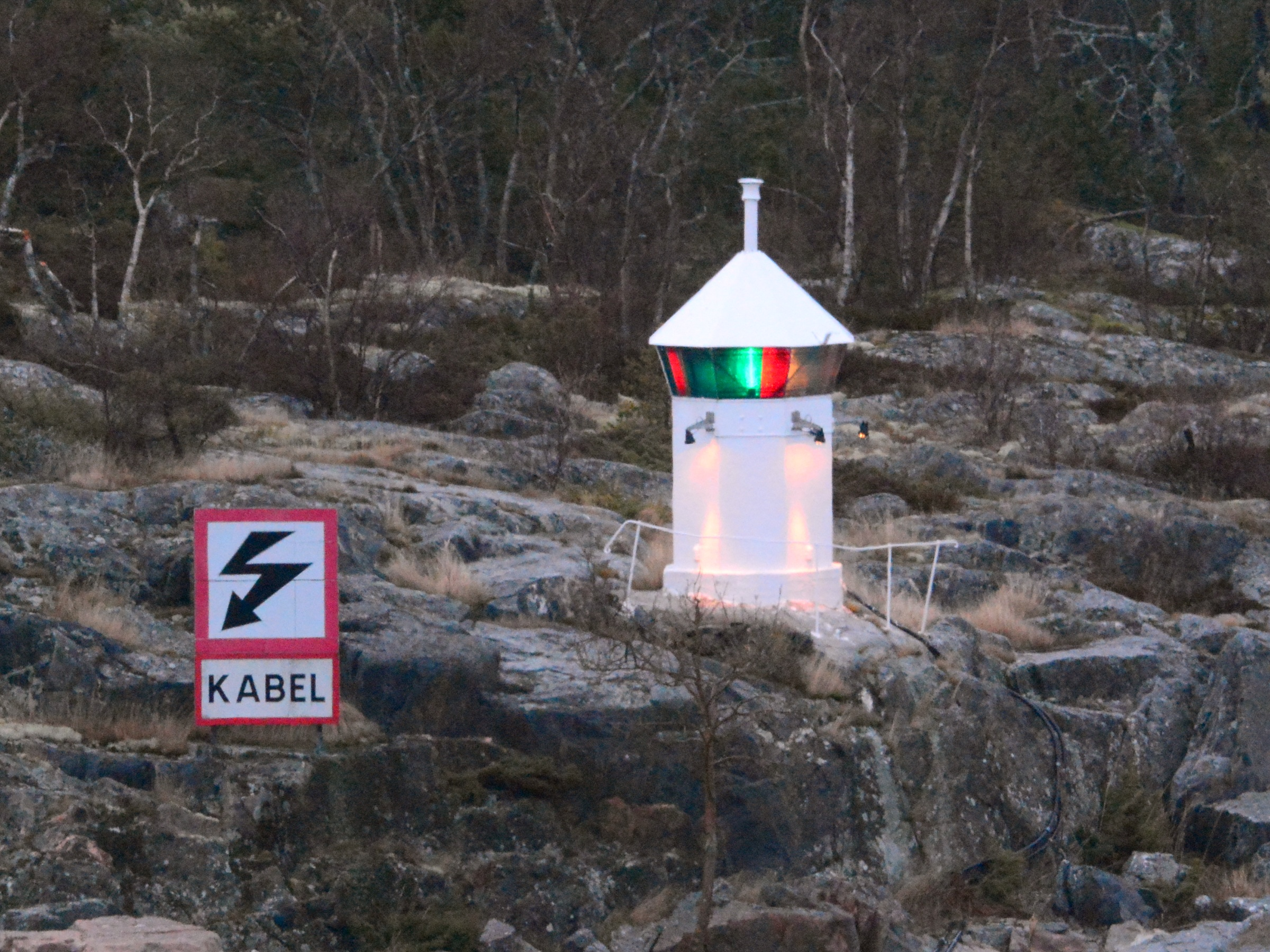
Sector light at Botveskär on the approach to Kapellskär, Sweden

Example of a sector light. The ship is navigating in the safe sector (white light is commonly marked as yellow in nautical charts).

A sector light is a man-made pilotage and position fixing aid that consists of strictly delineated horizontal angle light beams to guide water-borne traffic through a safe channel at night in reasonable visibility. Sector lights are most often used for safe passage through shallow or dangerous waters. This may be when leaving or entering harbour. Nautical charts (paper and electronic) give all the required information.

Sectors of colored glass (or plastic) are placed in the lanterns of these lights. The light will then show these colors when observed certain bearings. Bearings referring to a sector are given in degrees true, as observed from sea. Though the colors of the light will change, the characteristics will not. The change of color is not abrupt. The transition is made through an arc of uncertainty of 2° or greater.

The colors that are used, are conform to the IALA Maritime Buoyage system that is designed by the International Association of Lighthouse Authorities:

- white - this sector is in the middle of the safe channel
- red - indicates the port edge of the channel for vessels approaching the light source
- green - indicates the starboard edge of the channel for vessels approaching the light source.

A ship that is sailing in safe water and then sees the red (or green) color of the light has to make an alteration in course.

The world has different navigation standards managed by IALA (International Association of Lighthouse Authorities). For example, the United States uses a signalling standard which is the opposite of Europe. In USA, the red light indicates the starboard side of the channel for harbour bound vessels, while the green light indicates the port side of the same channel. An expression to remind of this is "red on right returning".

== Examples of sector lights ==
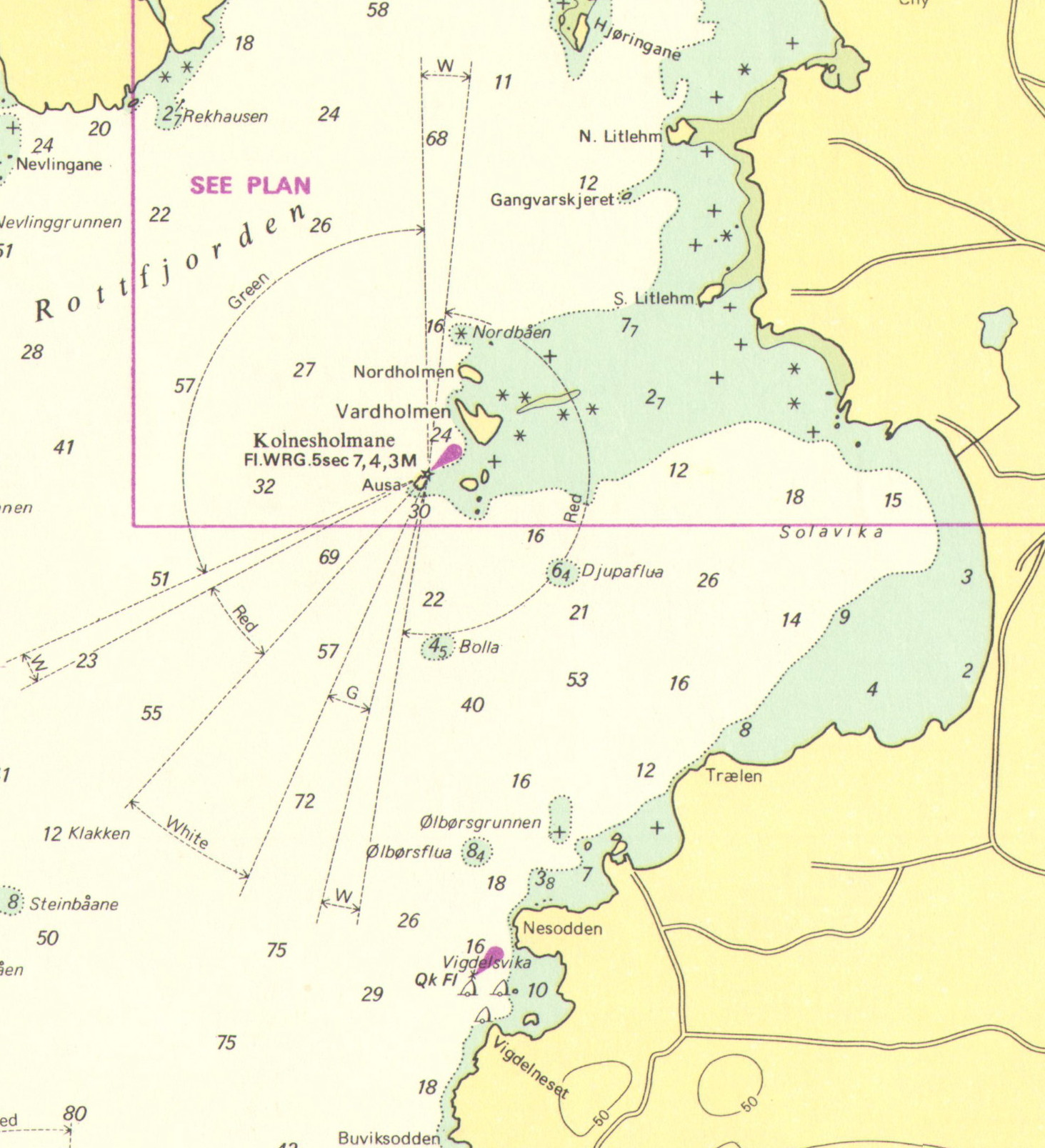
The sector light of Kolnesholmane as shown on a 1970 nautical chart

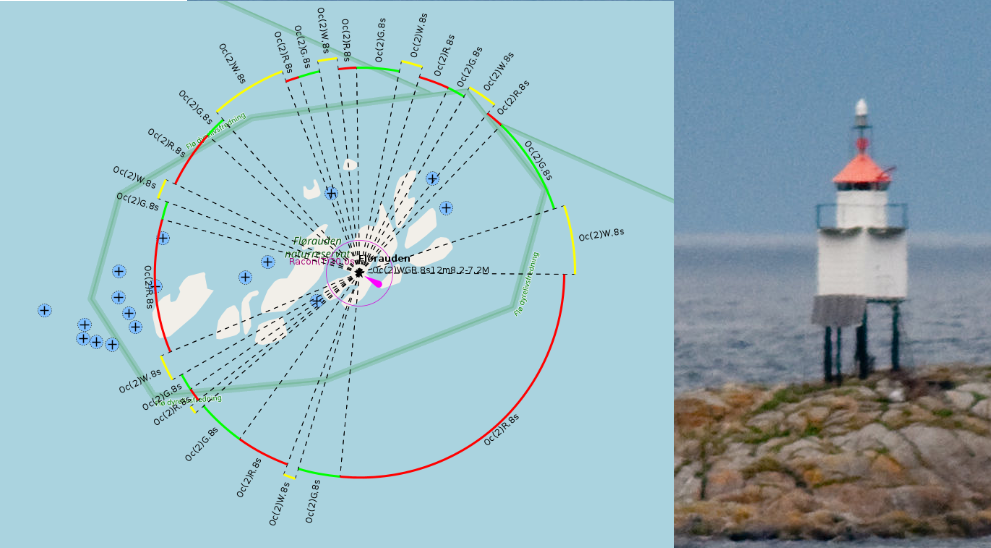
The sector light of Flørauden as shown on OpenSeaMap

An example of a sector light is the light of the Fisgard Lighthouse in British Columbia. The lighthouse was built to guide ships through the entrance of Esquimalt harbour. The white sector is an isophase light of 2 seconds from 322° to 195°. If the ship sees this white light, it can pass safely. The rest shows a red light from 195 to 322°. If a vessel sees this light, it should alter its course.

Another example is the PEL sector light at Diego Garcia. The PEL sector light was constructed to guide US Navy vessels into the Diego Garcia port through a narrow entrance in the lagoon. The PEL sector light produces 3.5 million candela and is visible for 10 nautical miles (19 km; 12 mi) by day. The beam with 3 colors is narrow at 1.6°. This was required because the PEL sector light was built over 7 nmi (13 km; 8.1 mi) from the atoll entrance and it had to illuminate a safe entrance which is only 228 meters (748 ft) wide.

A more complex example is Kolnesholmane, on the southern approach to Risavika in southwest Norway. This has multiple white green and red sectors, indicating safe passage from several directions.
