= Leading lights =

Navigational tool

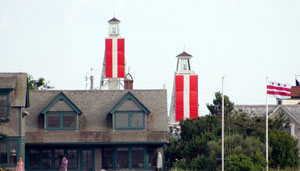
Nantucket Harbor Range Lights The dayboards are type KRW, see below.

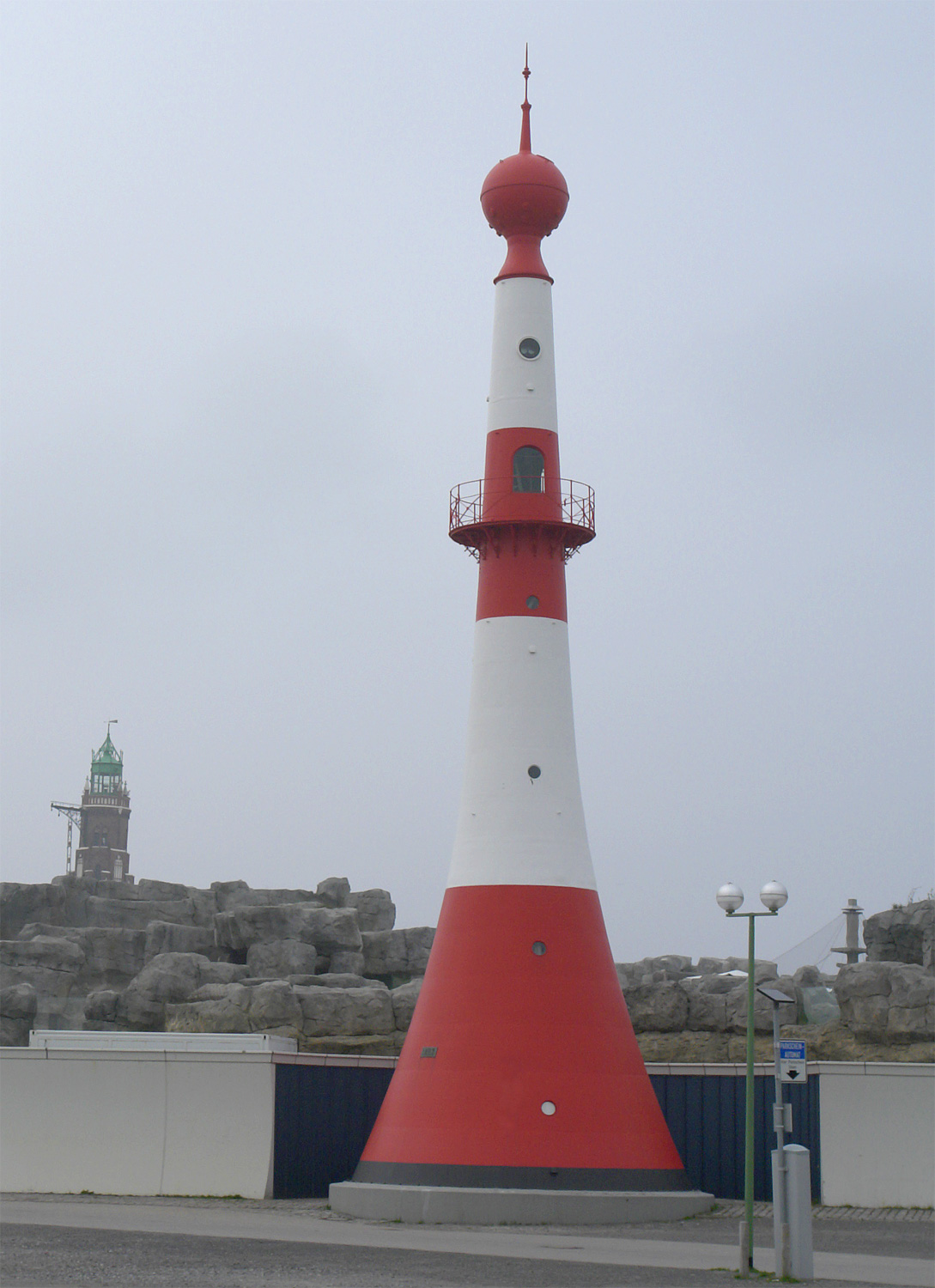
A pair of leading lights in Bremerhaven, Germany, with the rear light in a proper lighthouse and the front light on a smaller tower. No standardised markings are used here.

Leading lights, also known as range lights in the United States, are a pair of light beacons used in navigation to indicate a safe passage for vessels entering a shallow or dangerous channel; they may also be used for position fixing. At night, the lights are a form of leading line that can be used for safe navigation. The beacons consist of two lights that are separated in distance and elevation, so that when they are aligned, with one above the other, they provide a bearing. Range lights are often illuminated day and night.

In some cases the two beacons are unlighted, in which case they are known as a range in the United States or a transit in the UK. The beacons may be artificial or natural.

== Operation ==
Two lights are positioned near one another. One, called the front light, is lower than the one behind, which is called the rear light. At night when viewed from a ship, the two lights only become aligned vertically when a vessel is positioned on the correct bearing.

During the day, the lights may not easily be seen and therefore leading lights are often fitted with secondary visual aids, e.g. large red flags with wide black lines running down them. When both red flags and black lines line up, the navigator knows that the vessel is on the correct bearing. The structures are usually painted to make them more prominent.

Some major rivers, such as the Elbe River in Germany, have a series of leading lines. When it is necessary to make a turn, the navigator lines up the next pair of leading lights. This provides guidance from Hamburg to the sea, using successive pairs of leading lights.

Leading lights were used in Great Britain as early as 1763 to mark the Port of Liverpool. The first set of range lights in the United States were privately established by subscription at Newburyport Harbor in Massachusetts in 1788.

Leading lights are sometimes designed to be movable, allowing their position to be shifted in the event of a change in the safe channel; these include one at Hilton Head, South Carolina, the original Chatham Light, and the Nantucket Beacon, predecessor to the Nantucket Harbor Range shown above.

== Gallery ==
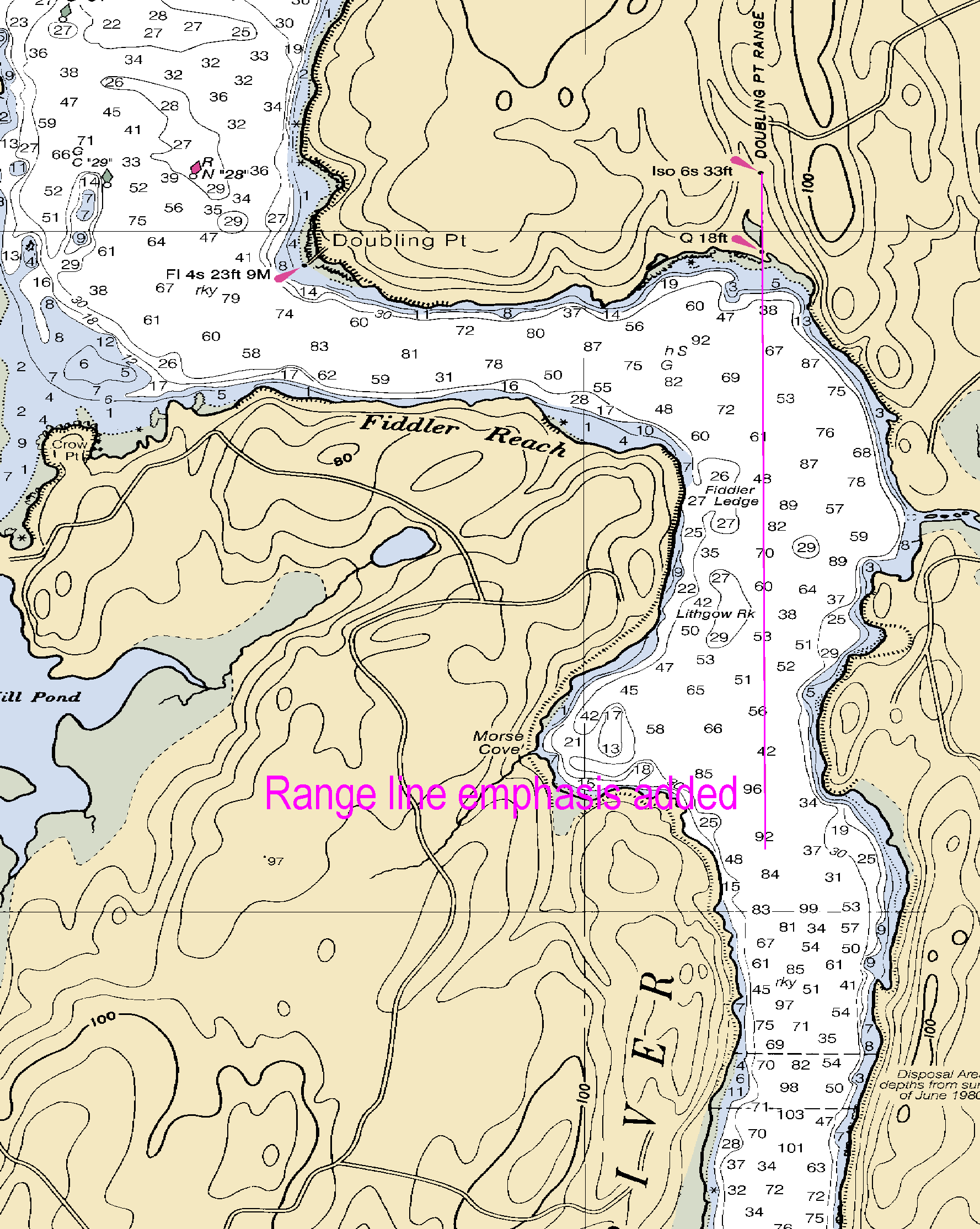
Doubling Point Range Lights on NOAA chart 13296.

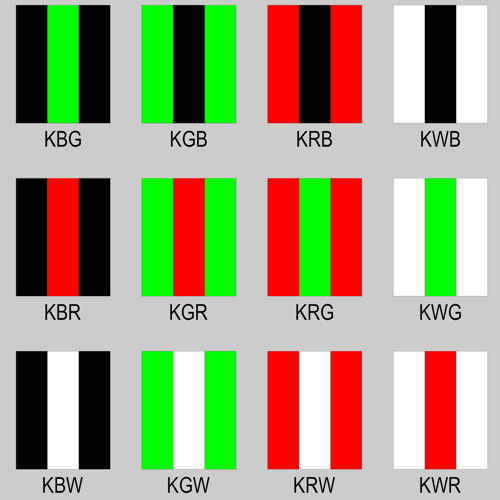
The twelve standard dayboards used on USCG ranges.

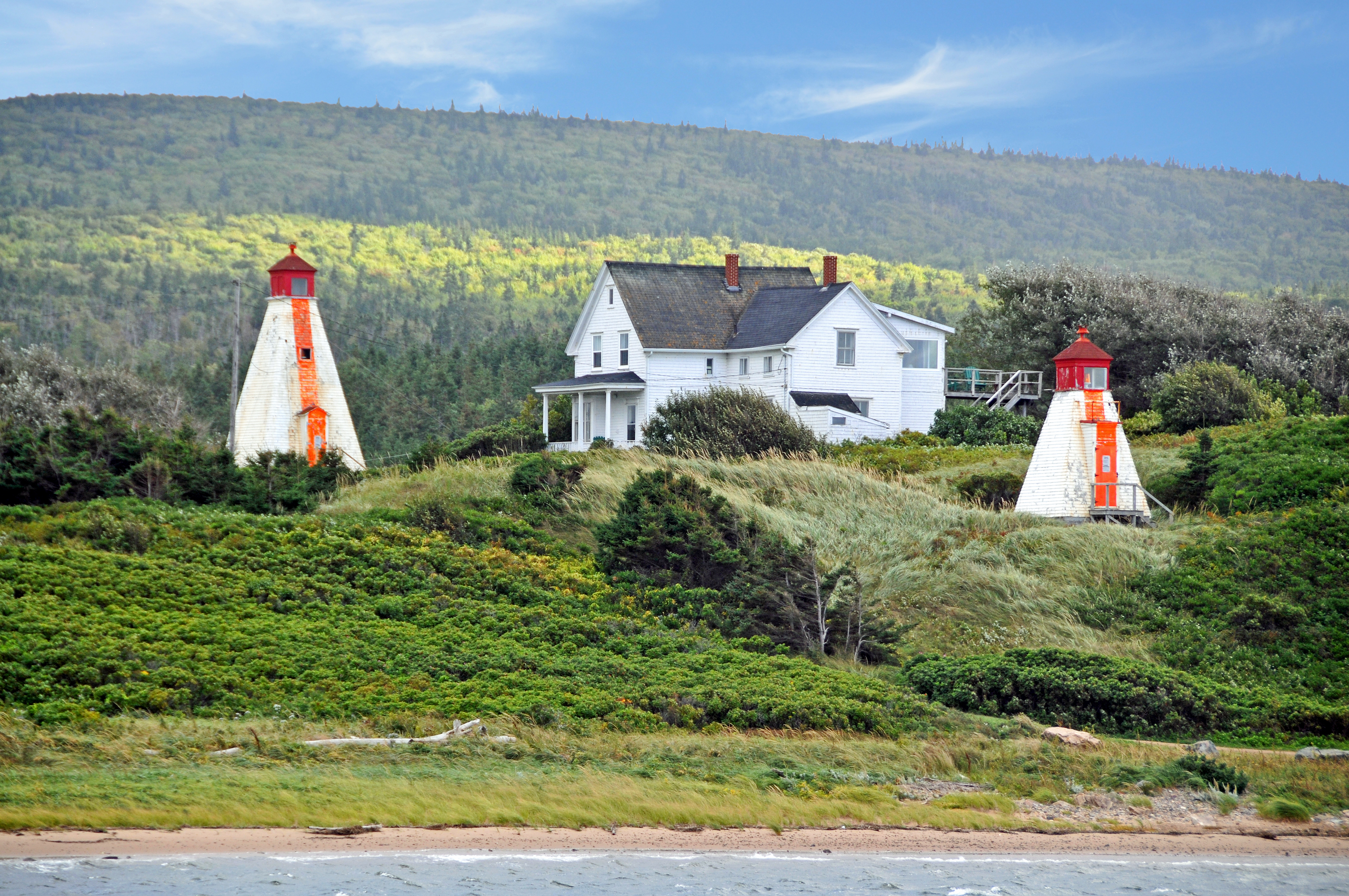
Range lights at Margaree Harbour, Nova Scotia.

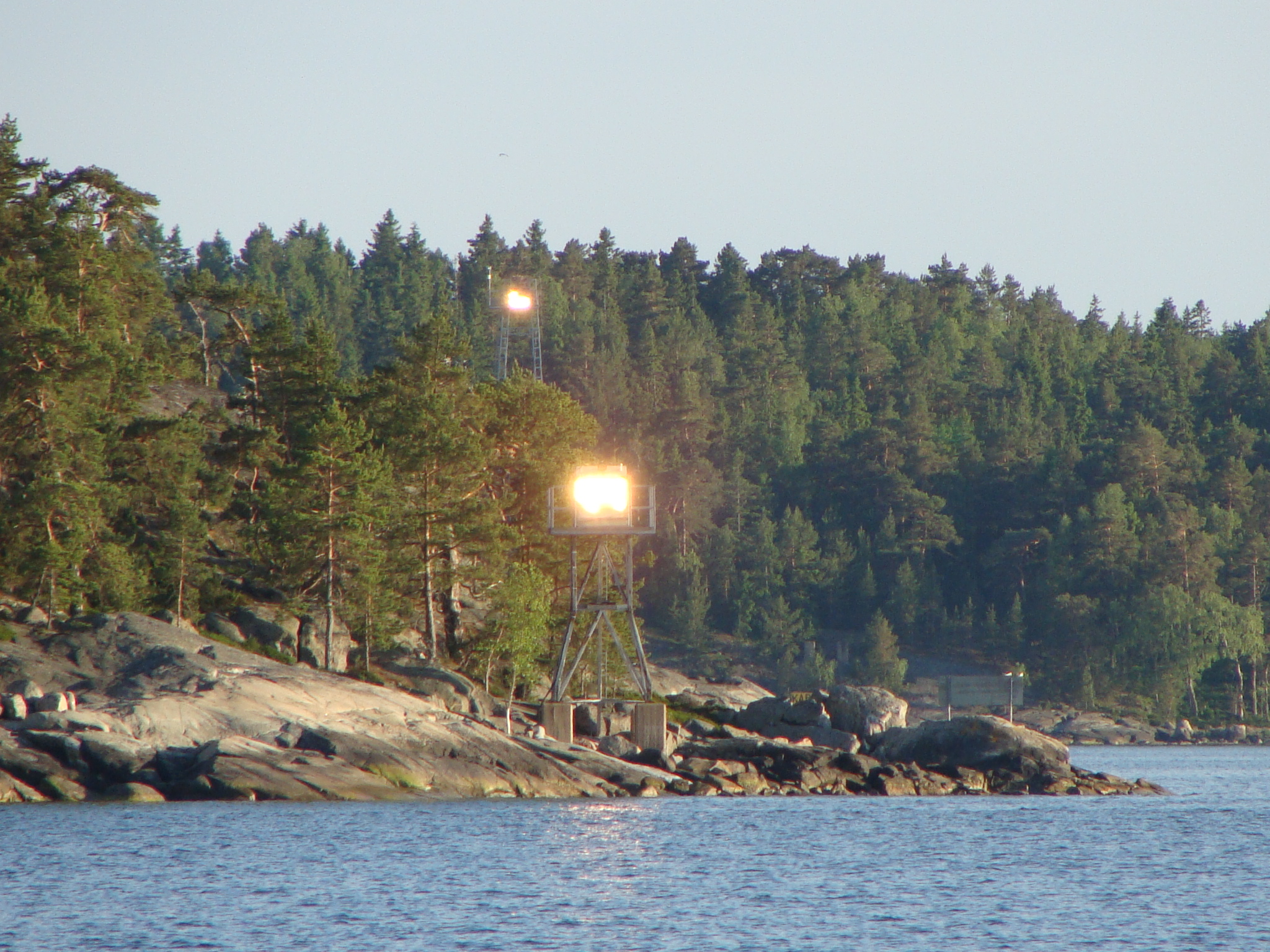
Marking the approach to the island of Seili, Finland

== See also ==
- Daymark
- Sector light
- PEL sector light
- Visual approach slope indicator, similar lights used in aviation to guide pilots to the right approach angle for landing
- Inogon light
