= John Flood (Fenian) =

Irish revolutionary (1835–1909)

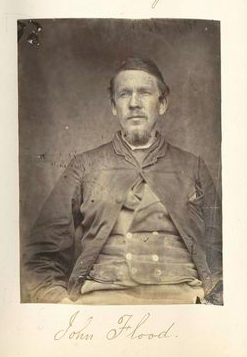
- Born: 21 May 1835; Sutton, County Dublin, Ireland
- Died: 25 August 1909 (aged 74) 'Roseholm', South Side, Gympie, Queensland, Australia
- Occupations: Newspaperman and mining secretary
- Known for: Fenian activism
- Political party: United Irish League; Queensland Federation League
- Spouse: Susan O'Beirne (m. 1877)
- Children: 6, including Rosalie (Sister M. Patricia) and Mary Frances

John Flood (21 May 1835 – 25 August 1909) was an Irish revolutionary and convict exile, and later Australian newspaperman, mining secretary and politician.

== Early years ==
John Flood was born on 21 May 1835, in Sutton, County Dublin, one of nine children of Patrick Flood, shipowner, and his wife Elizabeth (née Kemp). He was later described as a pupil of Clongowes Wood College, but the school records do not confirm this. There is also doubt about his journalistic activities in Ireland, where he may have been involved with the Irish People newspaper. He was known to have been a clerk or apprentice to a Dublin attorney, Daniel Wilson Nolan, and was described at his trial in 1867 as "Mr Flood, the clever and dashing young attorney". However there is no evidence for another claim, that he was articled to prominent barrister and politician Isaac Butt.

== Irish Republican Brotherhood ==
As a leading figure in the Irish Republican Brotherhood (also known as IRB and Fenians), Flood was centrally involved in some of the major actions of the 1860s. He was described as "remarkably handsome" with blue eyes and auburn hair. More importantly, "he was highly intuitive, cool in danger, and absolutely fearless". Flood's first prominent role was as part of the 14-man team that engineered the escape of Fenian founder James Stephens from the Richmond Bridewell in Dublin in November 1865. Along with a childhood friend, Captain Nicholas Weldon, Flood smuggled Stephens out of Dublin harbour past the revenue cutters by boat to Scotland, then overland to London and across the English Channel to France. This escapade earned Flood the nickname Smuggler, and on his return to Ireland he was arrested but discharged for lack of evidence.

Flood was appointed Head Centre of the IRB in England and Scotland, and concentrated on shipping rifles and ammunition from the USA to Ireland. He attended the meeting of the Fenian Directory in London on 10 February 1867, and the following day was part of a crowd of around 1000 Fenians who attempted to storm Chester Castle to seize arms and ammunition. It was intended to ship the weapons to Ireland for use in a rebellion, but the plan was betrayed by an informer. Flood was charged with high treason, although the charge was withdrawn and he was instead tried before a special commission and convicted of treason felony.

== Transportation to Western Australia ==
Sentenced to 15 years' transportation, Flood was brought to colonial Western Australia (along with 60 other Fenians) on Hougoumont, the last convict ship sent to Australia. Flood and his shipmates passed the voyage to Fremantle publishing a handwritten newspaper named The Wild Goose after the Irishmen exiled to continental armies in the sixteenth century. Seven issues were produced, and in some cases multiple copies were made as souvenirs. The paper contained poetry, humorous weather reports and replies to 'correspondents'. The ship arrived at Fremantle on 9 January 1868 and the next day Flood was assigned the job of clerk to the superintendent in the settlement. He was freed in an amnesty in 1871, and set off for Sydney where he started a newspaper named the Irish Citizen which commenced publication in December 1871. The paper had hardly become established when Flood was tempted by a tin rush in the New England district of northern New South Wales. The paper ceased publication in August 1872, and Flood set off fortune hunting in the Palmer River goldfield in far north Queensland.

After two years of struggling to make his fortune Flood decided to cut his losses and retreat to the port of Cooktown, 130 kilometres (81 mi) away. The burgeoning port had two newspapers which both started publication in March 1874. Flood was associated with the Courier from 1874 to 1878, notionally as editor but also as a partner of the proprietor. On 13 August 1877 Flood married Susan O'Beirne, born in Lusta, County Leitrim. Soon after they moved to Brisbane where their eldest child was born in August 1878. Flood became the literary editor of the Brisbane Courier newspaper where he remained from 1878 to 1881.

== Queensland ==
In 1879 famine again broke out in Ireland, and Flood acted as joint secretary for the Queensland Fund for the Relief of Distress in Ireland. This fund was chaired by Kevin O'Doherty, one of a group of men transported to Tasmania in 1848 for their role in the Young Ireland movement. In 1881 Flood moved to Gympie where he lived for the rest of his life. His first business venture was the firm John Flood and Co, mining secretaries, which provided clerical services to mining and other companies including organising meetings and issuing prospectuses. In 1888 Flood returned to the newspaper business, forming the Gympie Newspaper Co Ltd which bought the Gympie Miner, converting it from an afternoon paper to a morning one.

After failing to be elected to the Queensland Parliament for the electorate of Wide Bay in 1888, Flood was victorious the following year in the elections to the Widgee Divisional Board (predecessor of Widgee shire council), serving from 1889 to 1892 and 1894 to 1897, with a term as chairman (mayor) in 1891. In 1895 one of the major figures in Irish politics came to Gympie during a fundraising lecture tour of Australia and New Zealand. Michael Davitt had been a central figure in the plan to raid Chester Castle, but evaded capture until 1870 so did not join Flood and the others on the Hougoumont bound for Western Australia.

Davitt reached Queensland in August 1895 and spent several days visiting Flood in Gympie. Flood chaired his lecture in the Olympic Hall and referred to Davitt as "his very old comrade and his dearest friend on earth". Flood's political involvement continued as a member of the Gympie executive of the Queensland Federation League, which supported the federation of the Australian colonies, and as Gympie President of the United Irish League.

== Death and Memorial ==
Flood continued to operate his mining business although suffering from declining health from around 1904. He died at his home Roseholm in Southside after a relatively short final illness on 22 August 1909, aged 74. A national appeal was launched to build a memorial on his grave in Gympie Cemetery, which took the form of a Celtic cross standing 4.3 metres (14 ft) high, made of polished Aberdeen granite on a base of unpolished local granite. It is engraved with a round tower, an Irish Wolfhound and the national harp of Ireland and includes inscriptions to Flood, his wife and their deceased children. The monument was unveiled by Irish MP William Redmond before a crowd of 2000–3000 on 24 September 1911.
