= Denis Cashman =

Political prisoner and diarist transported to Western Australia

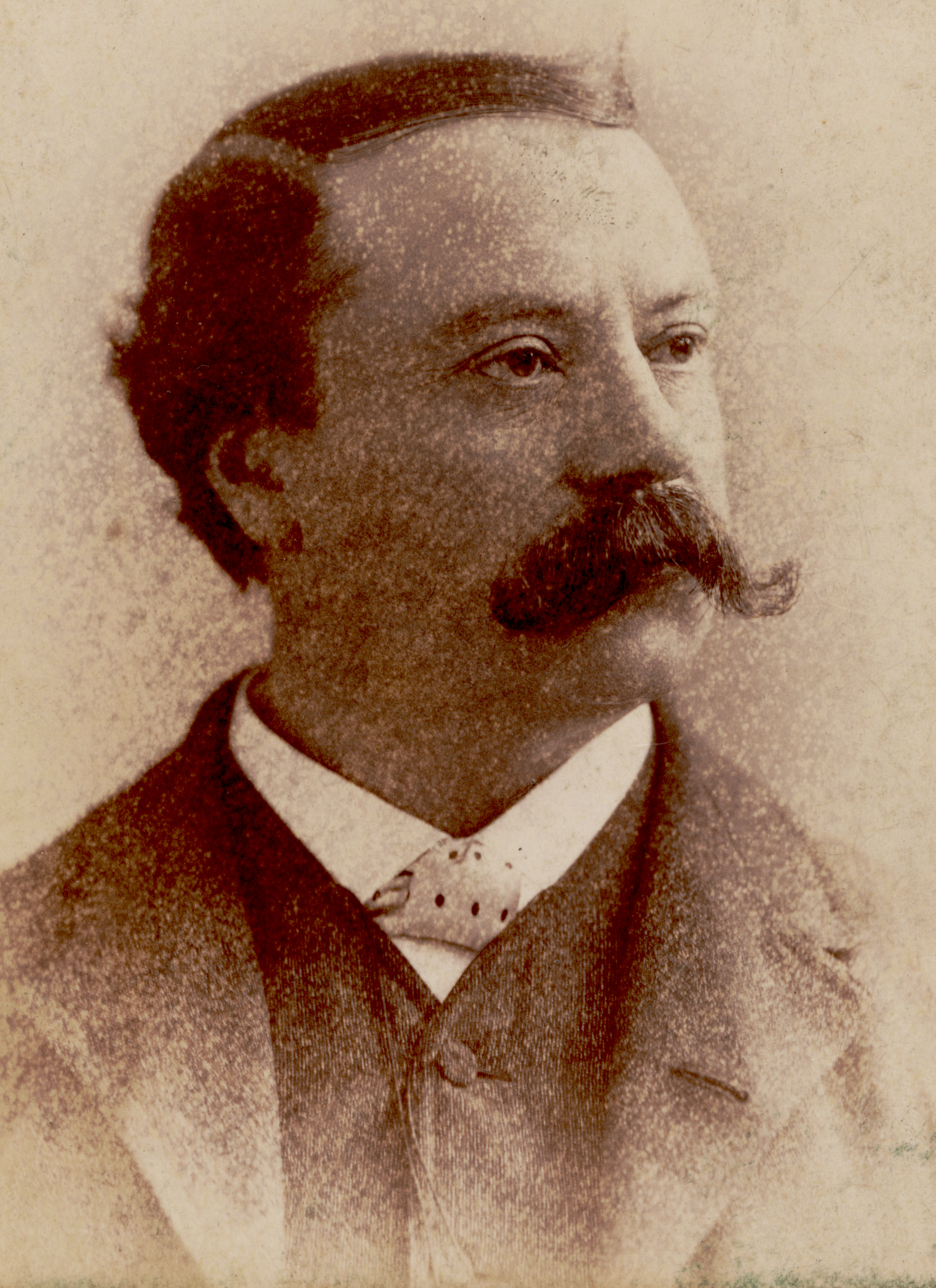
- Cashman, c. 1870s
- Born: March 1843; Dungarvan, County Waterford, Ireland
- Died: 8 January 1897 (aged 54–55); Boston, Massachusetts, U.S.
- Known for: Writing diary of experiences on the Hougoumont
- Spouse: Catherine Veale

Denis Bambrick Cashman (March 1843 – 8 January 1897) was an Irish political prisoner and diarist who was transported to colonial Western Australia due to Fenianism and wrote of his experiences in a diary.

== Early life ==
Cashman was enlisted as a Fenian in 1858, around the age of 16. By the age of 25 he was working as a Law Clerk in Waterford.

On 12 January 1867, Cashman was arrested (the same day his third child was born) and was brought to trial on 19 February 1867 where he pleaded guilty to treason, he was sentenced to seven years penal servitude. He was first transported to Millibank Prison where he awaited transportation to Australia aboard Hougoumont.

== Transportation ==
During the journey Cashman kept a diary detailing the day-to-day activities aboard ship and providing a detailed account of the feelings of the convicts and prisoners on the ship. Cashman was also involved in the production of The Wild Goose, the onboard newspaper.

== Life in the United States ==
Like many civilian Fenians, Cashman was pardoned on 15 May 1869. In late October 1869, he and 14 other Fenians boarded the ship Baringa and sailed from Sydney, Australia to San Francisco, California. He took the Central Pacific Railroad out of California and headed to Boston to meet up with his wife Catherine, his son William, and his good friend and fellow Fenian John Boyle O'Reilly.

While in Boston, he worked in the book and publishing department, and later as the business manager of the Boston Pilot. He worked as a top salesman of Donahoe's Magazine, and later as the superintendent of Waste Water Department in Boston.

Cashman was involved in the initial stages of planning the Catalpa rescue of six Fenians from Western Australia. After hatching the scheme with Thomas McCarthy Fennell, John Devoy, the well known leader of the Clan na Gael travelled to Boston to meet with John Boyle O'Reilly and Cashman.

As former prisoners the two Bostonians had intimate knowledge of the inner workings of Fremantle Prison, and their contributions helped lead to the success of the rescue mission. Cashman strongly supported agrarian agitation in Ireland. In 1881, he published the first biography of Michael Davitt, a founder of the Irish National Land League. Cashman's The Life of Michael Davitt was published the same year Davitt was again imprisoned after he accused the chief secretary of Ireland William Edward Forster of "infamous lying".

Cashman was the pall-bearer at O'Reilly's funeral on 13 August 1890.

== Death ==
Cashman died from heart disease in his Boston home on 8 January 1897. He was survived by his wife Catherine and three children.

== Diary ==
His diary was donated to East Carolina University where Professor of English Charles Sullivan III edited it and in this form it was published in 2003. The diary contains poems by Cashman, John Boyle O'Reilly and John Flood. The diary is currently housed in the East Carolina Manuscript Collection in Joyner Library at East Carolina University.

== See also ==
- List of convicts transported to Australia
- Catalpa rescue
