= Catalpa rescue =

1876 escape of Irish Fenians from a penal colony in Western Australia

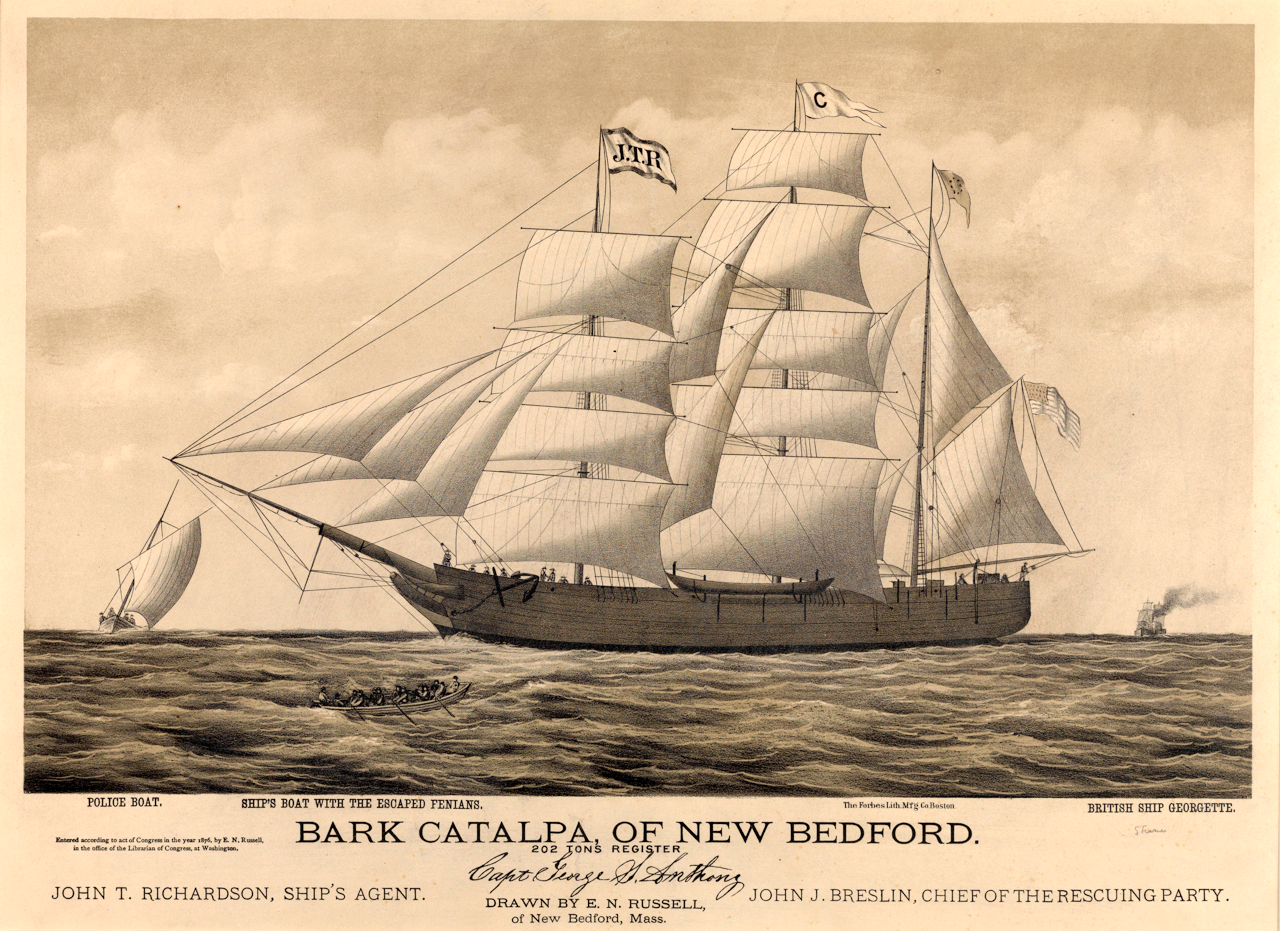
The Catalpa under sail with escapees approaching in whaleboat

The Catalpa rescue was the escape, on 17–19 April 1876, of six Irish Fenian prisoners from the Convict Establishment (now Fremantle Prison), a British penal colony in Western Australia. They were taken on the convict ship Hougoumont to Fremantle, Western Australia, arriving 9 January 1868. In 1869, pardons had been issued to many of the imprisoned Fenians. Another round of pardons was issued in 1871, after which only a small group of "military" Fenians remained in Western Australia's penal system.

In 1874, prisoner James Wilson secretly sent a letter to New York City journalist John Devoy, who worked to organize a rescue. Using donations collected by Devoy from Irish-Americans, Fremantle escapee John Boyle O'Reilly, then living in Boston, purchased a merchant ship, Catalpa, and sailed her to international waters off Rockingham, Western Australia. On 17 April 1876 at 8:30 am, Wilson and five other Fenians working outside the prison walls, Thomas Darragh, Martin Hogan, Michael Harrington, Thomas Hassett, and Robert Cranston, boarded a whaleboat O'Reilly had dispatched, were taken aboard Catalpa, and escaped to New York.

== Fenians and plans to escape ==
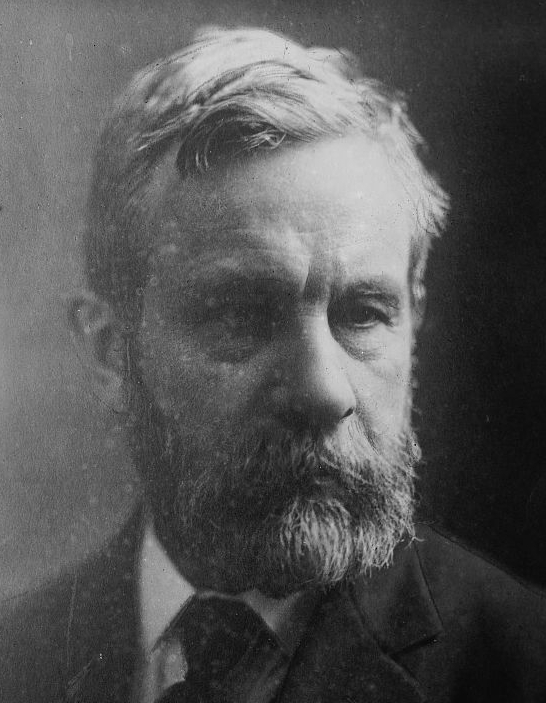
John Devoy

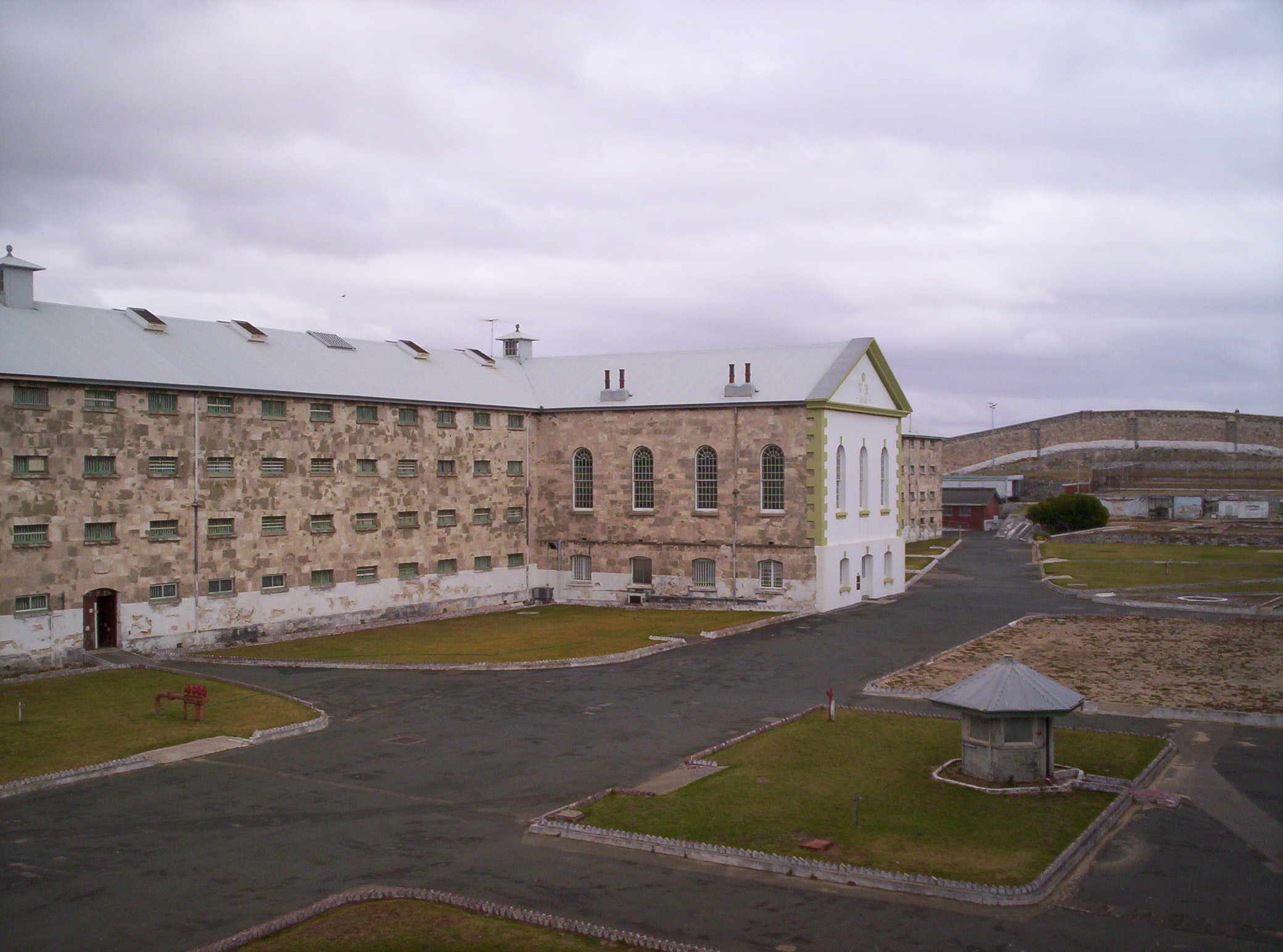
The main cellblock of Fremantle Prison

Between 1865 and 1867, the Dublin Castle administration arrested supporters of the Irish Republican Brotherhood, a secret society dedicated to Irish independence, and transported 62 of them to the British penal colony of Western Australia. They were convicted of crimes ranging from treason-felony to outright rebellion. Sixteen were soldiers who were court-martialled for failing to report or stop the treason and mutinous acts of the others. Among them was John Boyle O'Reilly, later to become the editor of the Boston newspaper The Pilot. They were sent on the convict ship Hougoumont, arriving at Fremantle on 9 January 1868, at the Convict Establishment (now Fremantle Prison).

In 1869, O'Reilly escaped on the whaling ship Gazelle in Bunbury with assistance of the local Catholic priest, Father Patrick McCabe, and settled in Boston. Soon after his arrival, O'Reilly found work with The Pilot newspaper and eventually became editor. In 1871, another Fenian, John Devoy, was granted amnesty in England on condition that he settle outside Ireland. He sailed to New York City and became a newspaperman for the New York Herald. He joined the Clan na Gael, an organization that supported armed insurrection in Ireland.

In 1869, pardons had been issued to many of the imprisoned Fenians. Another round of pardons were issued in 1871, after which only a small group of "military" Fenians remained in Western Australia's penal system. In 1874, Devoy received a smuggled letter from imprisoned Fenian James Wilson, who was among those the British had not released.

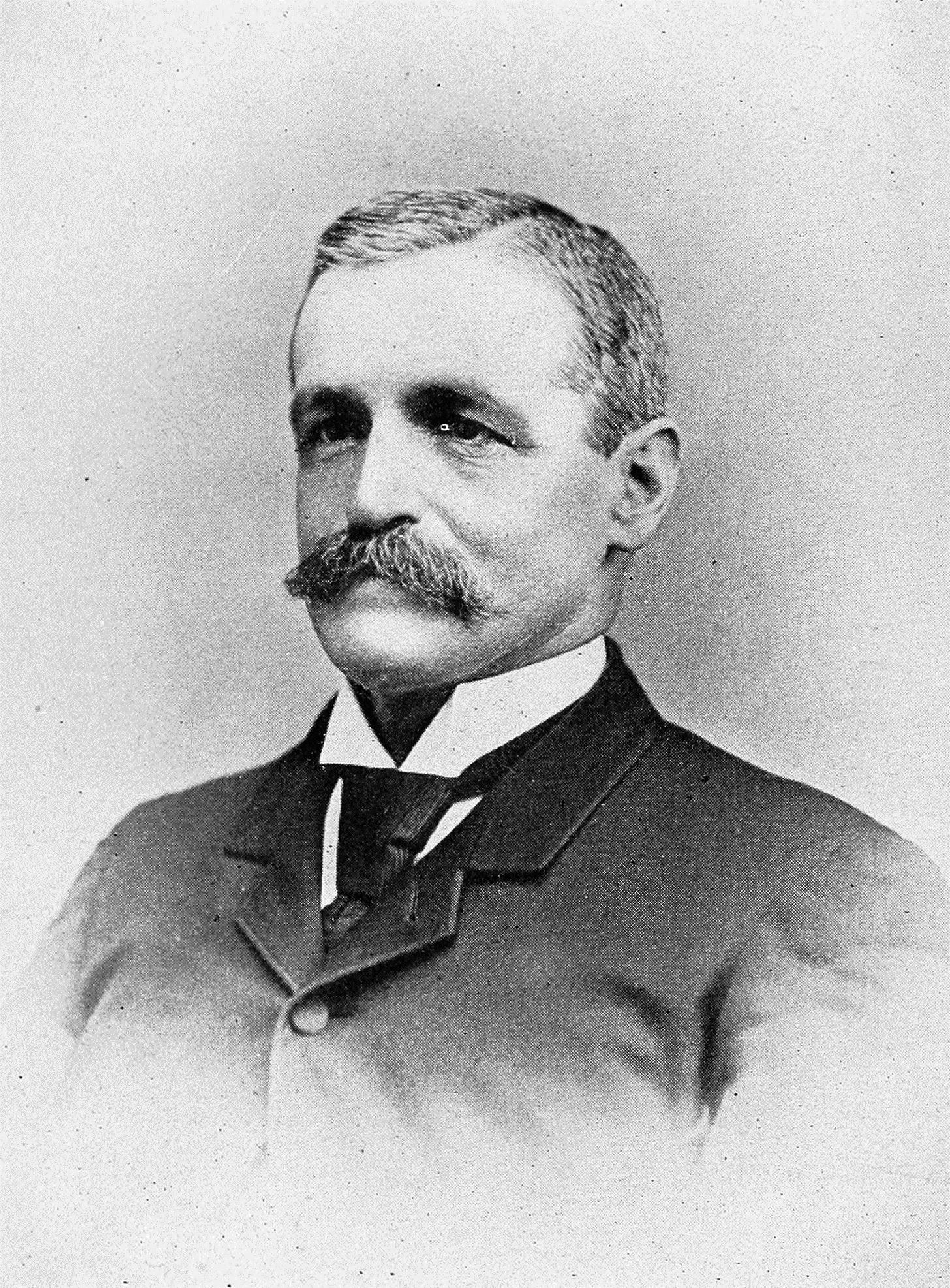
Captain George Anthony, circa 1897

Dear Friend, remember this is a voice from the tomb. For is not this a living tomb? In the tomb it is only a man's body that is good for worms, but in the living tomb the canker worm of care enters the very soul. Think that we have been nearly nine years in this living tomb since our first arrest and that it is impossible for mind or body to withstand the continual strain that is upon them. One or the other must give way. It is in this sad strait that I now, in the name of my comrades and myself, ask you to aid us in the manner pointed out... We ask you to aid us with your tongue and pen, with your brain and intellect, with your ability and influence, and God will bless your efforts, and we will repay you with all the gratitude of our natures... our faith in you is unbound. We think if you forsake us, then we are friendless indeed. —James Wilson

Devoy discussed the matter with O'Reilly and Thomas McCarthy Fennell, and Fennell suggested that a ship be purchased, laden with a legitimate cargo, and sailed to Western Australia, where it would not be expected to arouse suspicion. The Fenian prisoners would then be rescued by stealth rather than force of arms. Devoy approached the 1874 convention of the Clan na Gael and got the Clan to agree to fund a rescue of the men. He then approached whaling agent John T. Richardson, who told them to contact his son-in-law, whaling captain George Smith Anthony, who agreed to help.

== Catalpa ==
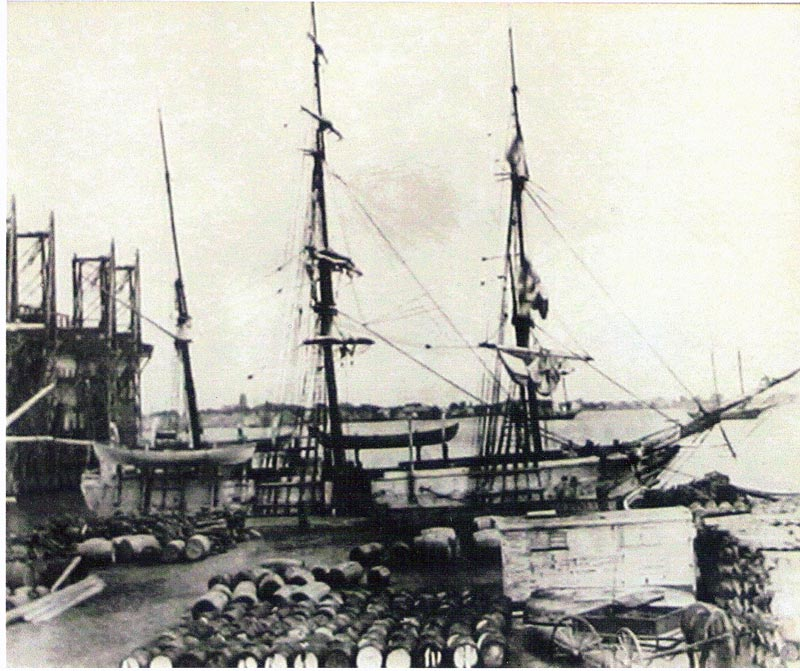
Catalpa in dock. Note whale-oil barrels in the foreground

In 1875, the Clan's committee purchased (in the name of their member James Reynolds) three-masted merchant bark Catalpa for $5,500 ($161,250 in 2025 dollars). She measured 202.05 tons and was 90 feet long, 25 feet in breadth and 12.2 feet deep. She had earlier been a whaleship, sailing out of New Bedford, but had been converted to merchant service with an open hold. Under Captain Anthony's direction, Catalpa was carefully restored to the fitting and rigging of a whaleship "ostensibly for a voyage of eighteen months or two years in the North and South Atlantic". Anthony's recruited crew of twenty-three included a highly qualified first mate, Samuel P. Smith, and a representative of the conspirators, Dennis Duggan, who shipped as a carpenter. The remainder were mostly Kanakas, Malays and Africans, some with invented names.

=== Departure and voyage ===
On 29 April 1875, Catalpa sailed from New Bedford, Massachusetts. At first, most of the crew was unaware of their real mission. Anthony noticed too late that the ship's marine chronometer was broken, so he had to rely on his personal skills for navigation. They hunted whales in the Atlantic for five months before sailing to Fayal Island in the Azores, where they offloaded 210 barrels of sperm whale oil in late October. Unfortunately, much of the crew deserted the ship and they also had to leave behind three sick men. Anthony recruited replacement crew members and set sail for Western Australia on 6 November.

== Undercover operatives ==
To manage the "land end" of the rescue operation, John Devoy signed up Fenian agents John J. Breslin and Thomas Desmond to go to Western Australia. Breslin masqueraded as American businessman "James Collins", with suitable letter of introduction, while Desmond adopted the alias of Johnson. They departed the US in September 1875 and arrived in Fremantle in November 1875, after which "they separated and became ostensible strangers." Coincidentally, the Irish Republican Brotherhood had sent two of their own agents, Denis MacCarthy and John Walsh, to organise an escape attempt, and a local Fenian named John King was working on his own plan. John Breslin was able to bring all three plans together. Breslin, as Collins, lodged in the Emerald Isle Hotel in Fremantle, while Thomas Desmond took a job as a wheelwright and recruited five local Irishmen who were to cut the telegraph lines connecting Perth to Albany on the day of escape (there was no link to the eastern colonies of Australia until 1877). Breslin became acquainted with Sir William Cleaver Robinson, the Governor of Western Australia. Robinson took Breslin on a tour of the Convict Establishment (now Fremantle Prison) where he secretly informed the prisoners that an escape was due. While staying at the hotel, Breslin engaged in a love affair with 22-year-old chamber maid, Mary Tondut. She became pregnant and Anthony paid for her to go to Sydney but never saw her again. In December 1876, Tondut gave birth to Breslin's only child, John Joseph Tondut.

=== Rescue preparations ===
Catalpa fell behind the intended schedule owing to weather conditions. After 11 months at sea, she dropped anchor off Bunbury on 28 March 1876. Anthony and Breslin met and began to prepare for the rescue.

While in Bunbury, Breslin (a.k.a. Collins) stayed in Spencer's Hotel (operated by William Spencer). Anthony and Breslin briefly travelled back together to Fremantle on SS Georgette on 1 April, arriving the next day and were surprised to find the Royal Navy gunboat HMS Conflict in port, necessitating postponement of their plan. Breslin and Anthony travelled to the intended escape departure point in Rockingham. A couple of days later, Anthony and Breslin were invited to a party at the governor's residence. Anthony returned to Bunbury via mail coach on 6 April and discovered that the crew had stowed away another ticket-of-leave convict. Anthony informed the authorities and they took the man ashore. Anthony departed for Rockingham on 15 April.

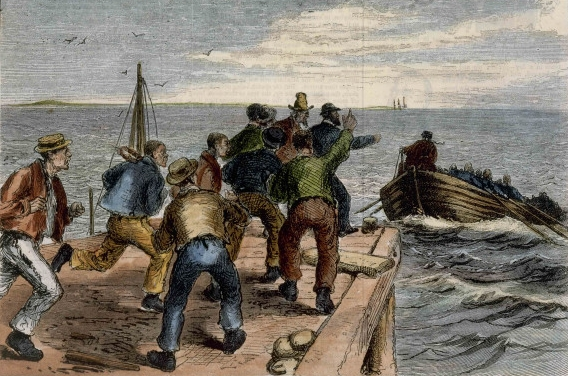
Fenians escape by whaleboat to Catalpa

The escape had been planned for 6 April, but the appearance of Conflict, other Royal Navy ships and customs officers led to a postponement. The escape was rearranged for 17 April, when most of the Convict Establishment garrison was watching the Perth Yacht Club regatta.

== Escape and pursuit ==
Catalpa dropped anchor in international waters off Rockingham and dispatched a whaleboat to shore. At 8:30 am, six Fenians who were working in work parties outside the prison walls, absconded—Thomas Darragh, Martin Hogan, Michael Harrington, Thomas Hassett, Robert Cranston and James Wilson. They were met by Breslin and Desmond and picked up in horse traps. According to Anthony, a seventh Fenian, James Kiely, was intentionally left behind because during his trial he had offered to divulge the names of comrades in an effort to obtain a reduced sentence for himself. Kiely, however, claimed that he was unable to get away from his guard. He was released on licence in 1878 and pardoned in 1905. The men raced 20 kilometres (12 mi) south to Rockingham pier where Anthony awaited them with the whaleboat. A local named James Bell he had spoken to earlier saw the men and quickly alerted the authorities.

As they rowed to Catalpa, a fierce squall struck, breaking the whaleboat's mast. The storm lasted till dawn on 18 April and was so intense that Anthony later stated that he did not expect the small boat to survive. At 7 am, with the storm over, they again made for Catalpa but an hour later spotted the screw steamer Georgette, which had been commandeered by the colonial governor, making for the whaler. The men lay down in the whaleboat and it was not seen by Georgette. Georgette found Catalpa but, in Captain Anthony's absence, the first mate refused to allow the colonial police to board as the ship was outside the colony's three-mile limit. The steamer was forced to return to Fremantle for coal after following the Catalpa for several hours.

As the whaleboat again made for the ship, a police cutter with 30 to 40 armed men was spotted. The two boats raced to reach the Catalpa first, with the whaleboat winning, and the men climbing aboard as the police cutter passed by. The cutter turned, lingered briefly beside Catalpa, and then headed to shore.

=== Saved by the US flag ===
Early on 19 April the refuelled and now armed Georgette returned and came alongside the whaler, demanding the surrender of the prisoners and attempting to herd the ship back into Australian waters. They fired a warning shot with a 12-pounder (5 kg) cannon that had been installed the night before. Ignoring the demand to surrender, Anthony hoisted and pointed towards the U.S. flag, warning that an attack on Catalpa would be considered an act of war against the U.S., and proceeded westward. This was well recognised by Captain O'Grady of Georgette, who had sailed out of New York, was friendly toward Anthony and had, on 1 April, unwittingly entertained him in the steamer's pilot house, closely briefing him on the coast between Fremantle and Rockingham.

Governor Robinson had ordered the police on Georgette not to create an incident outside territorial waters. After steaming around threateningly for about an hour, Georgette headed back to Fremantle and Catalpa slipped away into the Indian Ocean.

== Aftermath ==
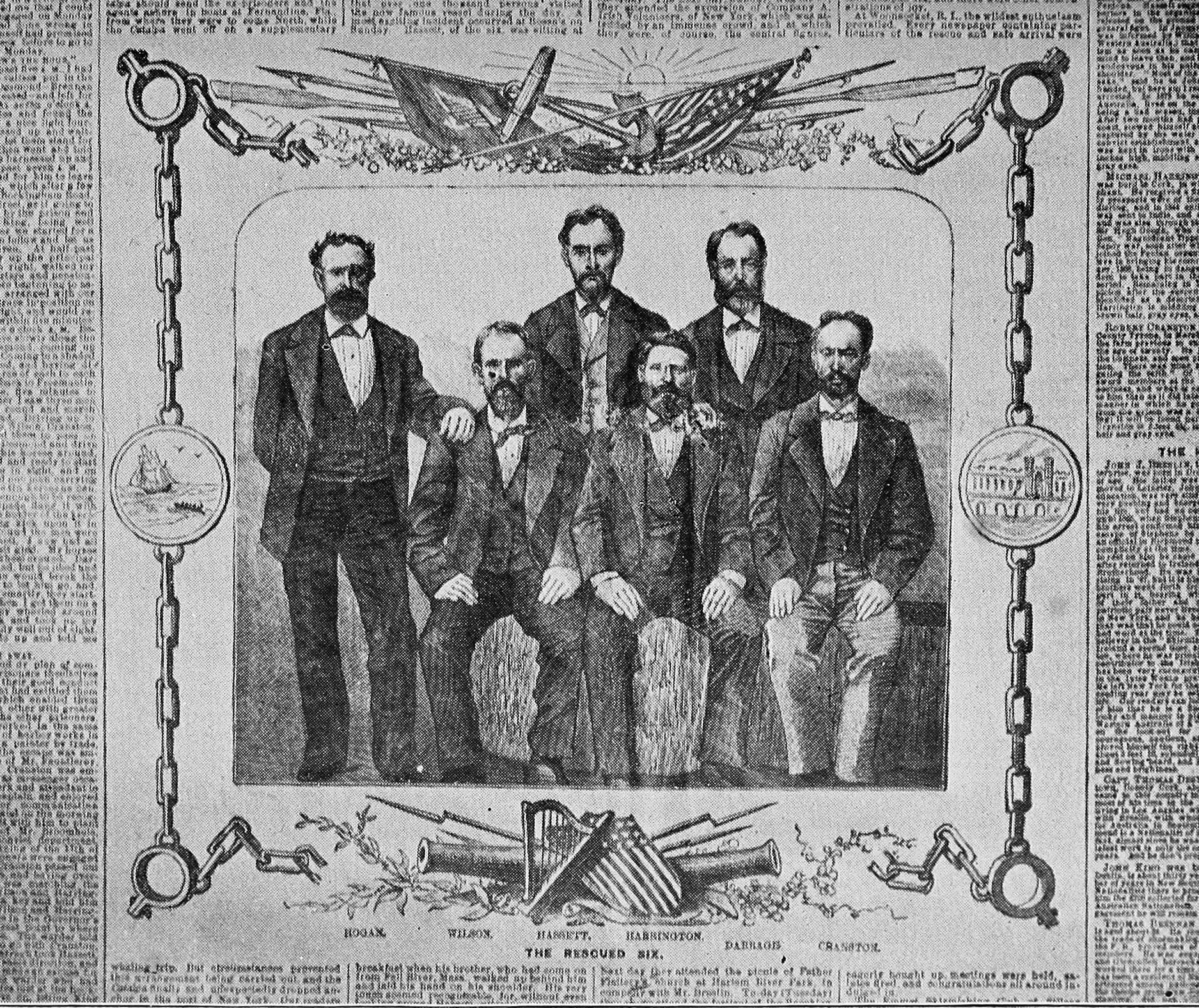
Catalpa six after their arrival in the US

Catalpa did her best to avoid the Royal Navy on her way back to the U.S. O'Reilly received the news of the escape on 6 June and released the news to the press. The news sparked celebrations in the United States and Ireland and anger in Britain and Australia (although there was also sympathy for the cause within the Australian population). Catalpa returned to New York on 19 August 1876. On the other hand, it did not cause any diplomatic issues between the U.S. and the U.K., and the governor of Western Australia was glad to that the Fenians had "become the problem of some other nation".

On 1 December 1876, seven months after the escape, Georgette sank near Busselton.

George Smith Anthony remained in New Bedford with his wife and children, never returning to sea. He was appointed New Bedford Port Inspector in 1886. With the help of a journalist, Z. W. Pease, he published an account of his journey, The Catalpa Expedition, in 1897. He died in 1913.

Thomas Desmond went on to become Sheriff of San Francisco from 1880 to 1881

John Breslin returned as a hero. He continued contact with the Clan na Gael and Devoy, and died in 1887.

Catalpa was presented to Captain Anthony, John Richardson and Henry Hathaway in lieu of payment. She was eventually sold and turned into a coal barge. Not of great value in this capacity, Catalpa was finally condemned at the port of Belize, British Honduras.

=== Mythologising ===
The story of Catalpa's escape grew more dramatic in each retelling. After the first mate declined to allow the police to board the ship, he wrote in the ship's log:

At 8 Am the Steam Ship Georgette hailed me and her captian [sic] asked me if I had seen a boat with a lot of men in it—I told him no. Another man asked me if the Captian was on board—I told him no. Asked if I had any strangers on board—I told him no. Then asked if he might come on board—I told him no. The steamer then left me and I stood on my course.

In the version of the tale told by Anthony (who was not a witness), it became:

The captain of the English steamer asked where the boat was which was missing from the cranes... "I don't know anything about it," said Mr. Smith. "Can I come aboard?" asked the officer. "Not by a damned sight," was Mr. Smith's reply.

In The Emerald Whaler (1960) by William Laubenstein, a fictionalised version, the encounter became much more confrontational:

This is Her Majesty's ship of war Georgette... "Hell of a lookin' warship," Sam jibed. "What's yer guns?" ... "What is your business?" ... "I'm on th' high seas, as any fool can see," Sam countered ... "Your larboard boat is missing" ... "Captain has it" ... "I am going to board your ship!" ... "Like hell you are! You try it an' you'll be goddamned good and sorry! ... What the hell did we lick the pants offn' you damn Britishers in 1812 about? ... You don't own the goddamn ocean!"

In addition, over the years, Georgette was presented as bigger and larger than it actually was: roughly the same size as Catalpa, and outfitted with a single cannon. In Thomas Keneally's The Great Shame and the Triumph of the Irish in the English-Speaking World (1999), she is described as the Royal Navy's newest ship and being twice the size of Catalpa.

=== Memorials ===
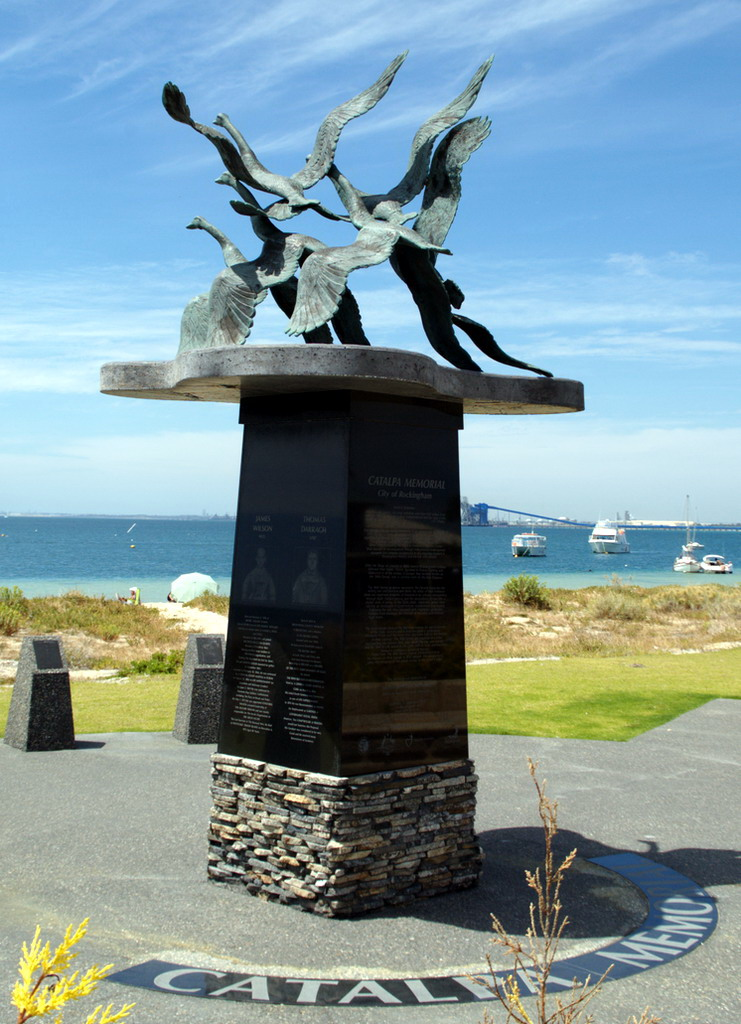
Catalpa Memorial.

On 9 September 2005 a memorial was unveiled in Rockingham to commemorate the escape. The memorial, a large statue of six wild geese, was created by Western Australian artists Charlie Smith and Joan Walsh Smith. The geese refer to the phrase "The Wild Geese" which was a name given to Irish soldiers who served in European armies after being exiled from Ireland. The Fenians transported to Western Australia adopted the phrase for themselves during their voyage on board Hougoumont, even publishing a shipboard newspaper entitled The Wild Goose.

In 1976 a memorial stone was erected in New Bedford, Massachusetts, to commemorate the 100th anniversary of the rescue. New Bedford was the home port of Catalpa.

=== Exhibition ===
From 22 September 2006 to 3 December 2006 an exhibition, called "Escape: Fremantle to Freedom," opened at Fremantle Prison displaying many artefacts relating to the Catalpa rescue. The exhibition received over 20,000 visitors.

The National Museum of Ireland put on an exhibition in Collins Barracks between 18 and 19 April 2026 called "Catalpa 150; The Catalpa Fenian Rescue, 17th to 19th April 1876" to commemorate the 150 year anniversary of the rescue. The exhibition displayed the U.S. flag that was raised during the stand-off between the Catalpa and the Georgette.

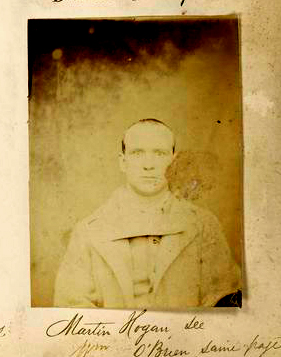
Martin Hogan (1833–1901)

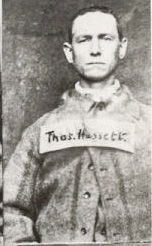
Thomas Hassett (1841–1893)

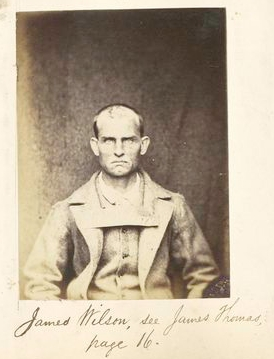
James Wilson (1836–1921)

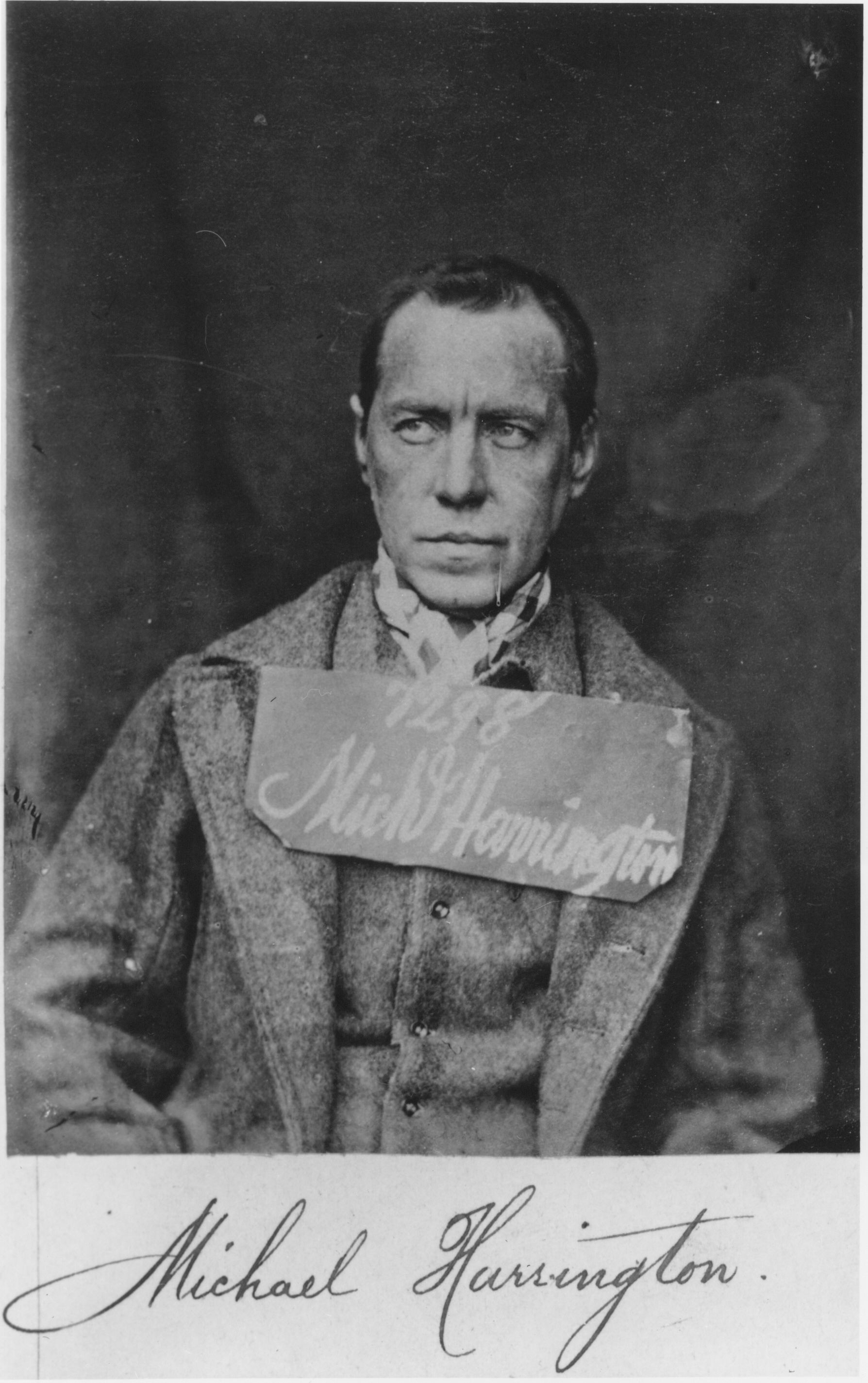
Michael Harrington (1825–1886)

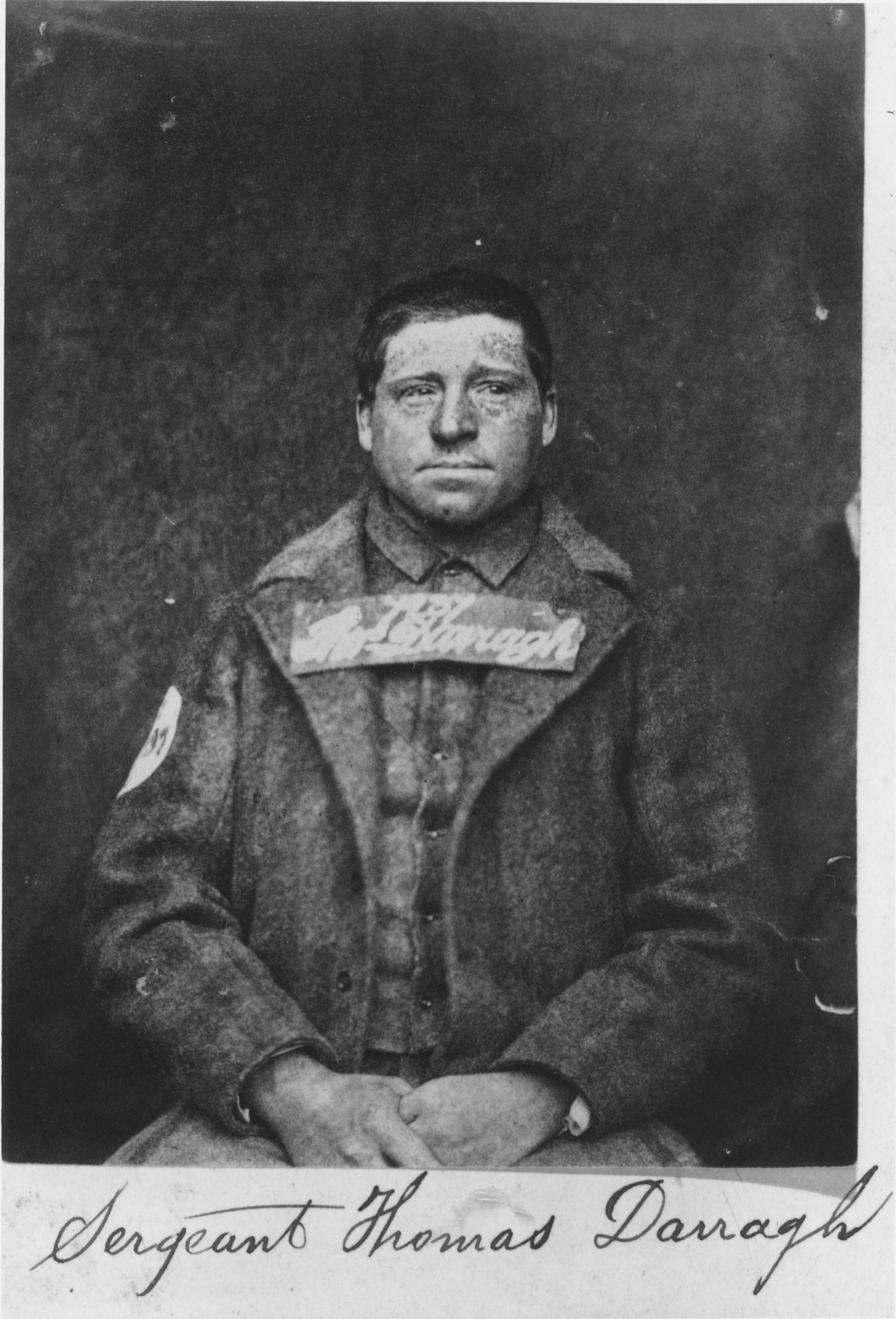
Thomas Darragh (1834–1912)

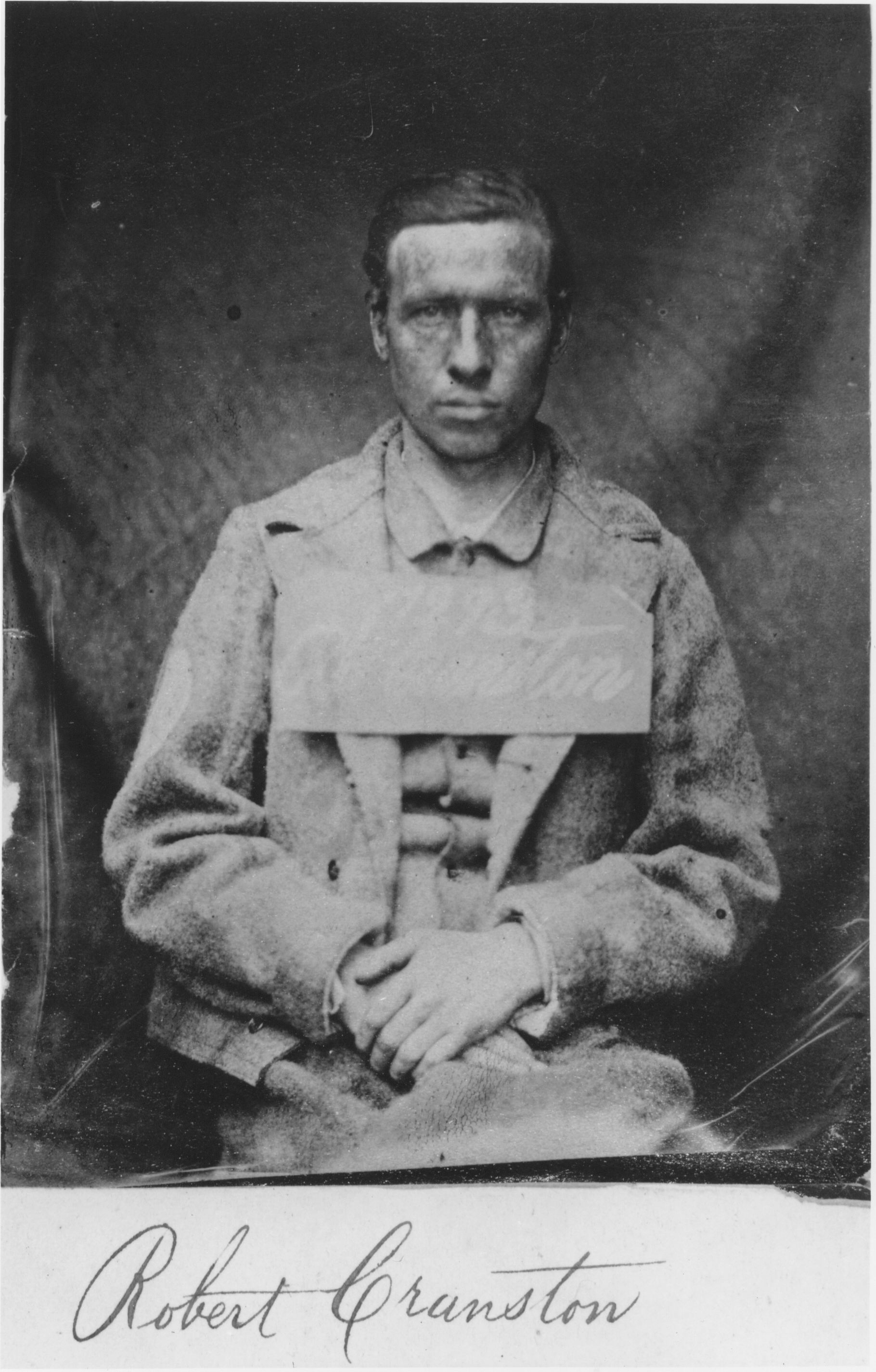
Robert Cranston (1842–1914)

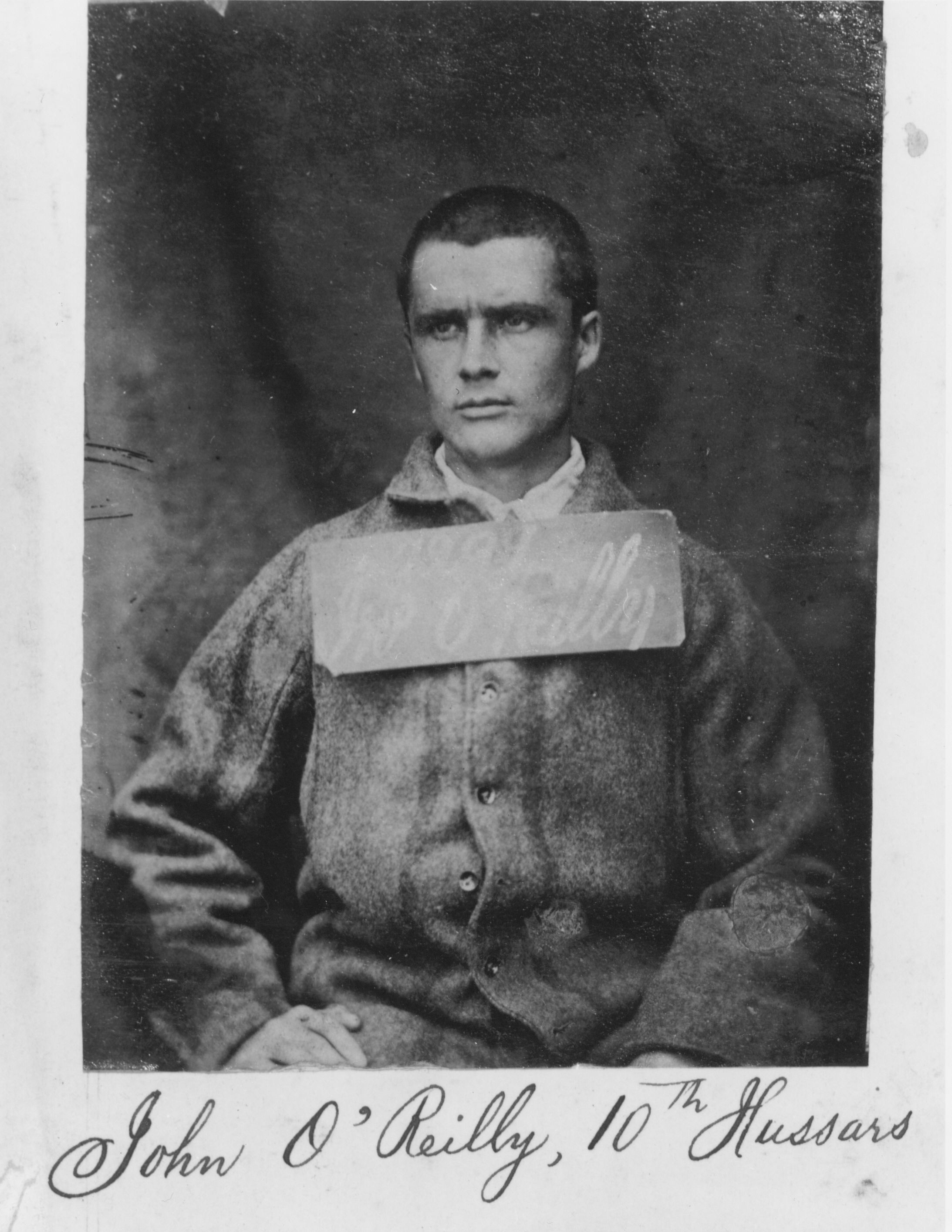
John Boyle O'Reilly (1844–1890)

=== In popular culture ===
So come all you screw warders and jailers
Remember Perth regatta day
Take care of the rest of your Fenians
Or the Yankees will steal them away.

— Traditional Lyrics and guitar chords

On the seventeenth of April last the Stars and Stripes did fly
On board the bark Catalpa, waving proudly to the sky;
She showed the green above the red as she did calmly lay
Prepared to take the Fenian boys in safety o'er the sea.

— Traditional Full lyrics
- Musician and local historian Brendan Woods authored a theatrical production about the breakout titled The Catalpa directed by Gerry Atkinson with a cast of 22. On 15 November 2006 The Catalpa premiered at the Fremantle Town Hall and ran until 25 November. The play was based on the diaries of Denis Cashman, with the poetry of John Boyle O'Reilly set to music and dance supported by a five-part Musical ensemble. The show sold out on three of its four night run.
- Irish rebel music band The Wolfe Tones recorded a song about the Catalpa incident called The Fenians' Escape.
- The Real McKenzies, a Celtic punk band from British Columbia, Canada, included their rendition of the song "The Catalpa" on the 2005 Fat Wreck Chords album "10,000 Shots".
- Donal O'Kelly's one man play Catalpa was an international success, winning a Scotsman Fringe First Award at the 1996 Edinburgh Festival Fringe and the Critic's Prize at the Melbourne International Festival in 1997.
- Western Australian folk music band, The Settlers released the album Bound For Western Australia in 1978 that included the song The Catalpa
- Australian folk band, The Bushwackers featured the song The Catalpa on the album Beneath the Southern Cross.
- An Australian Broadcasting Corporation production, The Catalpa Rescue, was shown on ABC Television on 25 October 2007.
- Fenian Park, Catalpa Park and O'Reilly Park, in Glen Iris, Bunbury.
- In 2021 a new GAA team was founded in the Rockingham Area to compete in the GAAWA competitions called Na Fianna Catalpa

== See also ==
- Cyprus mutiny
- Frederick escape

== Video and media ==
- Irish Escape Documentary produced by the PBS Series Secrets of the Dead
