= Mary Boyle O'Reilly =

American novelist

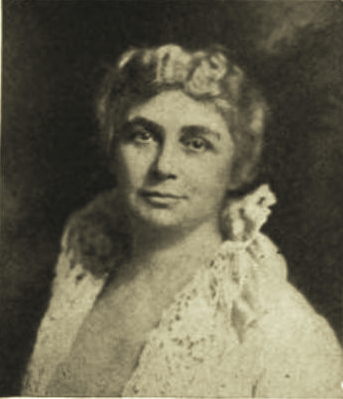
Mary Boyle O'Reilly

Mary Boyle O'Reilly (May 18, 1873 – October 21, 1939) was an American social reformer, clubwoman, and journalist during World War I. She was of Irish descent.

== Early life and education ==
Mary ("Molly") Boyle O'Reilly was born in Charlestown, Massachusetts, the daughter of Irish-born writer John Boyle O'Reilly and Mary Murphy O'Reilly (1850-1897), a journalist for the Young Crusader who wrote under the name of Agnes Smiley. She attended school at the Sacred Heart convent in Providence, Rhode Island and the Gilman School for Girls.

== Career ==
=== Reform work and writings ===
In 1901, O'Reilly helped to found the Guild of St. Elizabeth, a settlement house in South Boston. She was active in the Women's Educational and Industrial Union, the Boston Public Library, the Tuberculosis Society, and the Massachusetts Conference of Charities. O'Reilly was appointed to the State Prison Commission in Massachusetts in 1907, to oversee children's institutions, including reformatories and orphanages. She resigned that position in 1911. Reform writings by O'Reilly included a 1910 exposé on "baby farms" in New Hampshire, and another in 1913, on unsafe working conditions in canneries. "The canned food consumed by the people of the United States is prepared, only too often, amid conditions of revolting filth, by workers whose bodies are unclean and diseased, and who are forced to live and work in an environment that makes cleanliness and health impossible," she wrote, after going undercover as a cannery worker. She testified before a congressional committee about the conditions she saw among women in the canneries.

=== Foreign and war correspondent ===
A 1913 photograph of Mary Boyle O'Reilly, from the Harris & Ewing photographic collection, Library of Congress; LCCN2016864242

O'Reilly joined The Newspaper Enterprise Association in 1913, as a foreign correspondent; she worked from the association's London office, but traveled to both Russia and Mexico to report stories in 1913. In 1914 she conducted the first interview with Joseph Caillaux, the French politician, after his wife confessed to killing journalist Gaston Calmette. In 1915, King Haakon VII of Norway spoke to O'Reilly about his country's neutrality during World War I. In 1916 she interviewed Lady Ernest Shackleton about her husband's missing expedition to Antarctica.

During World War I, she traveled to Belgium in disguise, several times, and was briefly a prisoner of the Germans. She wrote about the war for Harper's Magazine, The Boston Pilot, and the Boston Globe. She witnessed the burning of Leuven, and worked with nurse Edith Cavell for a month. In London in 1916 she intervened on the question of Roger Casement's diaries "as the daughter of an Irish patriot" with his solicitor George Gavan Duffy. "She has suffered arrest in every country now at war, save Serbia, where she has never been," reported one newspaper of O'Reilly's war work. She flew above the Chesapeake Bay with the U. S. Coast Guard to report on their work in 1917. She lectured on her war experiences in the United States after 1917. After the war, she was especially concerned with the way false and lurid stories about German atrocities were circulating, and sought to correct what she called "the Fakes". She also exposed "fake philanthropies" for war relief, often run by and targeting American women.

=== Fiction ===
O'Reilly wrote short stories and at least one novel. Her short-short story "In Berlin" was included in The Best American Short Stories of 1915, edited by Edward J. O'Brien. Her novel, The Black Fan, was published in 1928.

== Personal life ==
Mary Boyle O'Reilly died at home in Auburndale, Massachusetts in 1939, aged 66 years. Her papers are archived at the Boston Public Library, and at Boston College. Her letters to Rev. Thomas Dawson are archived in the National Library of Ireland. The O'Reilly family's house on Main Street in Hull, Massachusetts has a marker from the Hull Historical Commission.

Philosopher William Ernest Hocking married Mary's sister, educator Agnes Boyle O'Reilly, co-founder of Shady Hill School.

She has a street named after her "Mary Boyle Way” in South Boston.
