= James Wilson (Irish nationalist) =

Australian convict and Fenian from Ireland (1836–1921)

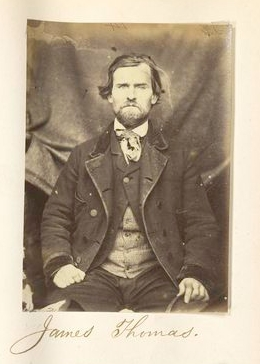
Wilson as 'James Thomas'

James Wilson (6 February 1832 – 6 November 1921) or Séamas Mac Liammóir, was an Irish Fenian and British soldier. In 1867, he was transported as a convict to Western Australia and later escaped during the Catalpa rescue.

== Biography ==
Born James McNally in Newry, County Down, Ireland on 6 February 1832. He joined the British Army at the age of 17 (enlisting under a false name) to avoid arrest for the battery of a police officer.

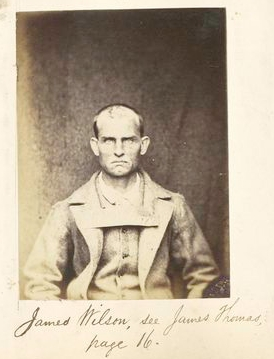
Wilson at Mountjoy prison, 1866.

He served in India before returning to Ireland, where he became a Fenian, being sworn into the Irish Republican Brotherhood in 1864. The following year, he deserted, along with Martin Hogan, from the British Army in anticipation of an expected Fenian uprising.

On 10 February 1866, he was arrested by the police who discovered him hiding in a safe house in Dublin. They had been betrayed by an informant, Patrick Curran.

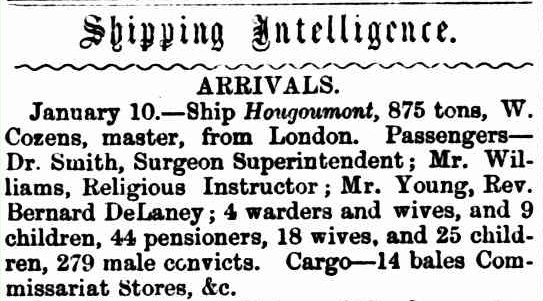
News clipping from the Perth Gazette and West Australian Times, 17 January 1868, announcing the arrival of the Hougoumont in Fremantle

Wilson, along with other military Fenians, was tried, found guilty of desertion and mutinous conduct, and sentenced to death. However, this sentence was later commuted to penal servitude for life, and they were transported to Western Australia. In October 1867, Wilson and sixty-one other Fenians began the long sea voyage on board the Hougoumont.

Life in Fremantle was hard. Wilson had been sentenced to penal servitude, and found the monotony and work involved so hard that he wrote to a New York City journalist, John Devoy entitling his letter, A Voice From the Tomb.

Devoy was moved enough by Wilson's description of the conditions under which he and his colleagues laboured to begin collecting money from the American-Irish community to organise their rescue. When enough money had been collected and a whaling ship, the Catalpa, had been purchased, George Anthony was hired to captain the ship.

In 1876, the Catalpa sailed to Western Australia and rescued Wilson and five other Fenian prisoners. Initially two British ships sought to stop the progress of the Catalpa and recapture the men, but after receiving a warning shot, Anthony raised the American flag. After this, the two ships did not fire upon them again and the ship sailed unimpeded to New York, the journey taking some four months.

Wilson settled in Rhode Island, where he married and lived out the rest of his life. In 1920, Wilson met Éamon de Valera who was touring the United States, trying to gain support for his Irish Republic. Wilson died on 6 November 1921; his remains are buried in the cemetery on the grounds of St. Mary's Church in Pawtucket, Rhode Island.

== See also ==
- List of convicts transported to Australia
- Catalpa rescue
