= John Boyle O'Reilly =

Irish poet, journalist, author and activist (1844–1890)

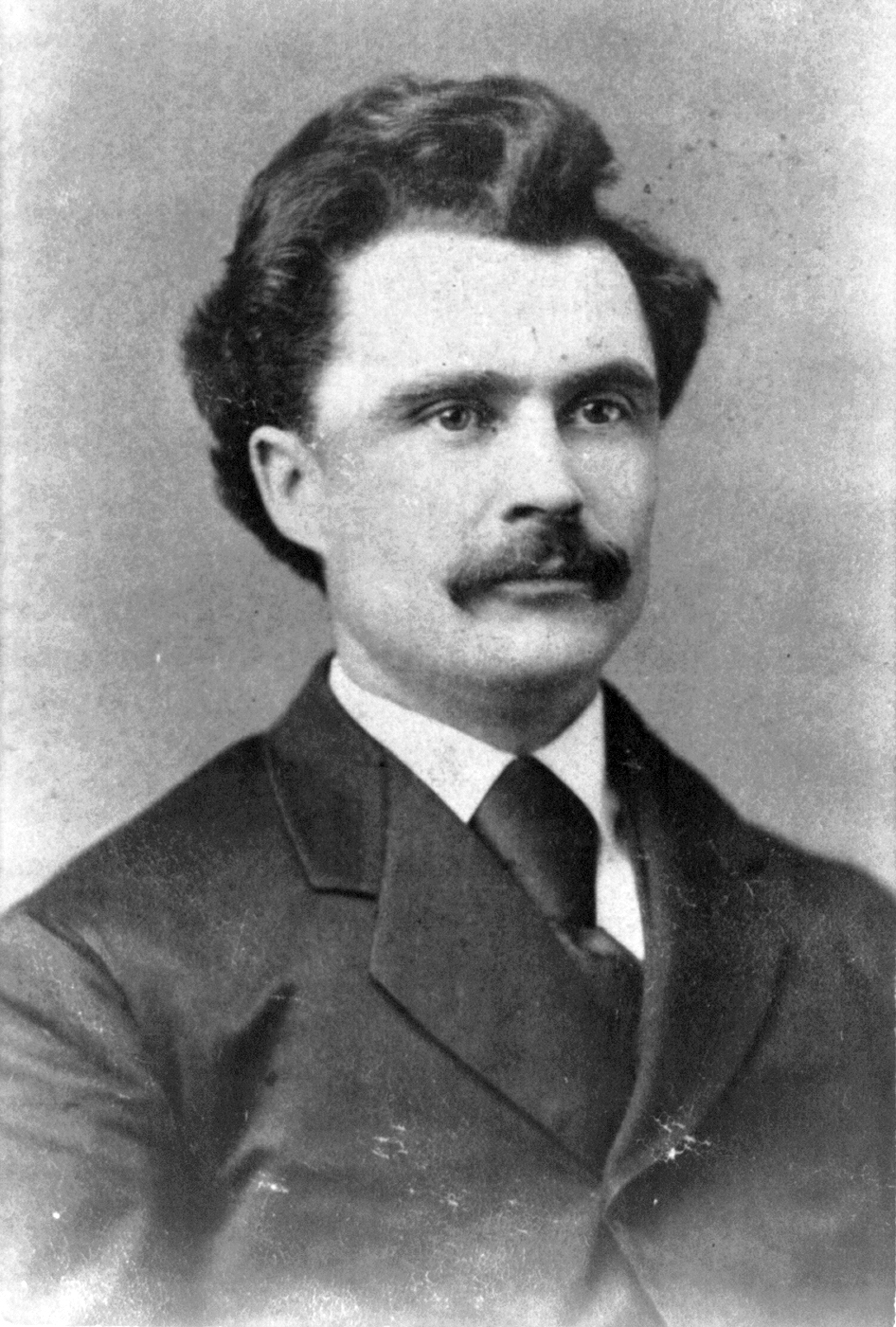
- O'Reilly in 1871
- Born: 28 June 1844; Dowth, County Meath, Ireland
- Died: 10 August 1890 (aged 46); Hull, Massachusetts, U.S.
- Resting place: Holyhood Cemetery, Massachusetts
- Occupations: Journalist, poet, fiction writer
- Spouse: Mary Agnes Murphy (m.1872–his death)
- Children: 4
- Writing career
- Language: English
- Period: 1873–1890
- Notable work: Moondyne
- Movement: Irish Literary Revival

John Boyle O'Reilly (Irish: Seaghán Baoighil Ó Raghallaigh; 28 June 1844 – 10 August 1890) was an Irish poet, journalist, author and activist. As a youth in Ireland, he was a member of the Irish Republican Brotherhood, or Fenians, for which he was transported to Western Australia.

After escaping to the United States, he became a prominent spokesperson for the Irish diaspora community and culture through his editorship of the Boston newspaper The Pilot, in addition to his personal writings and lecture tours.

Born in Dowth, County Meath, O'Reilly moved to his aunt's residence in England as a teenager and became involved in journalism before enlisting in the British Army shortly thereafter. In 1863, he left the army after becoming discontented with British rule in Ireland.

In 1864, after returning to Ireland, O'Reilly joined the Irish Republican Brotherhood under an assumed name and was part of the group for two years until he and many others were arrested by the British authorities in early 1866. After a trial that same year, he was sentenced to death, but the sentence was subsequently commuted to twenty years of penal servitude.

In 1867, O'Reilly was transported to Western Australia. He was sent to the town of Bunbury, from where he escaped two years later, assisted by a Catholic priest, Patrick McCabe, from Arnaghan, Gowna, County Cavan.

After his escape, O'Reilly moved to Boston and embarked on a successful writing and journalism career. He authored works such as Moondyne (1879) and Songs from the Southern Seas (1873), and wrote poems such as The Cry of the Dreamer, The White Rose and In Bohemia. He married Mary Murphy in 1872 and had four daughters.

In his final years of life, O'Reilly suffered from various health problems before dying of an overdose in 1890 at his summer home in Hull, Massachusetts. His memorial service, held at Tremont Temple, was a major public event.

O'Reilly's literature and involvement in civil rights causes have been celebrated over the years.

== Early life ==
O'Reilly was born on 28 June 1844 at Dowth Castle to William David O'Reilly (1808–1871) and Eliza O'Reilly (née Boyle) (1815–1868) near Drogheda. His father was a headmaster. He was the third child out of six. Ireland was at that time a part of the United Kingdom and many Irish people opposed British rule, and there was a strong nationalist movement in Ireland. O'Reilly's relatively wealthy family was fiercely patriotic; his mother was closely related to nationalist John Allen, who had played an important role in Robert Emmet's rising in 1803.

A year after O'Reilly's birth, the Great Famine began, an event that would shape O'Reilly's life and beliefs. Most of O'Reilly's closest family managed to survive the famine, however many of O'Reilly's classmates lost their lives because of it. The son of a schoolmaster, O'Reilly received a good early education. When he was about thirteen his older brother contracted tuberculosis and O'Reilly took his place as apprentice at a local newspaper.

=== England ===
In 1859, at the age of fifteen, O'Reilly moved to Preston, Lancashire to live with his aunt Christina and uncle James Watkinson, a sea master, after being convinced by his uncle to travel back with him to England to visit. He took up work on local newspaper the Preston Guardian. In June 1861, O'Reilly enlisted in the Volunteer Force's 11th Lancashire Rifle Volunteers Corps, with whom he received military training. On returning to Ireland in March 1863, he enlisted in the British Army's 10th Royal Hussars regiment in Dublin. While O'Reilly was in the army, he grew disillusioned with British rule after witnessing first-hand government policies which he perceived as negatively affecting Irish Catholics. He left the army shortly thereafter.

== Irish Republican Brotherhood ==
=== Irish Republican Brotherhood and arrest ===
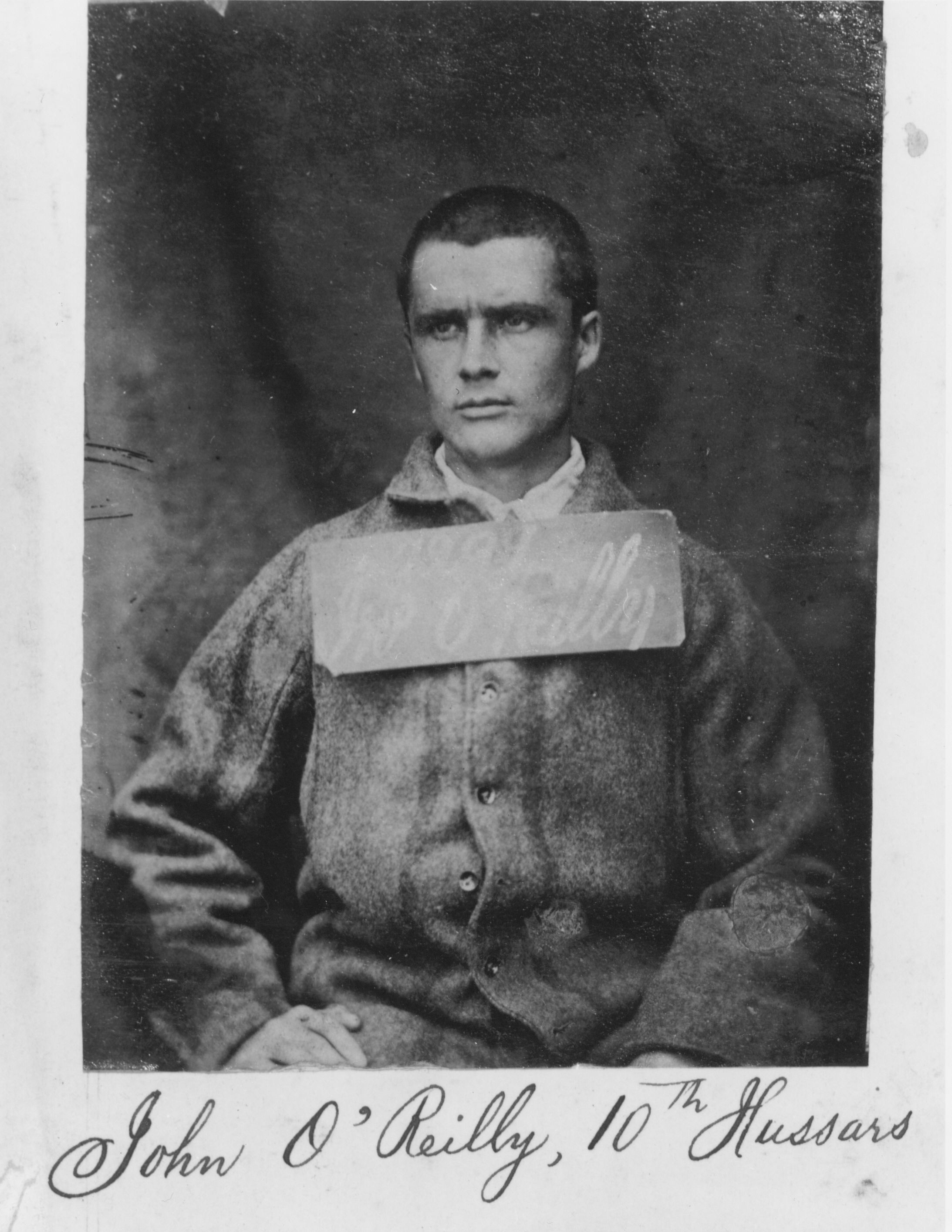
Photograph of imprisoned O'Reilly, 1866

In 1864, O'Reilly joined the Irish Republican Brotherhood, then commonly known as the "Fenians", a secret society of rebels dedicated to an armed uprising against British rule. He turned his energies to recruiting more Fenians within his regiment, bringing in up to 80 new members. He presented himself to conspirators in Clonmel under the false name of Kelly. He assisted in recruiting Irish young men and soldiers to the Brotherhood.

In February 1866 O'Reilly along with many other Fenians were arrested and sent to Arbour Hill military prison. On 27 June 1866 (the eve of his 22nd birthday) O'Reilly's trial by court martial began; he was charged with treason. He was found guilty and sentenced to death, but due to his age the sentence was commuted to life imprisonment and later 20 years' penal servitude.

From that point on he spent around 15 months in some of England's most notorious prisons such as Millbank, Pentonville and Dartmoor. During this time O'Reilly attempted to escape twice but was quickly recaptured and placed in solitary confinement.

=== Transportation and life in Australia ===
On 10 October 1867 O'Reilly was placed in chains and marched off to the convict ship Hougoumont, along with 61 other Fenian prisoners and 218 common criminals, for transportation to the British colony of Western Australia.

Midway through the voyage, O'Reilly and another prisoner John Flood, established a handwritten newspaper called The Wild Goose which contained poetry, stories and anecdotes from members of the ship's convict fraternity. Seven editions were produced, and the single copy of the original set survives and is held in the State Library of New South Wales collection. The Hougoumont's passage was the last convict ship transport to Western Australia.

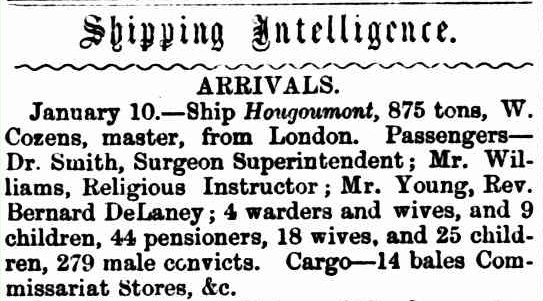
News clipping from the Perth Gazette and West Australian Times, 17 January 1868, announcing the arrival of the Hougoumont in Fremantle

After arriving in Fremantle on 9 January 1868, O'Reilly was admitted to the Convict Establishment (now Fremantle Prison), but after a month he was transferred to Bunbury. He was assigned to a party of convicts tasked with building the Bunbury–Busselton road.

One day while clearing the bush in Bunbury to make way for a new road, O'Reilly refused to be a member of a party of a convict road gang ordered to cut down a huge tuart tree standing in the way of the new road. O'Reilly's action to save the tree soon came to the attention of the warder's wife Selina. And it wasn't too long before the word had spread throughout the district that a convict had disobeyed orders. Eventually, the tree was saved and the new road given a slight curve around the tree.

O'Reilly quickly developed a good relationship with his warder Henry Woodman, and was appointed probationary convict constable. As assistant to the warder, he did record and account keeping, ordering of stores, and other minor administrative duties. He was frequently used as a messenger, which required him to travel regularly between the work camp and the district convict prison in Bunbury. The warder apparently used O'Reilly to maintain contact with his family, for the prisoner became a regular visitor to the Woodman family home, and at some point he began a romantic liaison with Woodman's daughter Jessie. This ended badly, at least for O'Reilly; he wrote poetry expressing his agony of mind, and hints at romantic causes. On 27 December 1868 O'Reilly attempted suicide by cutting the veins of his left arm. After falling into a faint from loss of blood, he was discovered by another convict, and his life was saved.

According to a letter discovered in 2015, Jessie Woodman became pregnant with O'Reilly's child (this has been said to be a factor in O'Reilly's suicide attempt). Most accounts say that Woodman had the child after O'Reilly escaped and it died shortly after. Woodman's father Henry eventually found out about the relationship and married Jessie off to local 22-year-old George Pickersgill in March 1869. (O'Reilly was either still hiding from authorities or on his way to America during this time.)

==== Escape ====
While in Bunbury, O'Reilly formed a strong friendship with the local Roman Catholic priest, Father Patrick McCabe. Late in 1868, McCabe offered to arrange for O'Reilly to escape the colony. By February McCabe's plan was ready for execution. On 18 February 1869 O'Reilly absconded from his work party and met up with James Maguire, a local settler from the town of Dardanup. Together they rode to Geographe Bay where a rowboat was waiting for them. (Note: Despite many authors stating that O'Reilly and the rescue party departed from the Collie River near Picton, O'Reilly's account (the only available account of the escape), does not confirm this.)

O'Reilly hid in the dunes, awaiting the departure from Bunbury of the American whaling ship Vigilant which Father McCabe had arranged would take him on board. The ship was sighted the next day, and the party rowed out to it, but the captain reneged on the agreement, and the Vigilant sailed off without acknowledging the people in the rowboat. O'Reilly had to return to the shore and hide again while his friends tried to make arrangements with another ship. After two weeks, they succeeded in making a deal with the captain of the American whaler Gazelle. O'Reilly and his friends met the Gazelle 4.8 kilometres (3 mi) out to sea on 2 March, and he was taken on board. With him was a ticket of leave convict named Martin Bowman (alias for Thomas Henderson), who had heard of the intended escape. He had blackmailed the conspirators into allowing him to join O'Reilly.

While on the Gazelle, O'Reilly became friends with the first mate of the ship Henry Hathaway, and they remained good friends until O'Reilly's death. Hathaway saved O'Reilly's life when, while whaling on a lifeboat near the Gazelle, a wave hit the boat and O'Reilly was knocked unconscious. Hathaway saved his life by performing cardiopulmonary resuscitation.

McCabe had arranged for the Gazelle to take O'Reilly only as far as Java, but adverse weather prevented the ship's finding safe passage through the Sunda Strait. The captain decided to sail for Rodrigues, Mauritius, at that time a British colony. As soon as the Gazelle arrived at Rodrigues, it was boarded by a magistrate and a contingent of police, who claimed to have information that the Gazelle carried an escaped convict from Western Australia, and demanded that he be given up. The crew gave up Bowman, but denied having O'Reilly on board. The Gazelle's next port of call was to be Saint Helena, another British colony. The captain recommended that O'Reilly transfer to another ship before then.

On 29 July the Gazelle met the American cargo vessel Sapphire on the high seas and O'Reilly changed ships. The Sapphire arrived at Liverpool on 13 October and O'Reilly transferred to another American ship, the Bombay. The Bombay docked in Philadelphia on 23 November 1869 where O'Reilly was enthusiastically welcomed by Irish compatriots.

Shortly after O'Reilly arrived in Philadelphia he went to New York where he was invited to deliver a lecture in the Cooper Institute which he delivered on 16 December 1869. While there he recounted details of the escape. O'Reilly quickly realised that New York did not offer any field for his ambitions and he was advised to move to Boston, which he did, arriving there on 2 January 1870.

=== 1870–1890: Writing and journalism career ===
==== 1870–1874: Early years, Fenian invasion of Canada and Songs From the Southern Seas ====
O'Reilly settled in Charlestown, a neighbourhood in Boston, which had a large Irish community. He gave his first lecture in the United States on 31 January 1870 on "England's Political Prisoners". The lecture was a success and O'Reilly was invited to repeat it in Salem, Providence and other areas. A bit later that year he was given the position as a reporter with The Pilot.

In June 1870 O'Reilly travelled to Canada, to cover the Fenian Invasion of Canada, where he met General John O'Neill. O'Reilly was on the front line at every event during the failed invasion including O'Neill's arrest. The coverage was O'Reilly's first major work on The Pilot.

== Marriage and family ==
On August 15, 1872, O'Reilly married Mary Murphy (1850–1897), a journalist who wrote for the Young Crusader under the name of Agnes Smiley. They had four daughters: Mary, Eliza, Agnes and Blanid. Their eldest daughter, Mary Boyle O'Reilly, was a journalist and war correspondent before and during World War I. The third daughter, Agnes O'Reilly, went on to marry the philosopher William Ernest Hocking soon after he earned his PhD from Harvard University, where he would later teach. A decade later when they returned to Cambridge, Agnes started an open-air school that developed into Shady Hill School. It continues today near Harvard Square. Their three children were Richard, Joan, and Hester.

== Catalpa rescue ==
In 1875 John Devoy sought O'Reilly's advice on how the Clan na Gael might rescue the six military Fenians serving time in Western Australia. The first plan was to storm Fremantle Prison and rescue the Fenians by force of arms; O'Reilly rejected that. He suggested that a rescue party pick up the escapees according to a prearranged plan. He also recommended their buying a whaling ship for the purpose, as it could have an appearance of legitimate business in Fremantle. O'Reilly's plan was adopted, and ultimately led to the Catalpa rescue.

The escape was successful and O'Reilly was given the news of the escape in June 1876.

== Poetry ==
O'Reilly published his first book of poems, Songs from the Southern Seas, in 1873. Over the next fifteen years, he published three collections of poetry, a novel, and a treatise on health and exercise. His poetry was extremely popular and he was often commissioned to write poems for important commemorative occasions. By the late twentieth century, most of his earlier work was dismissed as popular verse, but some of his later, more introspective poetry, such as his best-known poem, The Cry of the Dreamer, is still highly regarded.

At the dedication for the memorial to Crispus Attucks on 14 November 1888, O'Reilly read his poem dedicated to Attucks aloud.

In his later years O'Reilly became prone to illness and suffered from bouts of insomnia. He published his final poem, The Useless Ones, in The Pilot on 1 February 1890.

== Athletics ==
O'Reilly was an amateur boxer and also competed in fencing, rowing, canoeing, and hurling. In 1879, he helped found the Irish Athletic Club of Boston, which held annual hurling competitions. In 1888, his Ethics of Boxing and Manly Sport was published.

O'Reilly advocated for the creating a social club similar to the New York Athletic Club in Boston. In January 1887, a meeting was held to discuss his proposal and O'Reilly and fifteen others were appointed to a committee to investigate the feasibility of such an organization. The committee reported favorably and the Boston Athletic Association was officially organized on March 15, 1887, with O'Reilly elected to its governing committee.

== Death ==
On August 9, 1890, O'Reilly took an early boat to his residence in Hull, Massachusetts. He had been suffering from bouts of insomnia during this time. That evening he took a long walk with his brother-in-law John R. Murphy hoping that physical fatigue would induce the needed sleep.

Later on that night he took some of his wife's sleeping medicine, which contained chloral hydrate.

On the morning of 10 August around 2 to 3 a.m. his wife woke up and found O'Reilly sitting in a chair, with one hand resting on the table near a book, and a cigar in the other. O'Reilly was found to be unconscious. His wife sent a servant for the family's physician Dr Litchfield, He spent nearly an hour trying to revive him, but O'Reilly died shortly before 5 a.m. Public announcements attributed O'Reilly's death to heart failure, but the official death register claims "accidental poisoning".

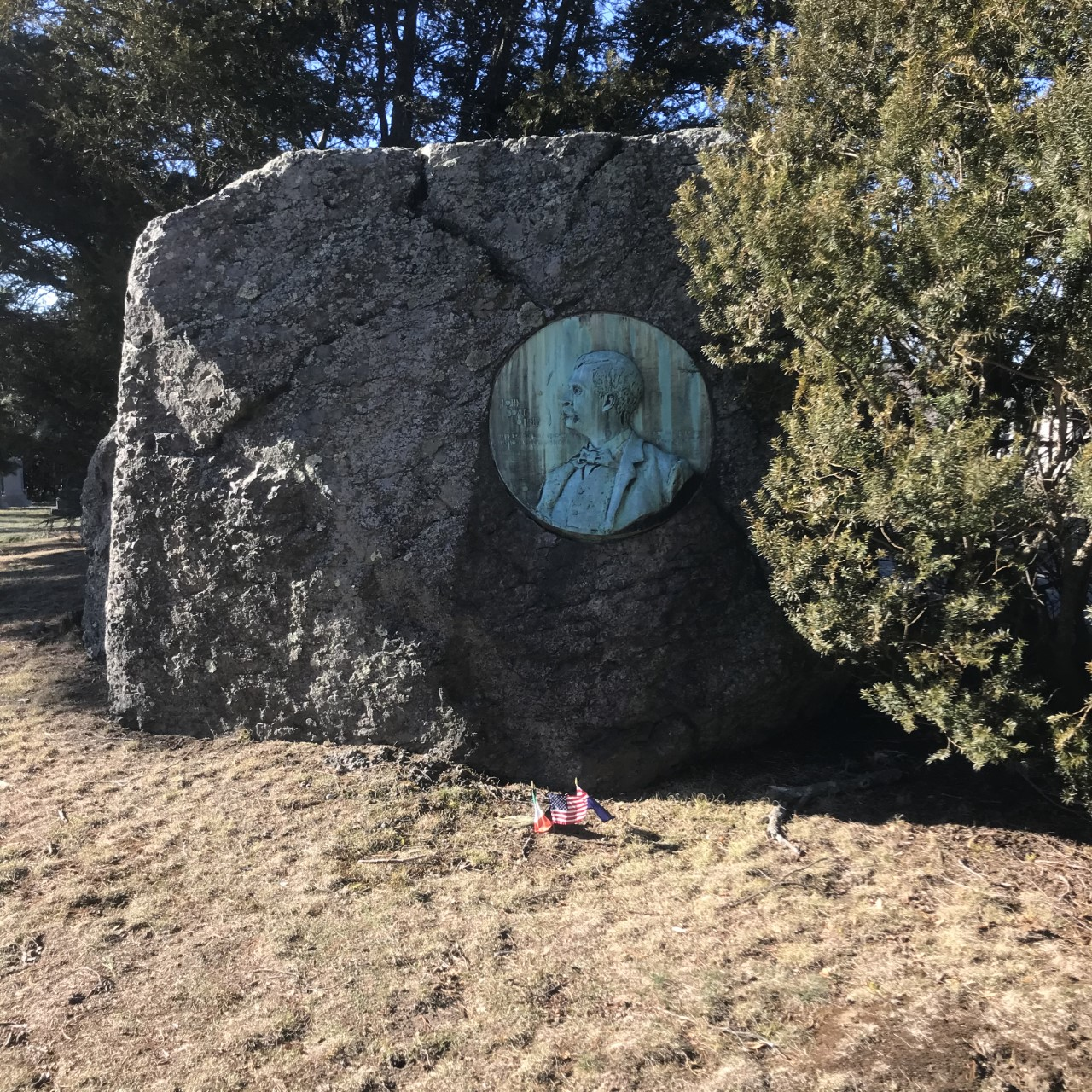
John Boyle O'Reilly Tombstone Holyhood Cemetery Brookline Massachusetts USA

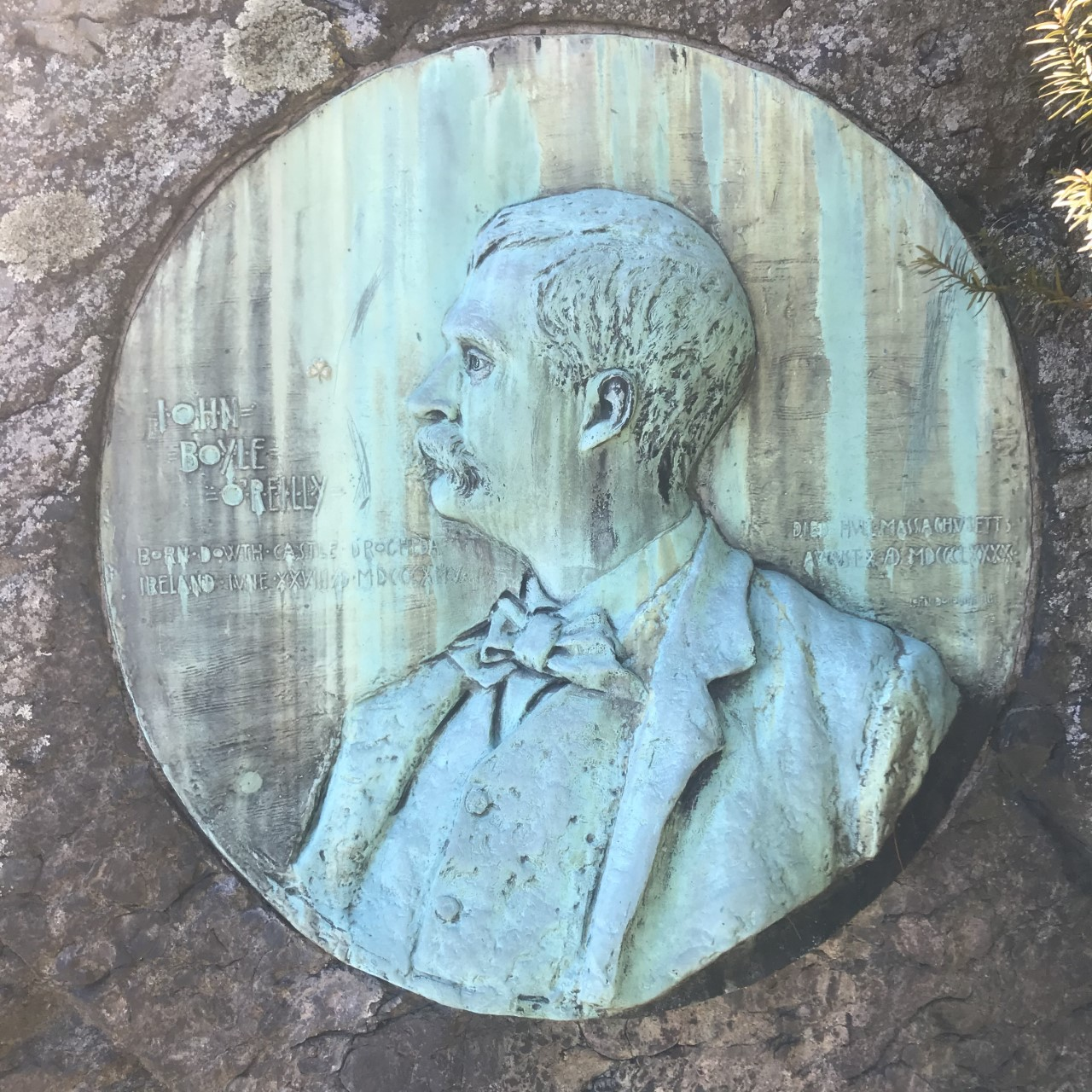
John Boyle O'Reilly Tombstone Plaque Close-up Holyhood Cemetery Brookline Massachusetts USA

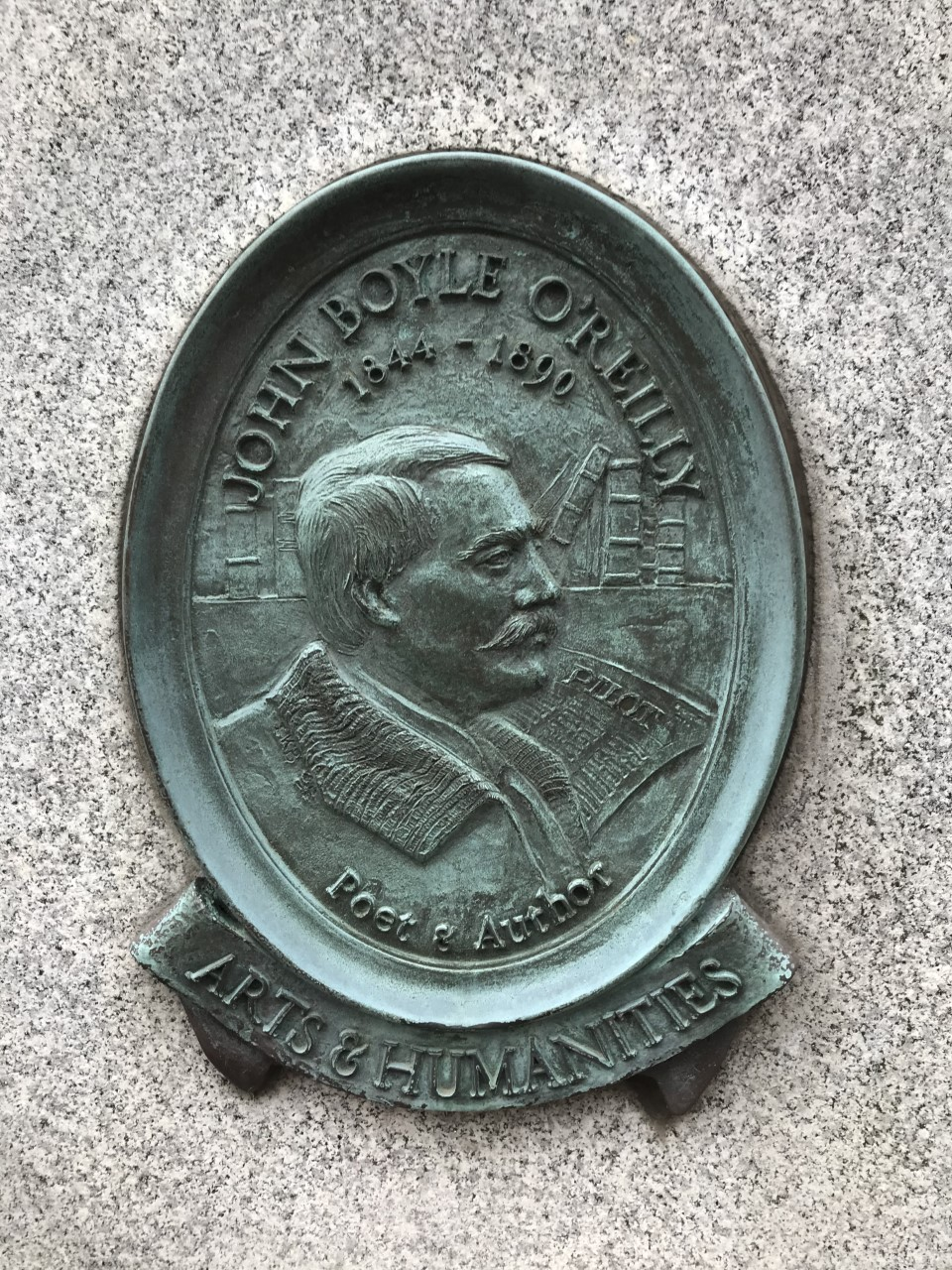
The John Boyle O'Reilly Plaque is one of several honoring past prominent residents of Charlestown Massachusetts. It is located in City Square Park.

=== Grief and tributes ===
O'Reilly's sudden death received an outpouring of grief and tributes from the Boston community and also globally, The Pilot published a full biography of his life in their 16 August edition. Cardinal James Gibbons said upon hearing the news,

It is a public calamity—not only a loss to the country, but a loss to the Church, and to humanity in general.

— Cardinal James Gibbons

Grover Cleveland wrote,

I have heard with sincere regret that John Boyle O'Reilly is dead. I regarded him as a strong and able man, entirely devoted to any cause he espoused, unselfish in his activity, true and warm in his friendship, and patriotic in his enthusiasm.

— Grover Cleveland

George Frisbie Hoar sent a telegram to O'Reilly's wife saying,

Accept my profound sympathy in your great loss and the great public loss. Your husband combined, as no other man, some of the noblest qualities of the Irishman and the American.

— George Frisbie Hoar

His parish priest Reverend J. W. McMahon of St. Mary's Church, Charlestown said,

I have always had a great admiration for the man ever since he came to my parish as a member. As for his career before that time that, too, commands my respect and admiration. He was a single-minded, open-hearted man—a man who loved liberty for itself, and who wished everybody to have a fair chance. He was a good husband, a good father, a good Catholic and a good man.

— Reverend J. W. McMahon

Oliver Wendell Holmes Jr. wrote,

John Boyle O'Reilly was a man of heroic mold and nature; brave, adventurous, patriotic, enthusiastic, with the perfervidum ingenium, which belongs quite as much to the Irish as to the Scotch. We have been proud of him as an adopted citizen, feeling always that his native land could ill spare so noble a son. His poems show what he might have been had he devoted himself to letters. His higher claim is that he was a true and courageous lover of his country and of his fellow, men.

— Oliver Wendell Holmes

Boston mayor Thomas N. Hart along with many other identities in Boston and Ireland also paid tribute.

=== Funeral and memorial service ===
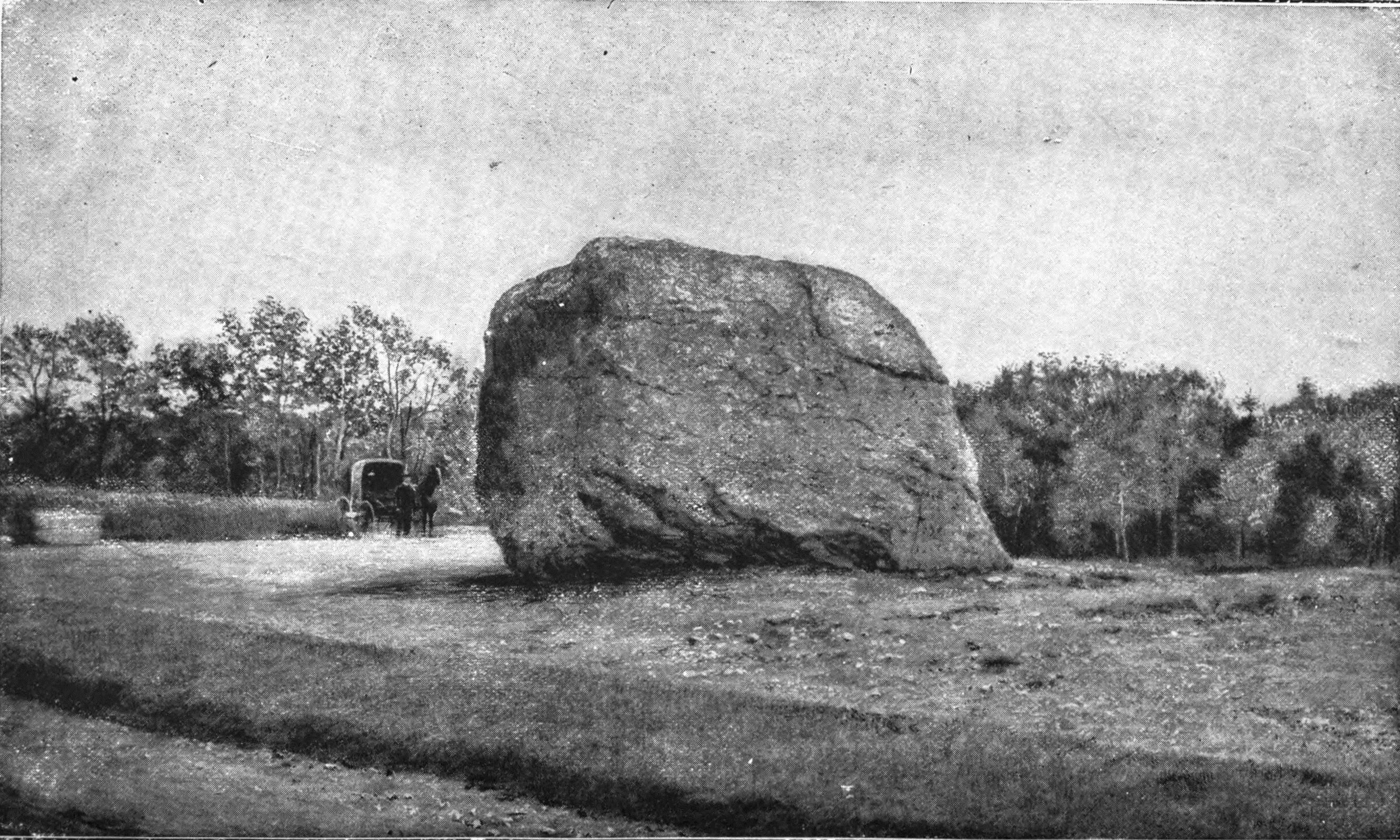
O'Reilly's grave, c. 1891.

His funeral on 13 August held at St Mary's Church in Charlestown was attended by thousands. The streets near the church were lined with mourners. The bearers were O'Donovan Rossa, Jeremiah O'Donovan, Michael Fitzgerald, James A. Wrenn, Capt. Lawrence O'Brien, and Denis Cashman. His wife did not attend the funeral due to grief and was "unable to leave her bed."

On 2 September a public memorial service was held at Tremont Temple in Boston, attended by dozens. The speakers included Mayor Thomas Hart, Charles Levi Woodbury (son of Levi Woodbury), Rev William Byrne. Charles H. Taylor, Benjamin Butler, Thomas Wentworth Higginson, Edwin Walker and Patrick Collins.

O'Reilly was originally buried at Calvary Cemetery in Roxbury, but in November 1890 his remains were exhumed and moved to Holyhood Cemetery in Brookline. His grave is near that of Patrick Collins.

== Legacy and honours ==
In 1891, James Jeffrey Roche, O'Reilly's assistant editor of the Boston Pilot, published a biography of O'Reilly's life titled Life of John Boyle O'Reilly.

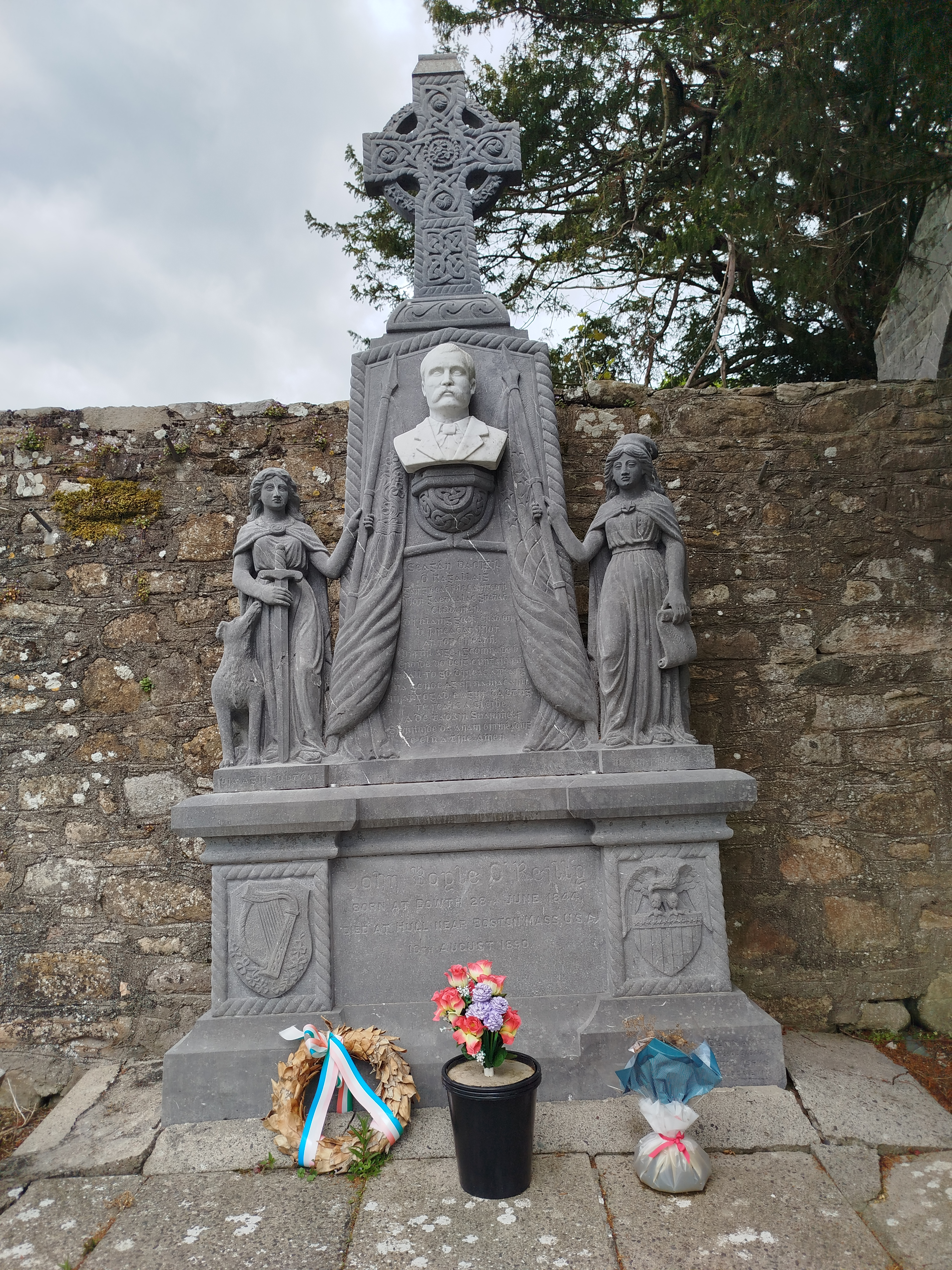
Memorial in his home village, Dowth Abbey, Ireland.

O'Reilly became one of the most famous and respected journalists and writers in the United States. His civil rights activism garnered a lot of attention at the time; in 1945 The Crisis described O'Reilly thus:

O'Reilly defended the oppressed negroes, as he had defended the oppressed Indians, as sincerely and zealously as he had all his life defended the oppressed of his own race. It was morally impossible for him to do otherwise.

On 20 June 1896 (nearly a week before what would have been his 52nd birthday), a multi-figure bronze sculpture of O'Reilly was unveiled, then-President Grover Cleveland gave a speech at the event.

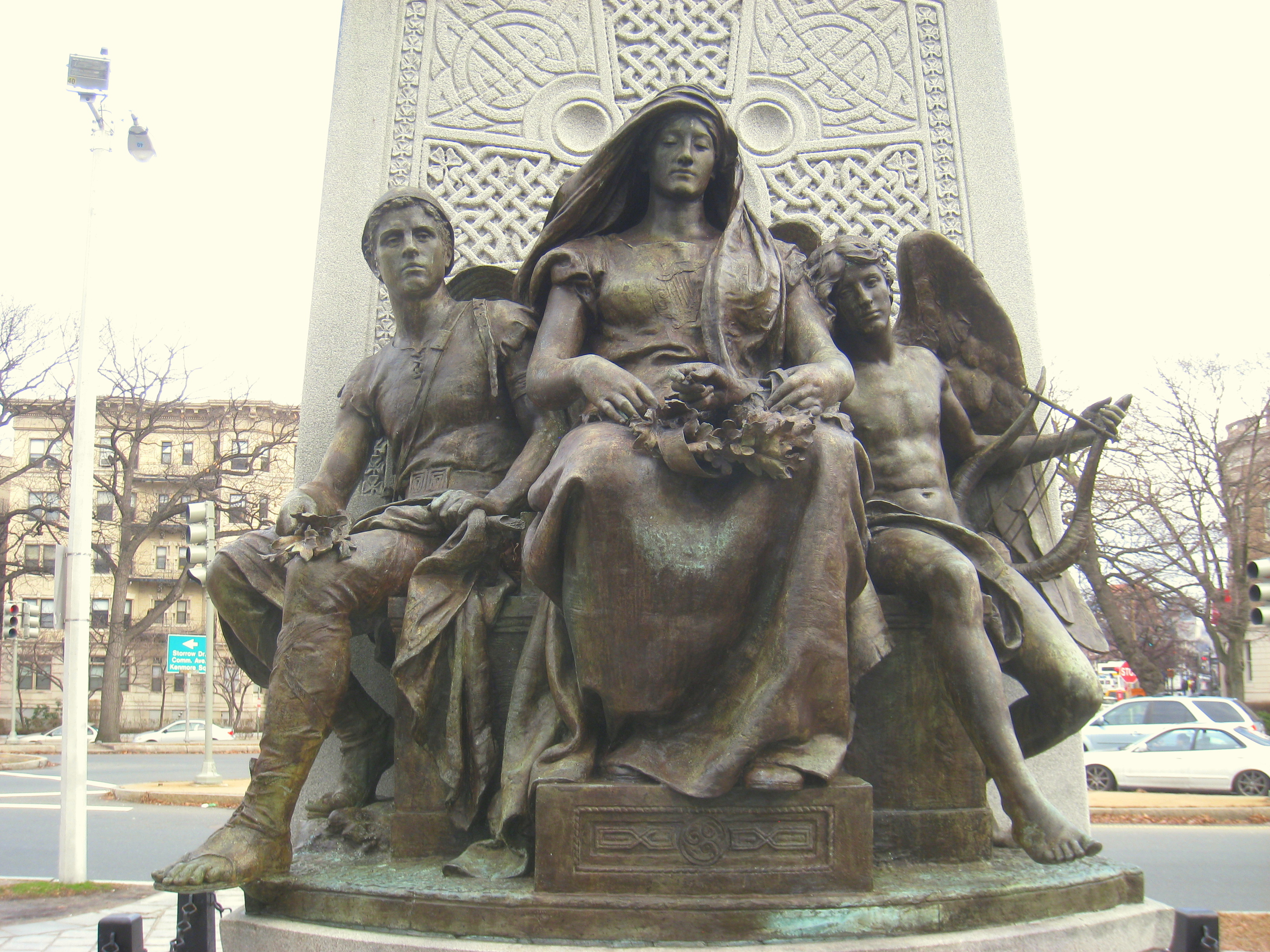
John Boyle O'Reilly monument, Boston, by Daniel Chester French, 1896

O'Reilly's admirers included poets and politicians such as Walt Whitman, James Whitcomb Riley, Oscar Wilde, John F. Kennedy, Grover Cleveland and Oliver Wendell Holmes Jr.

The John Boyle O'Reilly Club opened in 1880 in Springfield, Massachusetts. They celebrated their 125th anniversary in 2005.

In the early 1900s, Boyle O'Reilly Terrace, an estate built on the north side of Drogheda, was named after him.

In 1903, a memorial was erected to him at Dowth Abbey, near his birthplace, Dowth Castle.

Author and historian Francis Russell included an essay about O'Reilly in his 1987 book "The Knave of Boston & Other Ambiguous Massachusetts Characters". Russell described how O'Reilly had gone from being perhaps the most famous Irishman in American in the late 1800s to a largely "forgotten poet" a century later.

Around the mid-1980s, Irish researcher Liam Barry (based in Bunbury) discovered the story of O'Reilly's escape and began to research more into it and promote the story. Before his death in 2015 he published multiple books on O'Reilly and the Fenians.

Around 1987 The John Boyle O'Reilly Association of Bunbury, Western Australia was founded, Barry was one of the founding members.

In 2002 an interpretative display was opened for John Boyle O'Reilly, in Western Australia on the Leschenault Peninsula Conservation Park, from where he escaped to the United States.

In April 2011 The John Boyle O'Reilly Association was established in Netterville his ancestral home, near Drogheda, Ireland.

J.B. O'Reilly's pub in West Leederville, Western Australia is named after O'Reilly.

In 2019, a festival was held in Fremantle to commemorate the 150th anniversary of O'Reilly's escape titled the Moondyne Walk, where a series of different readers would read out a chapter of his 1879 novel Moondyne. The list of readers included former Western Australian premier Peter Dowding, epidemiologist Fiona Stanley, author and journalist Peter FitzSimons and actor Peter Rowsthorn.

== Pardon request ==
In 1999 then-Western Australian opposition leader, Geoff Gallop, made an unsuccessful request to British Prime Minister and friend Tony Blair to grant O'Reilly a pardon.

== Works ==
- Songs from the Southern Seas (1873) – a collection of poems
- Songs, Legends and Ballads (1878) – a collection of poems
- Moondyne (1879) – a novel based on his experiences as a convict in Western Australia
- The Statues in the Block (1881) – a collection of poems
- In Bohemia (1886) – a collection of poems
- The Ethics of Boxing and Manly Sport (1888) – a treatise on health and physical exercise, later republished as Athletics and Manly Sport
- Watchwords (1891) – released posthumously and was edited by Katherine E. Conway.
- Selected poems of John Boyle O'Reilly (1904)

== In popular culture ==
- O'Reilly is said to have been U.S. President John F. Kennedy's favourite poet.
- In 1913 Melbourne-based silent film company Lincoln-Cass Film Company produced Moondyne, a silent film based on O'Reilly's novel. It was released in September 1913.
- The song "Van Diemen's Land" on U2's Rattle and Hum (1988) album refers to and is dedicated to O'Reilly.
- The county Clare folk singer Sean Tyrrell has set a number of O'Reilly's poems to music. A trilogy was included on his 1994 album, Cry of a Dreamer.
- The musician and local historian Brendan Woods wrote The Catalpa, a play about the 1876 escape from Fremantle Prison. It premiered on 15 November 2006 to a sell-out audience at Fremantle Town Hall and ran until 25 November. The play was based on the diaries of Denis Cashman, with the poetry of John Boyle O'Reilly set to music and dance, supported by a five-part musical ensemble.
- Woods released a CD entitled: John Boyle O'Reilly & The Fenian Escape from Fremantle Gaol (2006).
- In 2016, the John Boyle O'Reilly Association of Bunbury made a short film based on O'Reilly's time waiting for the Vigilant to arrive titled In Search of the Vigilant. It was filmed in the Leschenault Peninsula and other parts of the Bunbury area. The 30-minute short film premiered in Bunbury on March 25, 2017.
- In 2017 Western Australian musician Latehorse (Shane Thomas) released a song about O'Reilly's escape titled A Dreamer Forever
- O'Reilly is featured as one of the main characters in the musical drama Toilers of the Sea: The Life of Joshua James.
- O'Reilly's mugshot is one of eight convicts featured on wine bottle labels for the Australian wine brand 19 Crimes.

== See also ==
- List of convicts transported to Australia

== General references ==
- Evans, Anthony G. (1997). Fanatic Heart: A Life of John Boyle O'Reilly 1844–1890. Nedlands, Western Australia: University of Western Australia Press. ISBN 1-875560-82-3.
- Kenneally, Ian (2011). From the Earth, a Cry: The story of John Boyle O'Reilly. Cork: Collins. ISBN 9781848891319. OCLC 751824202.
- Walsh, Francis Robert (1968). The 'Boston Pilot': A Newspaper For The Irish Immigrant, 1829-1908 (PhD). Boston University. OCLC 11803344.
