= The Wild Goose =

Hand-written newspaper

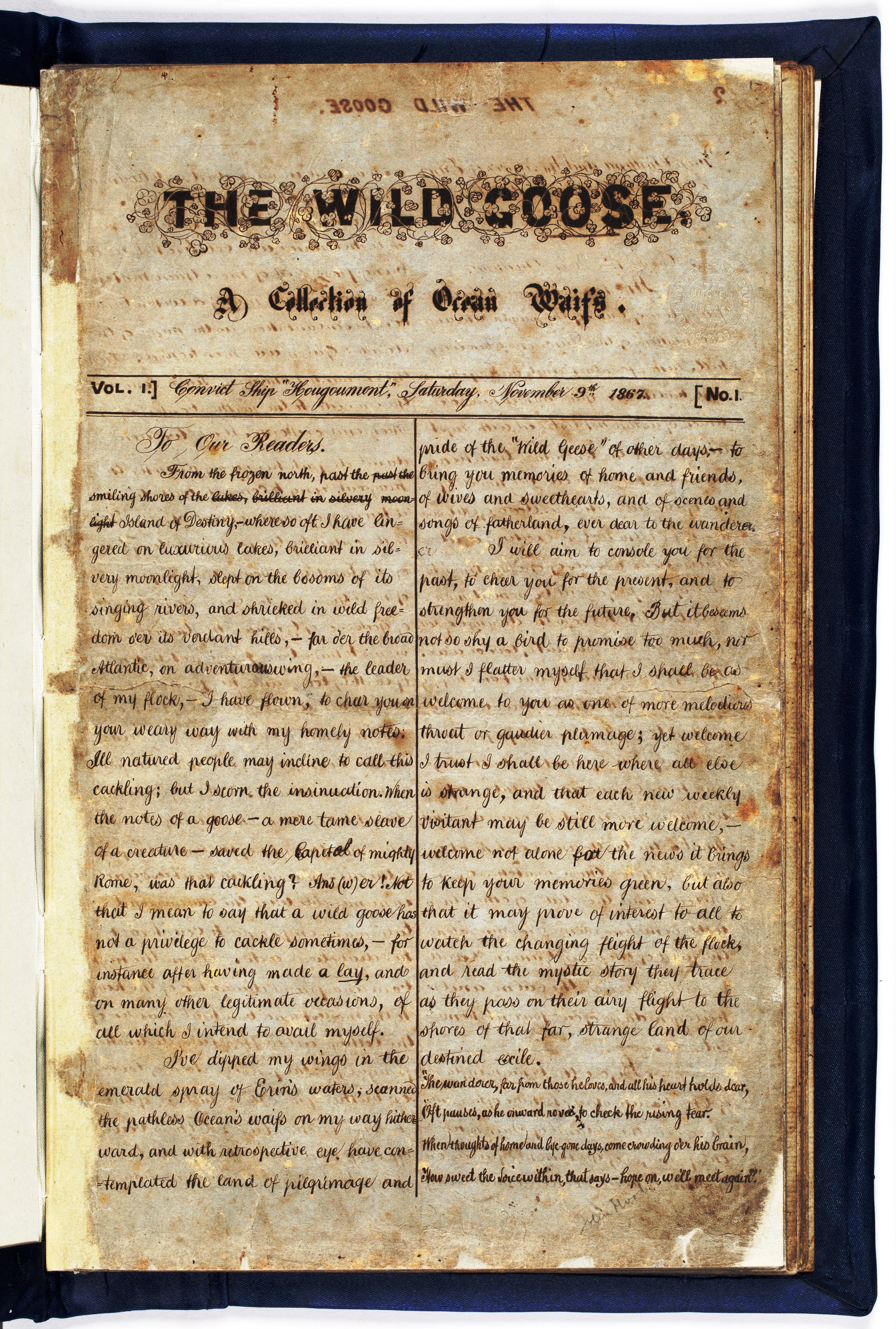
The Wild Goose Number 1, page 1

The Wild Goose: A Collection of Ocean Waifs was a hand-written newspaper created in late 1867 by Fenian prisoners aboard Hougoumont, the last ship to transport convicts to Australia.

Seven issues of the newspaper were produced, and each issue was carefully laid out and decorated by hand. Only one copy of each issue was made, which was then read to the convicts aloud. The aim was to provide entertainment and encouragement aboard the ship during its long and arduous voyage to Fremantle. The title refers to the Wild Geese: the Irish soldiers who had left to serve in continental European armies since the 16th century.

The major contributors were John Flood, John Boyle O'Reilly and John Sarsfield Casey. The documents provide insight into life aboard ship. The documents contain songs, stories, articles, advice, poems, and even comedy. In addition to the diaries of Denis Cashman and the journals of Casey and Thomas McCarthy Fennell, the journey of Hougoumont was well recorded.

One passage describes Australia and its history with more than a little sarcasm:

This great continent of the south, having been discovered by some Dutch skipper and his crew, somewhere between the 1st and 9th centuries of the Christian era, was, in consequence taken possession of by the government of Great Britain, in accordance with that just and equitable maxim, "What's yours is mine; what's mine is my own." That magnanimous government in the kindly exuberance of their feelings, have placed a large portion of that immense tract of country called Australia at our disposal. Generously defraying all expenses incurred on our way to it, and providing retreats for us there to secure us from the inclemency of the seasons…

O'Reilly penned several poems for the paper, including The Flying Dutchman and The Old School Clock.

All seven issues survive, and were passed by Flood's granddaughter to the State Library of New South Wales and have all been digitised and are available online.

On 9 September 2005, a memorial was unveiled at Rockingham beach to commemorate the Catalpa rescue. The memorial is a large statue of six wild geese.

== See also ==
- Flight of the Wild Geese
