= Hougoumont (ship) =

Last ship to send convicts to Australia

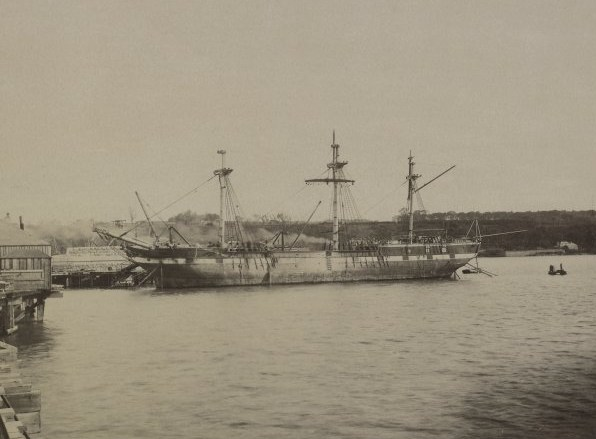
- Hougoumont in 1885 during the construction of the Forth Bridge in Scotland.

History

United Kingdom
- Name: Hougoumont
- Namesake: Château d'Hougomont
- Owner: Duncan Dunbar (junior)
- Launched: 1852

General characteristics
- Tons burthen: 875 bm
- Length: 165 ft 6 in (50.4 m) feet
- Beam: 34 ft (10 m)
- Depth of hold: 23 ft (7 m)

Hougoumont was the last convict ship to transport convicts to Australia.

A three-masted full-rigged ship of the type commonly known as a Blackwall Frigate, Hougoumont was constructed at Moulmein, Burma in 1852. The ship's original owner was Duncan Dunbar, a highly successful ship owner who entered the convict transport trade in the 1840s, providing nearly a third of the ships that transported convicts to Western Australia.

The nineteenth century author W. Clark Russell claimed to have served on the Hougoumont for three years.

Hougoumont was chartered by the French as a troop carrier during the Crimean War, during which time it was renamed Baraguey d'Hilliers after the French general Achille Baraguey d'Hilliers, as its original name was connected with the Battle of Waterloo and would have been offensive to the French. After the Crimean War ended in 1856, it was renamed Hougoumont.

In the 1860s, the Emigration Commission accepted a tender for Hougoumont to carry government-assisted emigrants to Australia. In September 1863, ten men and five women were removed from the ship to the St Georges infirmary, Wapping, diagnosed with "Insanity". Several were later transferred to the Colney Hatch Asylum.

On 9 June 1866 the vessel began a voyage from Plymouth to Port Adelaide, carrying 335 emigrants. It arrived on 16 September.

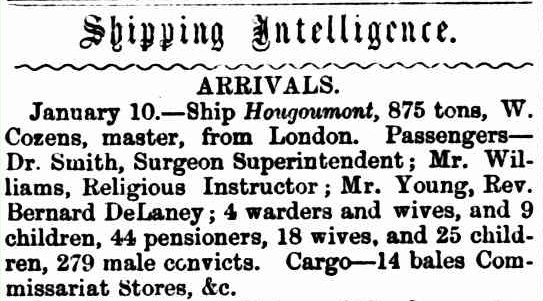
News clipping from the Perth Gazette and West Australian Times, 17 January 1868, announcing the arrival of the Hougoumont in Fremantle

Hougoumont's most famous voyage occurred in 1867, after it was chartered to transport convicts to Western Australia in what was to be the last convict transport voyage to Australia. By this time, it was owned by Luscombe of London. A number of convicts boarded the ship at Sheerness, Kent, on 30 September. It then sailed along the south coast of England to Portland, where more convicts were boarded. It departed Portsmouth on 12 October 1867 with 280 convicts and 108 passengers on board. Most of the passengers were pensioner guards and their families. The ship's captain was William Cozens and the surgeon-superintendent was Dr William Smith. After a largely uneventful voyage of 89 days, during which time one convict died, Hougoumont docked at Fremantle, Western Australia on 10 January 1868.

Amongst the convicts were 62 Fenian political prisoners, transported for their part in the Fenian Rising of 1867. About 17 of these were military Fenians. The transportation of political prisoners contravened the agreement between the United Kingdom and Western Australia, and news of their impending arrival caused panic in Western Australia. The fact that military Fenians were transported was also highly unusual, given the British Government's previous firm policy not to transport military prisoners.

The presence of Fenians amongst the convicts meant that there were many more literate convicts on board than was usual for such a voyage. Consequently, a number of journals of the voyage are extant: that of Denis Cashman has been known of for many years, and that of John Casey and the memoirs of Thomas McCarthy Fennell have recently been discovered and published. Numerous letters survive, and many articles about the voyage were later written by Fenians who went on to become journalists, such as John Boyle O'Reilly. Also, during the voyage a number of the Fenians entertained themselves by producing seven editions of a shipboard newspaper entitled The Wild Goose, which survive in the State Library of New South Wales.

Little is known of Hougoumont's later service, but there are records of emigrants arriving in Melbourne on board Hougoumont in 1869. The ship was still listed in Lloyd's Register in 1883, but is not in the 1889/90 volume.

In the 1880s Hougoumont was used as a storage vessel during the building of the Forth Bridge. It was used as a hospital ship in the Firth of Forth in the mid-1880s for smallpox sufferers, with numerous records in the National Records of Scotland listing it as such as place of death.

Many pictures purporting to be "the" Hougoumont are in fact of a later steel four-masted barque also named Hougomont, 2428 tons, built at Greenock in 1897, and hulked at Stenhouse Bay in South Australia in 1932.

== See also ==
Convicts transported on board Hougoumont include:

- Thomas Berwick
- John Boyle O'Reilly
- James Wilson (Irish Nationalist)
- Thomas McCarthy Fennell
- Joseph Nunan
- Hugh Francis Brophy
- John Flood (Fenian)
- Robert Reid

For other convict ship voyages to Western Australia:

- List of convict ship voyages to Western Australia.
