= Thomas McCarthy Fennell =

Political prisoner transported to Western Australia

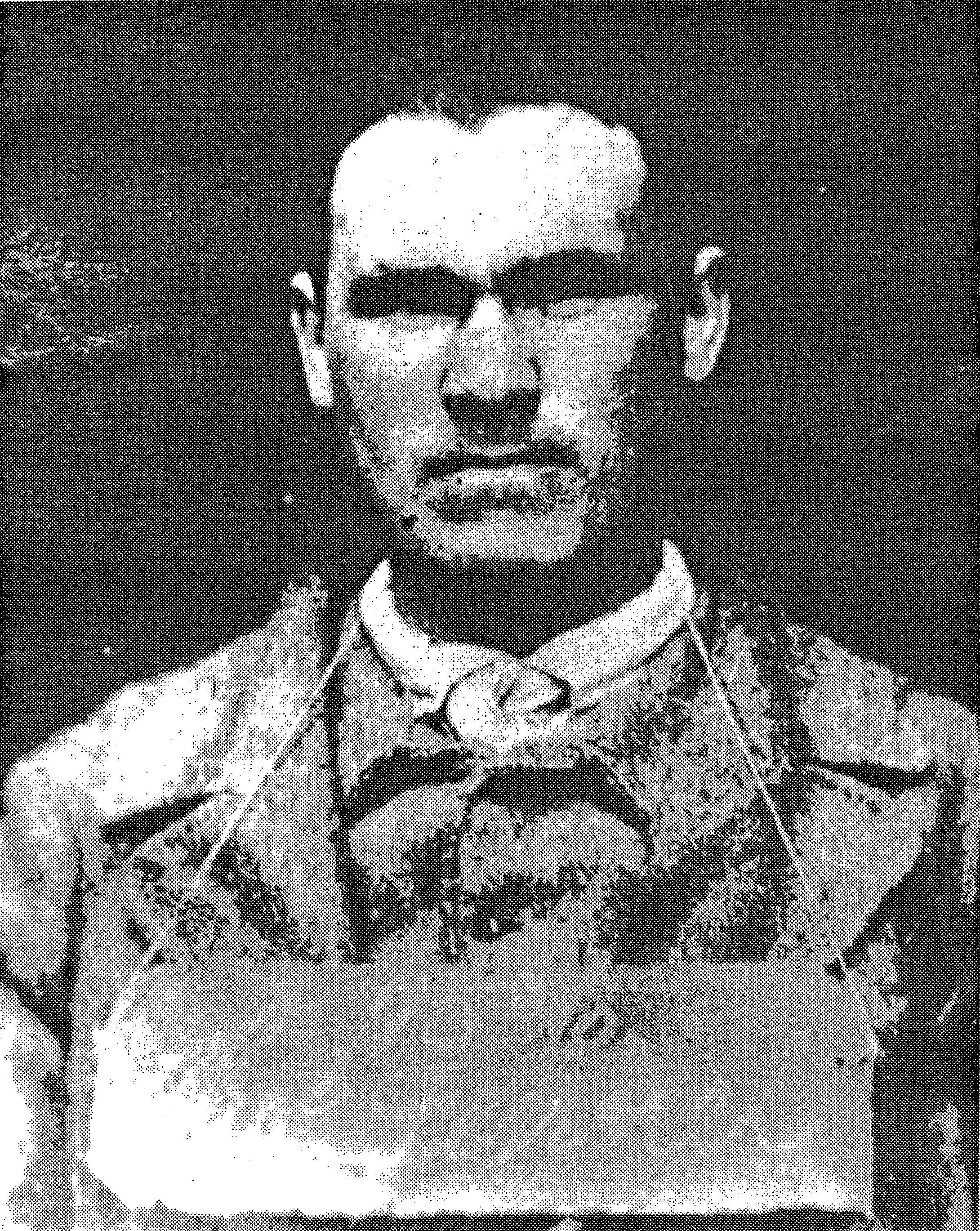
- Thomas McCarthy Fennell, Mountjoy Prison, 1866
- Born: 22 December 1841; County Clare, Ireland
- Died: 23 February 1914 (aged 72); Elmira, New York, USA
- Spouse: Margaret Collins (m.1874–1914; his death)
- Children: 4

Thomas McCarthy Fennell (22 December 1841 – 23 February 1914) was a Fenian political prisoner transported as a convict to colonial Western Australia.

Born in County Clare, Ireland in 1841, Fennell was just four years old when the Great Famine struck. Nonetheless he received a good education, attending either a Catholic school or a national school, and he learned to speak Irish at home.

== Fenians ==
In 1863, Fennell became one of the first Fenians recruited from County Clare; he then helped recruit and organize a group of men in preparation for the Fenian Rising. On 5 March 1867, six Fenians men entered the Kilbaha coastguard station, and demanded the station's arms "in the name of the Irish Republic". A scuffle ensued, and Fennell was shot through the hip and testicle. The group retreated, and Fennell was treated for his injuries. He was arrested three days later. Tried for treason in the Clare Assizes, on 15 July 1867 he was found guilty and sentenced to ten years' penal labour. Initially he was lodged at Mountjoy Prison, a clearinghouse for political prisoners; later he was transferred to Portland prison.

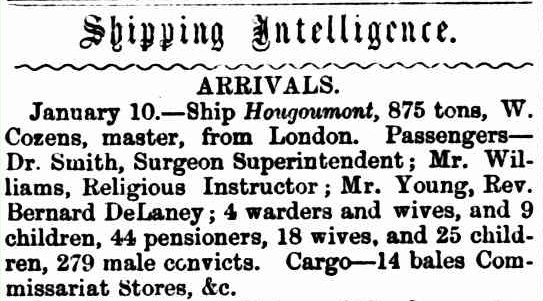
News clipping from the Perth Gazette and West Australian Times, 17 January 1868, announcing the arrival of Hougoumont in Fremantle

In October 1867, he was put on board Hougoumont, a convict ship bound for Western Australia. Hougoumont departed from Portland on 12 October 1867 and arrived at Fremantle on 9 January 1868. It was the last convict ship to transport prisoners to Australia.

== Pardon ==
Fennell remained in the Western Australian penal system until March 1871, when he received a conditional pardon under a Royal Clemency announced by William Ewart Gladstone the previous December. Banned from returning to the United Kingdom, Fennell sailed for New Zealand in May 1871. On arrival, he was immediately arrested and deported to New South Wales, as New Zealand had laws restricting immigration of ex-convicts. New South Wales had similar laws, but did not arrest him, presumably because he made known his intention of emigrating to the United States. He sailed for San Francisco on board City of Melbourne. In 1872 he went to Connecticut. While there, he was approached by John Devoy about plans to rescue the military Fenians still in Western Australia's penal system. Fennell's suggestion was ultimately implemented in the Catalpa rescue. Although Devoy and the other Irish-Americans always credited Fennell with the original idea, Fennell himself claimed that the idea came from "two gentlemen in Australia whose names it would not be well to mention, and a Rev'd gentleman now out west in this country".

In 1874, Fennell married Margaret Collins, and they moved to Elmira, New York. Fennell established himself as the operator of the Commercial Hotel and also served as the local agent for the Cunard Line. Additionally, he held positions as a city park commissioner and Elmira's first Superintendent of Public Works. Fennell actively contributed to fundraising efforts for various Irish causes, including the Kilrush monument dedicated to the Manchester Martyrs. Fennell's first son, Thomas Francis Fennell was the head football coach at Penn State from 1904 to 1908.

== Death ==
Fennell died on 23 February 1914 after a brief illness. He was survived by his wife and three children.

== General references ==
- Fennell, Thomas McCarthy (2000). Fennell, Philip; King, Marie (eds.). Voyage of the Hougoumont and Life at Fremantle: The Story of an Irish Rebel. New York: Xlibris. ISBN 0-7388-5903-6. OCLC 47245171.
