= Hull Shore Drive and Nantasket Avenue =

Historic district in Massachusetts, United States

- Hull Shore Drive, Nantasket Avenue, Metropolitan Park System of Greater Boston MPS
- U.S. National Register of Historic Places
- U.S. Historic district
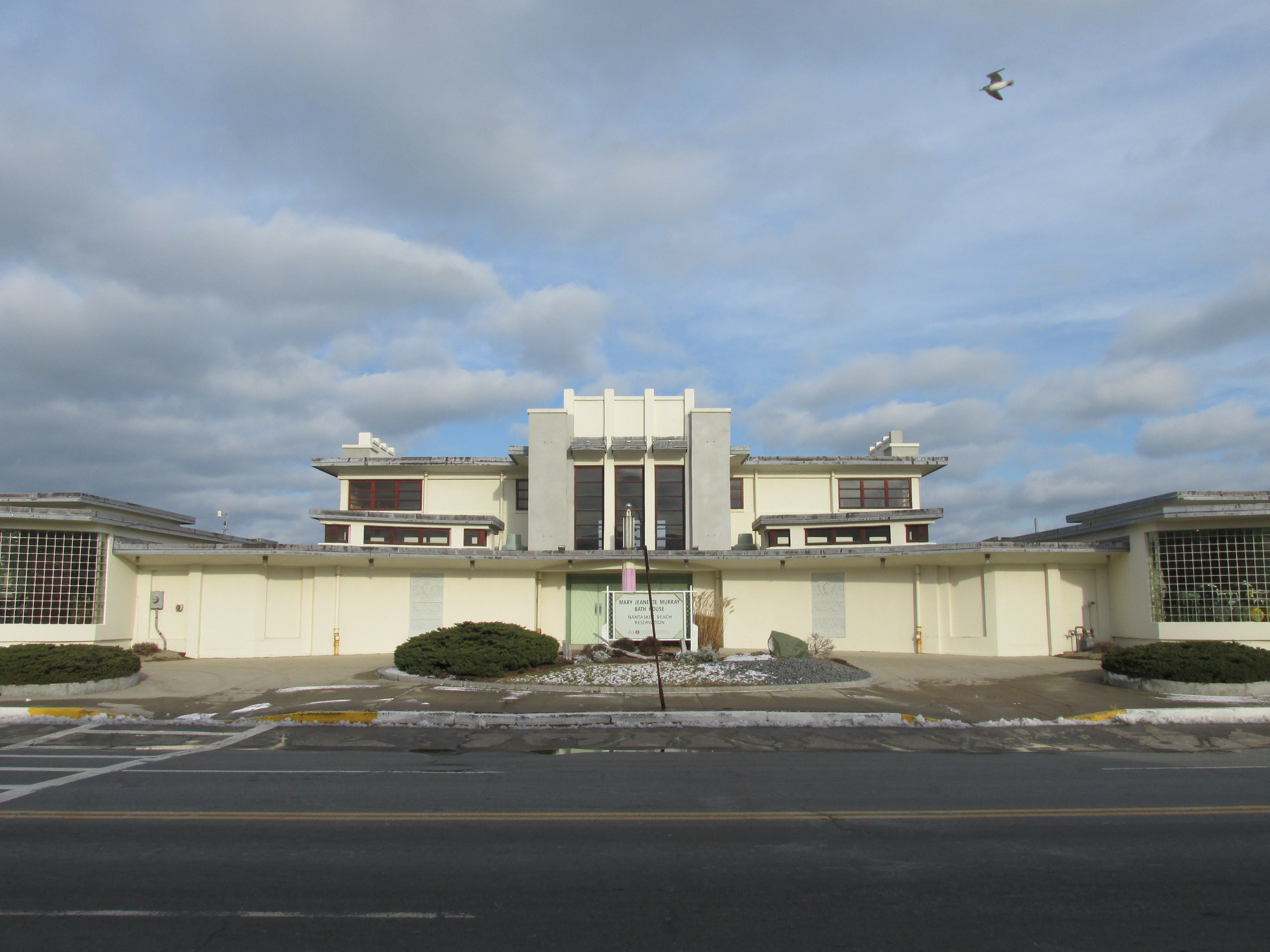
- Mary Jeanette Murray Bath House

- Location within Massachusetts Location within the United States
- Location: Hull, Massachusetts
- Coordinates: 42°16′20″N 70°51′39″W
- Area: 6.5 acres (2.6 ha)
- MPS: Metropolitan Park System of Greater Boston MPS
- NRHP reference No.: 03001470
- Added to NRHP: January 21, 2004

Hull Shore Drive and Nantasket Avenue are a historic coastal parkway in Hull, Massachusetts. Nantasket Avenue, designated as part of Route 228, is the main road through the town of Hull. Hull Shore Drive is a short segment of the road, near the Nantasket Beach Reservation at the southern end of the Hull peninsula. A 1.25-mile (2.01 km) section of the roads (the portion adjoining Nantasket Beach) was added to the National Register of Historic Places in 2004.

== Route description ==
Nantasket Avenue begins in Hingham and Cohasset, at a four-way junction with Rockland Street (west), Jerusalem Road (east), and Hull Street (south). Hull Street and Nantasket Avenue are designated Massachusetts Route 228, and the road forms the town line between Hingham and Cohasset until it crosses Straits Pond Dam into Hull just north of the junction. It proceeds generally north, passing through Hull's hilly southern section before reaching its peninsular portion. It is flanked on its eastern side by Nantasket Beach until it reaches a junction with Hull Shore Drive, marking the end of Route 228. At that point George Washington Boulevard runs southwest, and Hull Shore Drive and Nantasket Avenue begin a stretch where Hull Shore Drive is one-way heading north and Nantasket Avenue is one-way heading south, with Hull Shore Drive to the east. At Water Street, near the northern end of the Nantasket Beach Reservation, Hull Shore Drive ends, and the northbound lanes are marked Nantasket Avenue as well. The divided road comes to an end at Phipps Street, and Nantasket Avenue continues north, up the central spine of the Hull Peninsula.

The road next skirts around the southwestern part of the hill Point Allerton neighborhood, before turning west, following the bend in the peninsula near the Hull Yacht Club. After a narrow stretch of the peninsula, it skirts around the north side of Telegraph Hill on which Fort Revere is located, before reaching its end at a three-way junction with Main Street.

== See also ==
- National Register of Historic Places listings in Plymouth County, Massachusetts
