= Kenny Greer =

American baseball player (born 1967)

- Pitcher
- Born: May 12, 1967 (age 59); Boston, Massachusetts, U.S.
- Batted: Right Threw: Right

MLB debut
- September 29, 1993, for the New York Mets

Last MLB appearance
- July 17, 1995, for the San Francisco Giants

MLB statistics
- Games pitched: 9
- Win–loss record: 1–2
- Earned run average: 4.85
- Strikeouts: 9
- Stats at Baseball Reference

Teams
- New York Mets (1993); San Francisco Giants (1995)

Kenneth William Greer (born May 12, 1967) is an American former Major League Baseball pitcher who played for the New York Mets in 1993 and the San Francisco Giants in 1995.

He played baseball at Hull High School in Hull, Massachusetts and for the UMass Minutemen. He was drafted by the New York Yankees in the 10th round of the 1988 Major League Baseball draft and played for the Yankees minor league affiliates from 1988 to 1993 before being traded to the Mets in exchange for Frank Tanana on September 17, 1993. 12 days later, Greer would make his debut on September 29 pitching an inning of relief in the process of earning his first and only win in his only appearance with the Mets. He would then sign with the San Francisco Giants on November 29, 1994 and would appear in 8 games with the team during the 1995 season, pitching 12 innings with 2 losses and a 5.25 ERA. After his stint with the Giants, Greer would play for the minor league affiliates for the Giants, Pittsburgh Pirates and Baltimore Orioles before retiring in 1997.

He has had a successful career as a recruiter in the energy industry.
