= On Broken Wings =

American metalcore band

- Origin: Hull, Massachusetts, U.S.
- Genres: Metalcore: hardcore punk; grindcore
- Years active: 2001–2007, 2008–present
- Labels: Eulogy, Artery
- Members: Jonathan Blake; Burke Medeiros; Robert DiAngelo; Kevin Garvin

On Broken Wings is an American metalcore band from Boston, Massachusetts, that formed in 2001. Often credited with pioneering the sound, and coining the term, of "moshcore" a term originally used by the band to describe their fusion of metal with elements of post-hardcore and hardcore breakdowns. AllMusic described their style as post-emo metalcore with elements of grindcore.

After the self-released Number One Beautiful EP, they caught the attention of Eulogy Recordings, where they released two albums over the next five years, 2003's Some of Us May Never See the World and 2005's It's All a Long Goodbye. In early 2007, On Broken Wings released an EP entitled Going Down, which contained the original Number One Beautiful EP as well as four new songs.

== Band members ==
=== Current ===
- Jonathon Blake – vocals (2001–present)
- Burke Medeiros – guitar (2001, 2003–present)
- Rob DiAngelo – guitar (2015–present))
- Kevin Garvin – drums (2001–present)
- Brendan Conners - bass

=== Former ===
- Eric D – vocals (live)
- Mike McMillen – guitar (2001–2016)
- Sean LaForce – guitar, vocals (2001–2003)
- Brendan Connors – guitar (live)
- Eric Ellis – guitar (live)
- Sean Murray – guitar (2008; live)
- John "Chuck" Lombardo – bass (2001–2004)
- Jerome McBride – bass (2005–2015)
- Johnny Earle – keyboards, samples (2001–2003)
- Josh "Skull" Long – drums (2008) (live)
- Stevie "Brutal" Murray – drums (live)

== Discography ==
=== Studio albums ===
- Some of Us May Never See the World (Eulogy Recordings, 2003)
- It's All a Long Goodbye (Eulogy Recordings, 2005)
- Going Down (Eulogy Recordings, 2007)
- Disintegrator (Artery Recordings, 2016)

=== EPs ===
- Number One Beautiful (Wonderdrug Recordings, 2001)
- Summer Solstice (self-released, 2012)
