= Pemberton Point =

Pemberton Point Windmill Point
- Peninsula
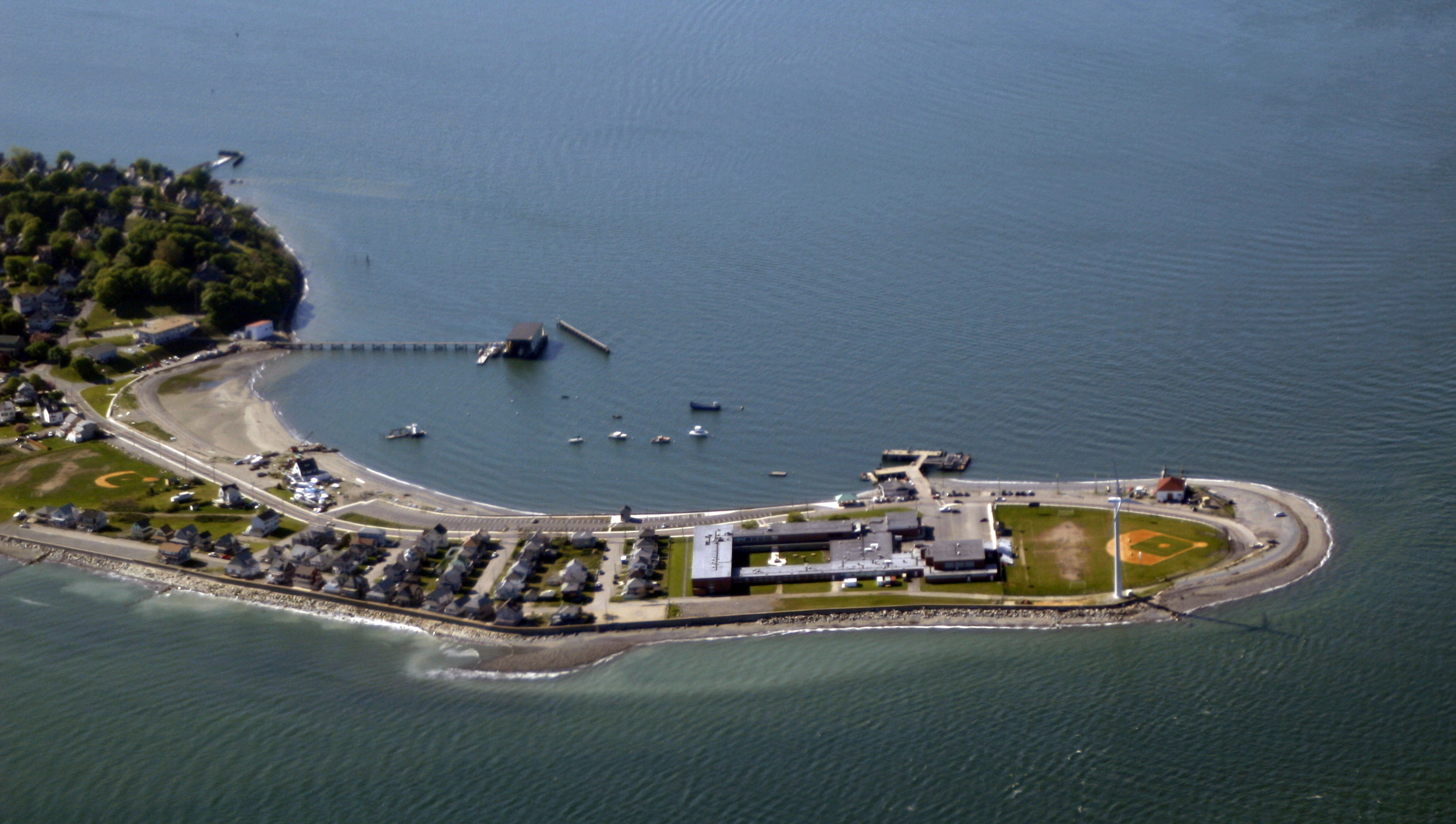
- Aerial view of Pemberton Point, 2008

- Location of Pemberton Point within Massachusetts
- Coordinates: 42°18′17″N 70°55′10″W
- Country: United States
- State: Massachusetts
- County: Plymouth
- Town: Hull
- Time zone: UTC-5 (Eastern)
  - Summer (DST): UTC-4 (Eastern)
- ZIP code: 02045
- Area codes: 339 / 781

Pemberton Point (formerly known as Windmill Point) is a peninsula in Hull, Massachusetts. It is located at the tip of the Nantasket Peninsula, in Boston Harbor.

== History ==
Historic manuscripts have called the location "Windmill Point" since the 1820s. The windmills for which the point were named were used by two brothers to pump seawater into vats to be used for harvesting salt. The salt would then be used to pack fish.

On July 13, 1909, fourteen-year-old Rosie Pitenhof swam across the Hull Gut from Peddocks Island to Pemberton Point and back, believed to be the first to do so.

Hull High School, the town's public high school, opened on the point in 1957.

== Wind turbines ==
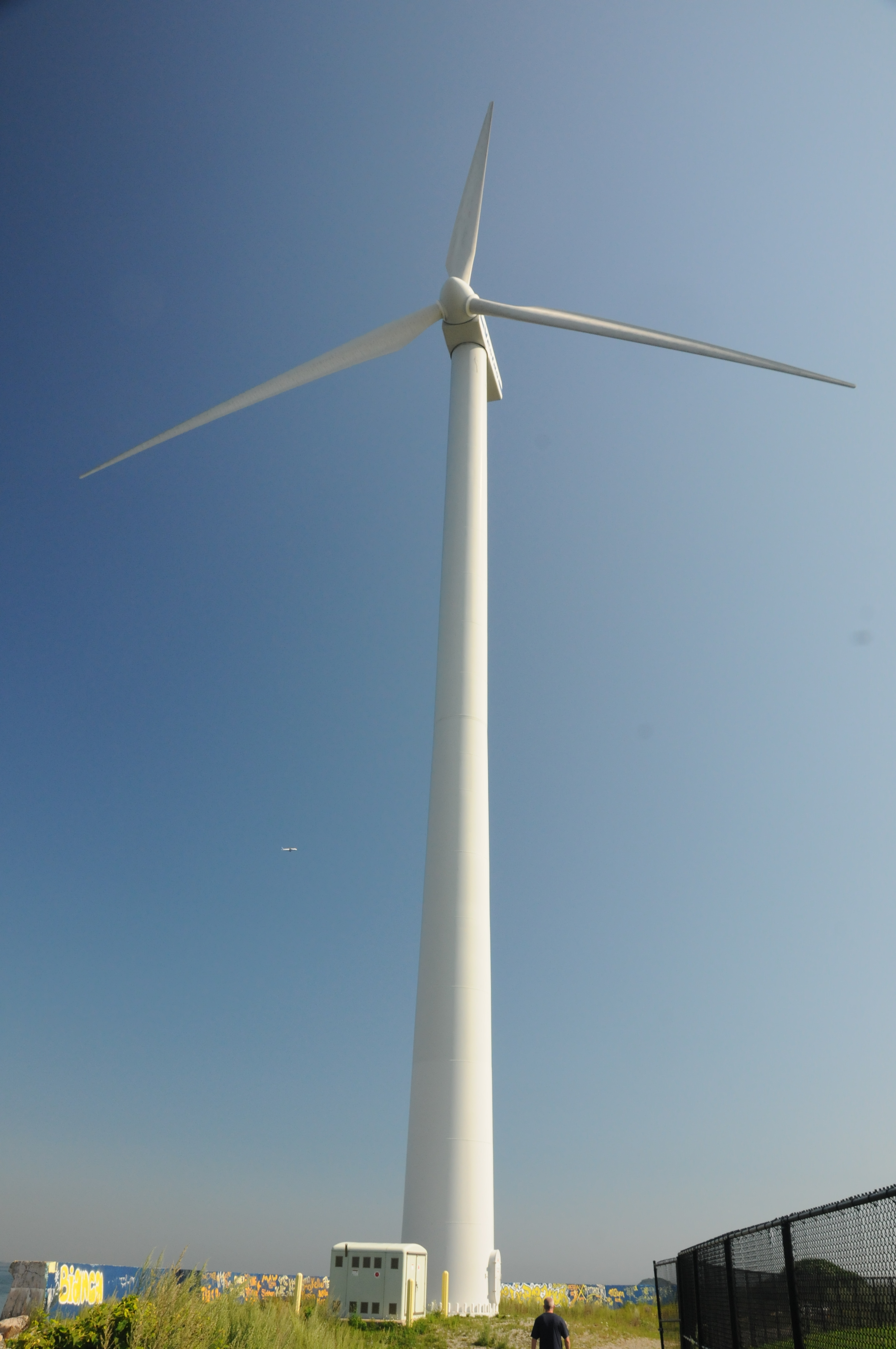
"Hull Wind 1"

An Enertech 40 kW wind turbine was installed on Pemberton Point and started energy production in March 1985. The turbine was funded by the Massachusetts Department of Energy Resources, and was sited adjacent to the high school. It was damaged beyond repair by a storm in March 1997, and was removed after a new wind turbine, nicknamed "Hull Wind 1", was installed nearby at the end of 2001.

=== Hull Wind 1 ===
Hull Wind 1, a new Vestas V47 turbine capable of producing 660 kW, began producing power on Pemberton Point in December 2001. It stood 150 feet (46 m) tall. It was the first commercial wind turbine on the East Coast of the United States and in the whole of New England. It was also the first commercial urban turbine in North America. During its first year of operation, it saved Hull over $100,000. In 2003, planning began for an additional wind turbine known as "Hull Wind 2". It was initially suggested that it be located near Hull Wind 1, but after concerns were expressed by nearby residents over having two in close proximity, the new Vestas V80 1.8 MW wind turbine was installed on a landfill to the east, away from Pemberton Point, and began operation in May 2006. Hull Wind 1 reached end of life in 2021 and was demolished in 2024 with no plans for a replacement. Hull Wind 2 was also demolished in 2024.

== Facilities ==
The United States Coast Guard Station Point Allerton was built in 1969 and is located near the point. It was commissioned on April 18, 1970. Point Allerton Lifesaving Station, which opened on October 15, 1889, used to hold the United States Coast Guard before the present station was built.

Pemberton Point is an intermediate stop on the MBTA ferry F2H route between Long Wharf in Boston and Hingham.

Pemberton Point Pier is a popular fishing location.

== See also ==
- Joshua James (lifesaver)
- Nantasket Beach
