= Fort Revere =

Fort in Massachusetts, United States

- Part of Harbor Defenses of Boston
- Allerton Point, Hull, Massachusetts
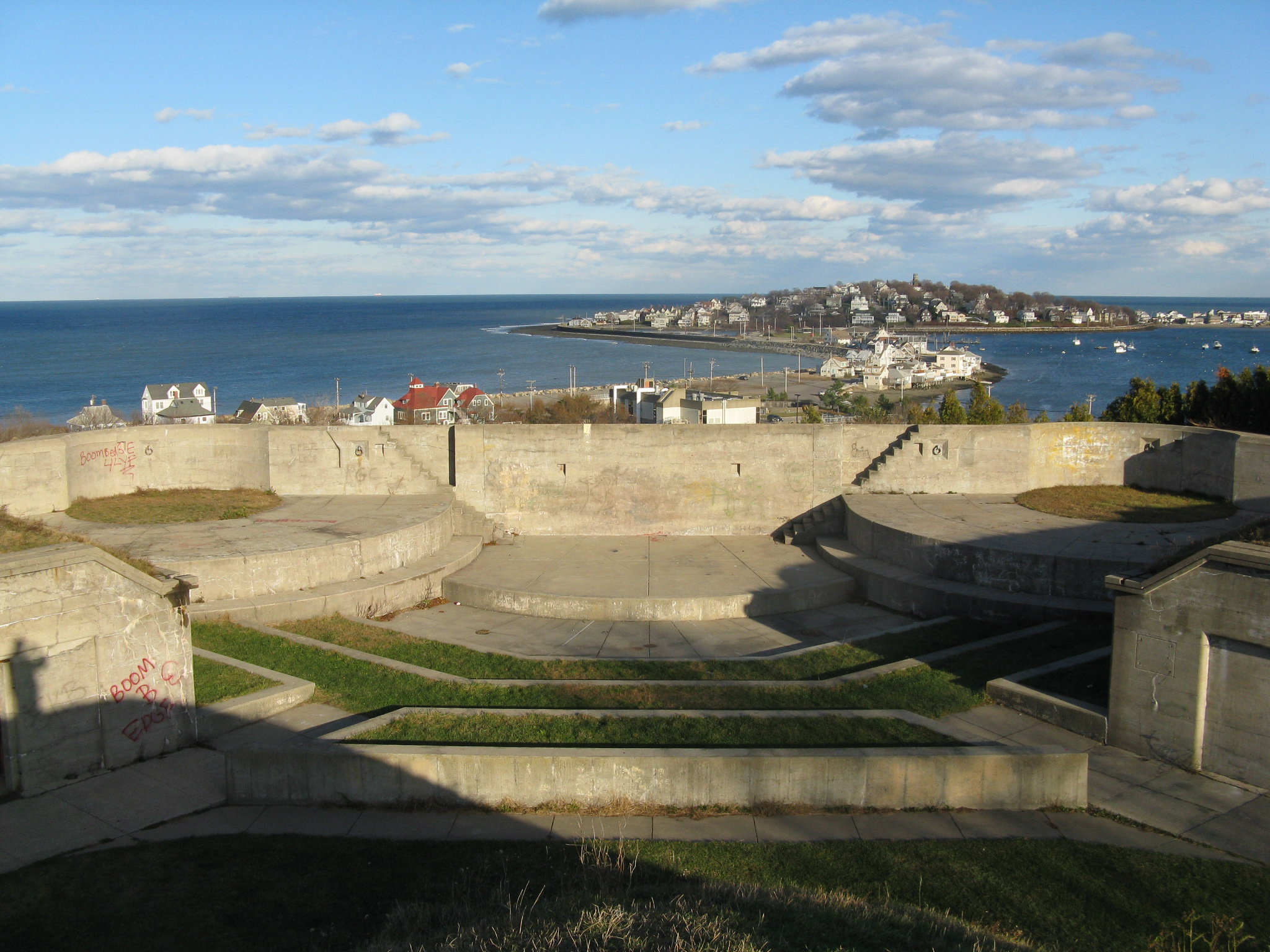
- Fort Revere Park overlooking Allerton and Hull.

Site information
- Type: Coastal Defense
- Owner: Massachusetts Department of Conservation and Recreation
- Open to the public: yes
- Condition: some batteries buried, remainder in good condition

Location
- Location in Massachusetts Fort Revere (the United States)
- Coordinates: 42°18′17″N 70°54′21″W

Site history
- Built: 1776, 1898–1906
- Built by: Patriot forces, French Marines, United States Army
- In use: 1776–1782, 1901–1947
- Battles/wars: World War I World War II

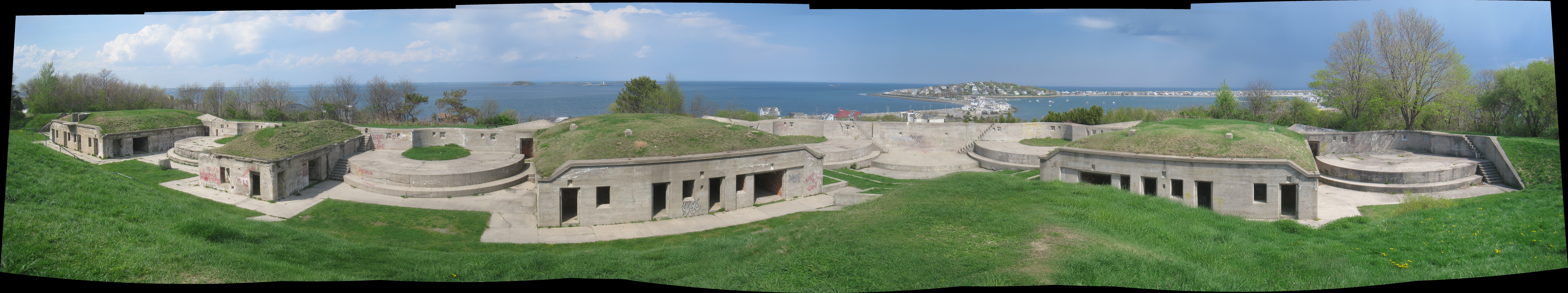
Panorama of Fort Revere's fortifications.

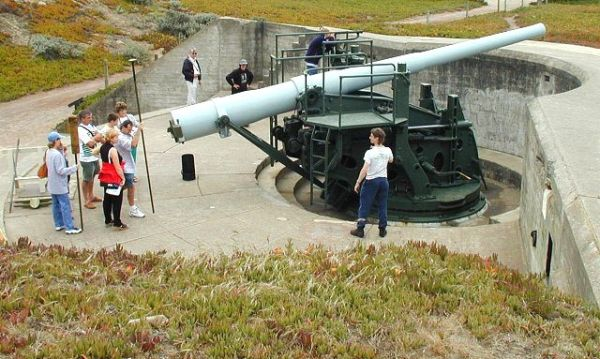
6-inch gun M1903 on disappearing carriage M1905 at Battery Chamberlin in San Francisco, similar to the 6-inch guns at Fort Revere.

Fort Revere is an 8-acre (3.2 ha) historic site situated on a small peninsula located in Hull, Massachusetts. It is situated on Telegraph Hill in Hull Village and contains the remains of two seacoast fortifications, one from the American Revolution and one that served 1898–1947. There are also a water tower with an observation deck, a military history museum and picnic facilities. It is operated as Fort Revere Park by the Metropolitan Park System of Greater Boston.

== History ==
=== American Revolution ===
Telegraph Hill, the site of Fort Revere, was first fortified by Patriot forces in 1776 during the American Revolution and called Fort Independence. In 1797 that name was transferred to the fort on Castle Island, which retains the name to this day. The fort on Telegraph Hill may have been called the Allerton Battery after 1797. It was used to protect Boston Harbor. By January 1777 the fort had embrasures for 15 guns, plus two detached batteries with an unknown number of guns and a military hospital nearby. By early 1778 the fort mounted 22 guns.

In August 1778 French Marines from D'Estaing's fleet were stationed at the fort, supervised by Chief Engineer du Portail (a French general assisting the Continental Army) at General Washington's direction. Through 1780 they greatly expanded the fort, probably with considerable help from Patriot forces. French activities presumably included the hilltop redoubt, detached batteries, a new 30-gun water battery, new barracks, hospital, and subsequent cemetery (still visible today).

=== 19th century ===
After the transfer of the fort's name in 1797 it was known locally as "the French fort". With no recorded activity in the War of 1812, the fort probably fell out of use after 1815. New fortifications were proposed for the Telegraph Hill area in the 1830s under the Third System of US fortifications, but none were built. The remains of the fort were demolished or covered over during Fort Revere's World War I-era buildup. Telegraph Hill became a semaphore station in the 1840s, later a telegraph station, and still later a radio station.

=== Endicott period ===
Fort Revere, named in honor of Paul Revere, was acquired as Nantasket Head Military Reservation in 1897 under the large-scale Endicott program, which initially included seven forts in the Coast (later Harbor) Defenses of Boston. The fort's batteries were built 1898–1906.

Fort Revere's batteries included:

Name	No. of guns	Gun type	Carriage type	Years active
Ripley	2	12-inch gun M1888	barbette M1892	1901–1943
Sanders	3	6-inch gun M1903	disappearing M1903	1903–1943
Pope	3	6-inch gun M1903	disappearing M1903	1903–1917
Field	2	5-inch gun M1897	balanced pillar M1896	1901–1917
Antiaircraft Battery 1	3	Unknown, possibly 3-inch gun M1917	Unknown, possibly AA pedestal	1936–1945
AMTB 941	4	90 mm gun	2 fixed M3, 2 towed	1943–1946

The fort's main armament was the two 12-inch guns of Battery Ripley, with a range of 18,400 yards (16,800 m). Battery Sanders was originally a six-gun battery, but two guns were administratively reassigned as Battery Pope in 1906, and in 1909 the guns were further reassigned with three guns in each battery. The two 5-inch guns of Battery Field were on "balanced pillar" carriages, a type of disappearing carriage that allowed the gun to be dropped down out of sight when not in use. The disappearing carriages of the 6-inch guns had to be lowered to reload the guns for each shot.

=== World War I through World War II ===
After the American entry into World War I in early 1917, the fort was expanded to include temporary structures such as quarters and additional storehouses. The three 6-inch guns of Battery Pope and the two 5-inch guns of Battery Field were earmarked for potential use on field carriages on the Western Front and were removed in late 1917. The 5-inch guns were apparently sent to France to arm the 69th Coast Artillery Regiment, but a source indicates that ammunition for these guns was never received. After the war all 5-inch guns were withdrawn from Coast Artillery service and apparently scrapped. The three 6-inch guns removed from Fort Revere were never returned to it; typically this type of weapon was stored after the war and re-used on new long-range mountings in World War II.

In 1927 the 12-inch guns at Fort Revere were rendered effectively obsolete by the two 16-inch guns of nearby Fort Duvall on Hog Island (now Spinnaker Island). A 3-gun antiaircraft battery was built in 1936.

With the outbreak of World War II in September 1939 Fort Revere was again built up with temporary structures to accommodate the 1940–1941 mobilization. With new defenses completed elsewhere in the Boston area, the fort's remaining original guns were scrapped in 1943. A battery of four 90 mm guns known as Anti-Motor Torpedo Boat Battery 941 (AMTB 941) was built in the area in 1943.

In 1947 Fort Revere was disarmed and turned over to the Commonwealth of Massachusetts.

=== Postwar to present ===
Following the decommissioning of the fort in 1947, efforts begun during the United States Bicentennial celebration in 1976 resulted in the fort's restoration and the installation of amphitheaters within the walls of the disused fortification. A small monument dedicated July 14, 1976 (Bastille Day) commemorates the French forces who served and died at the fort in the Revolution.

== Military chronology ==
1632 – The Hull peninsula, most likely at Telegraph Hill, was first considered by Governor Winthrop as an outer harbor defense for Boston. Deferred in favor of the 1634 works at Castle Island in South Boston.

1673 – An early warning beacon is established at Telegraph Hill to alert Boston of potential Dutch or French naval attacks.

1696 – Nantasket/Telegraph Hill beacon is erected during King William's War to forewarn against French revenge for the New England's raids into Canada.

1704 – Hull, and most notably Telegraph Hill, are used as a rendezvous camp for Church's northern expedition during Queen Anne's War.

1775 – National Register Nomination notes "Fort Independence was built on top of Telegraph Hill just prior to the Revolution." Citation is lacking, and documentation for pre-war construction by Crown, Province or rebels aside from the register is currently unavailable.

1776 – Telegraph Hill was probably first fortified by Patriot forces shortly after the conclusion of Washington's siege of Boston. Sources suggest that an earthwork battery fired on the blockading British fleet in June 1776. This work later saluted American Independence on 17 July 1776.

1777 – January of this year, Committee on Fortifications reports note that a ditched pentagonal fort with 15 embrasures stood at Hull. Supported by two detached water batteries, the fort still needed a glacis, powder magazine, guardhouse, and several barracks. A military hospital was located near the fort. In July, 575 troops and local militia were stationed at Hull's defenses.

1778 – The winter season brought reports from the Commander that the works mounted 22 pieces ranging from 42-pdr to 3-pdr guns. In August of that month, works at Telegraph Hill were upgraded by French Marines from D'Estaing's crippled fleet. French activities presumably included the hilltop redoubt, detached batteries, a new 30-gun water battery, new barracks, hospital, and subsequent cemetery (still visible today). A month later, in September, Washington assigned Chief Engineer du Portail to further strengthen the Hull defenses. The French arguably remained on the site in some shape or form through 1780. Smallpox caused the interment of over 200 released French prisoners of war and garrison members in the cantonment's cemetery. A notable survivor and commander at this site at this time was Louis Antoine de Bougainville, a contemporary of James Cook.

In 1782 the fortification was deactivated, and in 1783 the war was over.

1810s – It is speculated that the fortification was not fully reactivated during the War of 1812, however that it was a viable backup in case of emergency.

1813 – Telegraph Hill was used to observe the defeat of Lawrence's USS Chesapeake by HMS Shannon.

1830s – Proposals by the Corps of Engineers "Third System" of seacoast defense included outer harbor defenses at Telegraph Hill with a channel-side water battery secured by expanded fortifications atop the hill, which in turn were supported by additional works on Little Hog Island, and Point Allerton. These works were never built.

1840s – Telegraph Hill was extensively used as a semaphore/flag/electric telegraphy (and eventually radio) station to notify Boston of approaching merchant vessels. An observation tower was built within the old earthworks. (This is not the water tower seen today.)

1850s – Telegraph Hill saw little use during the Civil War other than its important and ongoing role as a surveillance and communications point.

1867 – The state militia sets up an encampment at Hull.

1885 – The Endicott Board of the War Department included the Telegraph Hill site in official plans for Boston Harbor's defense system.

1898 – The US Government purchased Fort Revere officially from the town, and the Massachusetts Militia were stationed there during the Spanish–American War.

Later this year construction began on the 77 acre Fort Revere Reservation as it is known today. The site included two 6-inch batteries atop Telegraph Hill, added after the 12- and 5-inch batteries near the shoreline. The detached military post included a variety of barracks, quarters, storehouses etc. Installation of artillery fire control facilities were extensive as they most likely included slighting the channel bearing flank of the Revolutionary War earthworks.

Fort Revere's batteries consisted of:

Battery	Memoriam	Weapons	Mounts	Built	Abandoned	Located
Sanders	Civil War	3×6″	Disappearing	1903–1906	1917/1943	Hillside
Pope	Civil War	3×6″	Disappearing	1903–1906	1917	Hillside
Ripley	War of 1812	2×12″	Barbette	1898–1899	1943	Shoreline
Field	Mexican–American War	2×5″	Pillar	1898–1899	1917	Shoreline

- Maximum effective range of cannon ca. 1775 = 1,500 yards
- Maximum effective range of 12-inch guns 18,400 yards

1903 – A water tower, with provisions for a military searchlight, was erected at Telegraph Hill within the old earthworks.

1917 – World War I finds Fort Revere an active Coast Artillery garrison, although the fort is stripped of its lighter weapons for potential field service in Europe.

1920s – Anti-aircraft emplacements are installed within the earthwork compound. Historic earthworks were leveled, and the area was eventually placed in caretaker status.

1940s – World War II established the 90mm AMTB Battery 941 at Fort Revere. Fort re-activated until end of war.

1950s – Fort Revere was evidently excluded from either the post-war anti-aircraft artillery or Nike missile defense systems of Boston. Municipal and private development commences at the site and several of the structures were recycled for private usage.

1970 – Two of the batteries were buried. (Ripley and Field)

1975 – Contract awarded to repair the water tower as part of a Bicentennial Celebration, plaque was placed in memory.

1976 – Town of Hull/Metropolitan District Commission (now the Department of Conservation and Recreation) dedicated Fort Independence/Fort Revere Park.

1990s – Massachusetts Historical Commission grants award to re-roof and keep the water tower open for supervised tours.

2000 – Debated over responsibility and ownership heat up between Town of Hull and Commonwealth of Massachusetts DCR. DCR maintains, and cleans graffiti from forts, mows lawns, and leads/supervises historic walking tours of the fort and its areas. DCR holds free movies during the summer on the parade ground and concerts in the batteries.

2010 – Town of Hull orders no more tours for summer in the tower. Park is still a viable recreational space for tourists and towns people alike. The officer's quarters still stands in the back and is a museum, with artillery outside, and interactive exhibits inside, open when staffing is possible. Many of the residents of the park, live in former military housing, and frequent the common space during the seasons with dogs, children and other recreational activities.

== See also ==
- 9th Coast Artillery (United States)
- 241st Coast Artillery (United States)
- Seacoast defense in the United States
- United States Army Coast Artillery Corps
- List of military installations in Massachusetts
