= Hull High School =

Location
- 180 Main St., Hull, MA 02045; United States; 42°18′15.35″N 70°55′13.17″W

Information
- Type: Public
- Established: 1957; 69 years ago
- School district: Hull Public Schools
- Principal: Robert Shaw, Ph.D.
- Staff: 24.00 (FTE)
- Grades: 8–12
- Enrollment: 233 (2023–2024)
- Student to teacher ratio: 9.71
- Campus: Suburban
- Colors: Blue & Gold
- Mascot: Pirate
- Rivals: Cohasset, South Shore Voc-Tech, Norwell
- Newspaper: "The Pirate Times"
- Yearbook: "The Privateer"
- Website: hs.hullpublicschools.org

Hull High School is a public high school located in Hull, Massachusetts, United States. It is located at 180 Main Street adjacent to the Hull Gut, overlooking Boston Harbor and the Boston skyline. Hull has an approximate enrollment of 380 students in grades 8–12. The school's mascot is the Pirates and the school colors are Royal Blue and Gold. Grade 8 relocated to Hull High School in 2024 after the Memorial Middle School closed due to decreased enrollment.

== Curriculum ==
As of 2015, Spanish was the sole foreign language offered at the school.

== Athletics ==
Hull's football field is located at the very tip of the town and is surrounded by water on three sides. From the football field the Boston skyline is visible at the north of the field about five miles across Boston Harbor. Hull is also known for having a 210-foot high wind turbine located about 30 feet behind the north end zone.

- Football State Champions – 1977, 1996, 2022
- Football State Finalists – 1992, 2021
- Baseball State Finalists – 2004

== Notable alumni ==
- Kenny Greer, MLB pitcher
- Dean Tong, author
