= Dean Tong =

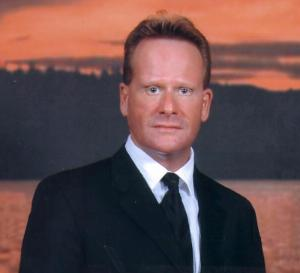
- Tong in 2013
- Education: Bachelor of Science in Biology and Pre-Medicine from Northeastern University; Master of Science in Psychology and the Law in Child Forensic Studies from the University of Portsmouth
- Occupations: author, public speaker, consultant, trial expert
- Website: https://abuse-excuse.com/

Dean Tong is an American author, public speaker, consultant, and trial expert in the field of false child abuse allegations. He has consulted for the media on cases such as that of Elian Gonzalez. He is the author of three books inspired by his personal experience with being accused of child abuse in 1985. In addition to testifying as an expert witness, he has appeared on radio talk shows and television speaking on the topic of false abuse accusations. He has also been quoted by publications on the topic including by the Chicago Defender, The Virginian-Pilot, The Boston Globe, and The Denver Post.

== Early life and education ==
Tong graduated from Hull High School. He obtained a Bachelor of Science degree in Biology and Pre-Medicine from Northeastern University in 1979.

He went on to study at the University of Portsmouth and Leeds in the United Kingdom where he obtained a master's degree in Psychology and the Law in Child Forensic Studies in 2006. His master thesis at the University of Portsmouth entitled "Penile Plethysmograph, Abel Assessment for Sexual Interest, and MSI-II: Are They Speaking the Same Language" was published in the May/June 2007 issue of the American Journal of Family Therapy.

He originally worked as a laboratory medical technologist.

== Criminal sexual abuse allegations; dropped for lack of evidence ==
In 1985, Tong was accused by his then-wife of sexually abusing his 3-year-old daughter. His daughter herself accused him of sexually abusing her. He was in a custody battle with his estranged wife at the time. He was subsequently arrested, charged with capital sexual battery, and placed under court order not to see his children. Tong spent two weeks in jail. The criminal charges were dropped against him 14 months later for lack of evidence. Tong then faced ten years of legal battles including two lawsuits and spent $120,000 on eight lawyers and seven psychiatrists to clear his name, while his children live with their mother.

== Domestic violence and witness tampering charges ==
In January 2008, Tong was arrested and charged with domestic violence and tampering with a witness to avoid prosecution. The sheriffs deputies' arrest affidavit stated that Tong had grabbed his then-wife's arm, and slammed her foot in a bedroom door during an argument, leading to her suffering bruises on her arm and leg. It was alleged that when she then tried to call 911, he took her phone from her and told her he would "ruin her" if she called police. He was released from the Hillsborough County Jail on $1,000 bail.

== Career ==
Tong runs a consultancy in Florida by the name of Abuse Excuse. His consultancy is in the fields of divorce, child custody, abuse accusations, sexual or physical child abuse, domestic violence, parental alienation, and sexual allegations in divorce. He has given expert testimony in 10 states in cognitive child development psychology and is contracted to perform critique of investigations conducted by Child Protective Services and law enforcement agencies related to accusations of abuse as well as forensic interviews of children allegedly abused. He has also been appointed by courts as an expert witness for criminal indigent defendants. Tong has also been hired by protective mothers who lose child custody because they are perceived to be coaching their children to make false abuse allegations against fathers.

Tong was part of the legal team for Darren Mack during his divorce. Mack was later charged with the murder of his estranged wife as well as the sniper shooting of the judge who handled the divorce proceedings. After the shooting, he spoke with Mack by telephone and informed him to turn himself into authorities. He also authored an op-ed piece in the Las Vegas Review Journal condemning Mack's actions. Tong appeared in the 2007 CBS 48 Hours Mystery Special documenting the events surrounding Mack and the murder of his wife as well as commentary about the case on Rita Cosby: Live & Direct Tong has made other appearances on national television talk shows, including on Dr. Phil, CNN's Nancy Grace, and The Montel Williams Show.

Tong was a media consultant to WFTV Channel 9 during the trial of Casey Anthony and a media consultant for cases such as the Elián González affair, Murder of JonBenét Ramsey, and the sexual abuse allegations against Michael Jackson from 2003 to 2005. He was also a media consultant to ABC News during the Kobe Bryant sexual assault case in 2003.

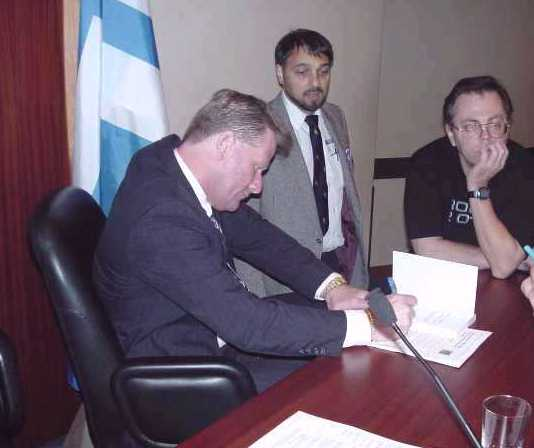
Tong signing autographs at the 2000 F.A.C.T. – Parenting Conference.

Tong is a public speaker and has performed engagements including keynote speaker at FathersDay2000, a rally held in Washington DC to spread awareness of fathers who are not allowed to participate in raising their children. He has also spoke as part of the Children's Rights Council national conference.

Tong is the author of three books and publications on the topic of false abuse allegations. In 1992, Tong published Don't Blame ME, Daddy: False Accusations of Child Sexual Abuse. It was written after his legal battles to prove his innocence of accusations against him. The book detailed the increase of false accusations of child sexual abuse in relation to divorce and child custody cases. He followed up with the book Ashes to Ashes, Families to Dust in 1996. The book provided information for those falsely accused of abuse. In 2002, Tong published his third book, Elusive Innocence: Survival Guide for the Falsely Accused. The book, which targeted attorneys, detailed the difference between actual abuse and false accusations of abuse as well as domestic violence allegations. It included chapters on fighting false accusations and a summary of case studies involving false accusations. Tong also penned the foreword to the 2009 book I'm Going to be a Dad, Now What? written by Craig Baird.

=== Bibliography ===
- 2002, Elusive Innocence: Survival Guide for the Falsely Accused
- 1996, Ashes to Ashes, Families to Dust: False Accusations of Child Abuse: A Roadmap for Survivors
- 1992, Don't Blame ME, Daddy: False Accusations of Child Sexual Abuse

=== Select publications ===
- 2012, Sesame Street and Sex Abuse Clash, Ground Report
- 2007, The Penile Plethysmograph, Abel Assessment for Sexual Interest and MSI-II: Are They Speaking the Same Language?, The American Journal of Family Therapy
- 2003, Will Bryant's fame cost his chance for fair trial?, Post-Tribune
- To Err Is Human, Especially in Child Abuse Cases, About.com

== Personal ==
Tong has served as the president of VOCAL (Victims of Child Abuse Laws) in the Tampa Bay area.
