= Hull Yacht Club =

Yacht club in Massachusetts

Coordinates: 42°18′23.6″N 70°53′32.9″W

- Burgee
- Short name: HYC
- Founded: 1880, 1932
- Location: 5 Fitzpatrick Way, Hull, Massachusetts 02045 United States
- Website: http://www.hullyc.org/History.aspx

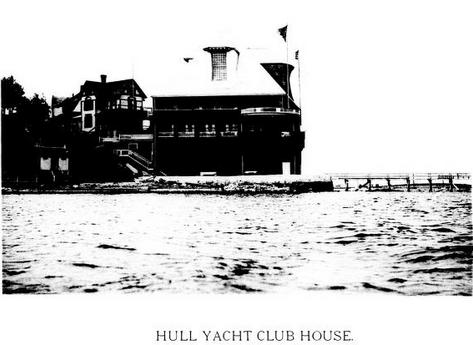
The clubhouse around 1894

The Hull Yacht Club was founded in Hull, Massachusetts in 1880. It merged with the Massachusetts Yacht Club in 1899, and with the Boston Yacht Club in 1903. Their large clubhouse, which had been opened in 1891, was demolished in the 1930s. A new club was formed in 1932, using the former clubhouse of the Old Beacon Club on Allerton Hill. This was relocated to Fitzpatrick Way in 1939. The Yacht Club continues to host the Scorpion bowl regatta.
