= Hull Public Schools =

School district in Massachusetts

Location
- Hull, Massachusetts USA

District information
- Type: Public
- Grades: K-12
- Superintendent: Judith Kuehn
- Budget: $15,190,677

Students and staff
- Students: 839

Other information
- Website: www.hullpublicschools.org

Hull Public Schools is a school district in Hull, Massachusetts. It has two schools: Jacobs Elementary School and Hull High School. Hull Public schools closed the Memorial Middle School in 2024 and relocated grades 6 and 7 to the Elementary school and grade 8 to the High School. The building formerly known as the Memorial Middle School is going to be retrofitted to hold the Town of Hull Public Offices with a date TBD.

In 2009, the district was experiencing a budget shortfall due to difficulties in the economy. That year the district ended middle school Spanish, but the district added back Spanish instruction the following year. As of 2015 Spanish remains the sole foreign language offered by the district. That year Kathleen Tyrell, the superintendent, stated that the district does not have enough financial power to offer any foreign languages other than Spanish.
