= It's All a Long Goodbye =

Studio album by On Broken Wings
- Released: 2005
- Genre: Metalcore
- Length: 32:32
- Label: Eulogy Recordings

On Broken Wings chronology
Some of Us May Never See the World (2003)	It's All a Long Goodbye (2005)	Going Down (2007)

Professional ratings
Review scores
Source	Rating
AllMusic	3/5 stars

It's All a Long Goodbye is On Broken Wings' second release on Eulogy Recordings. There was a video shot for "Frozen Over". The album features many tracks that are re-recorded versions of songs from Some of Us May Never See the World.

== Track listing ==
1. "Suffer" - 1:48
2. "Pushing Up Daisies" - 3:00
3. "More Than Life" - 2:58
4. "I Do My Crosswords in Pen" - 3:36
5. "Frozen Over" - 2:31
6. "Listless" - 3:18
7. "Tongue in Teeth" - 3:06
8. "Nothing New" - 2:23
9. "Hell or High Water" - 2:56
10. "Deadpool" - 2:40
11. "Ashes and Snow" - 4:09

== Personnel ==
- Jonathan Blake – vocals
- Mike McMillen – guitar
- Burke Medeiros – guitar
- Jerome McBride – bass
- Kevin Garvin – drums

=== Production and design ===
- Layout and design – Ian Rowan and Pete Salpeas
- Layout and design concept – Jonathan Blake
- Recorded and mixed – Tim Gilles, Chris, Erin Farley and Arun Venkatesh at Big Blue Meenie Recording Studio
- Mastering – Allan Duches at West West Side
