= Newbury Comics =

Comic book and music retail chain in New England, United States

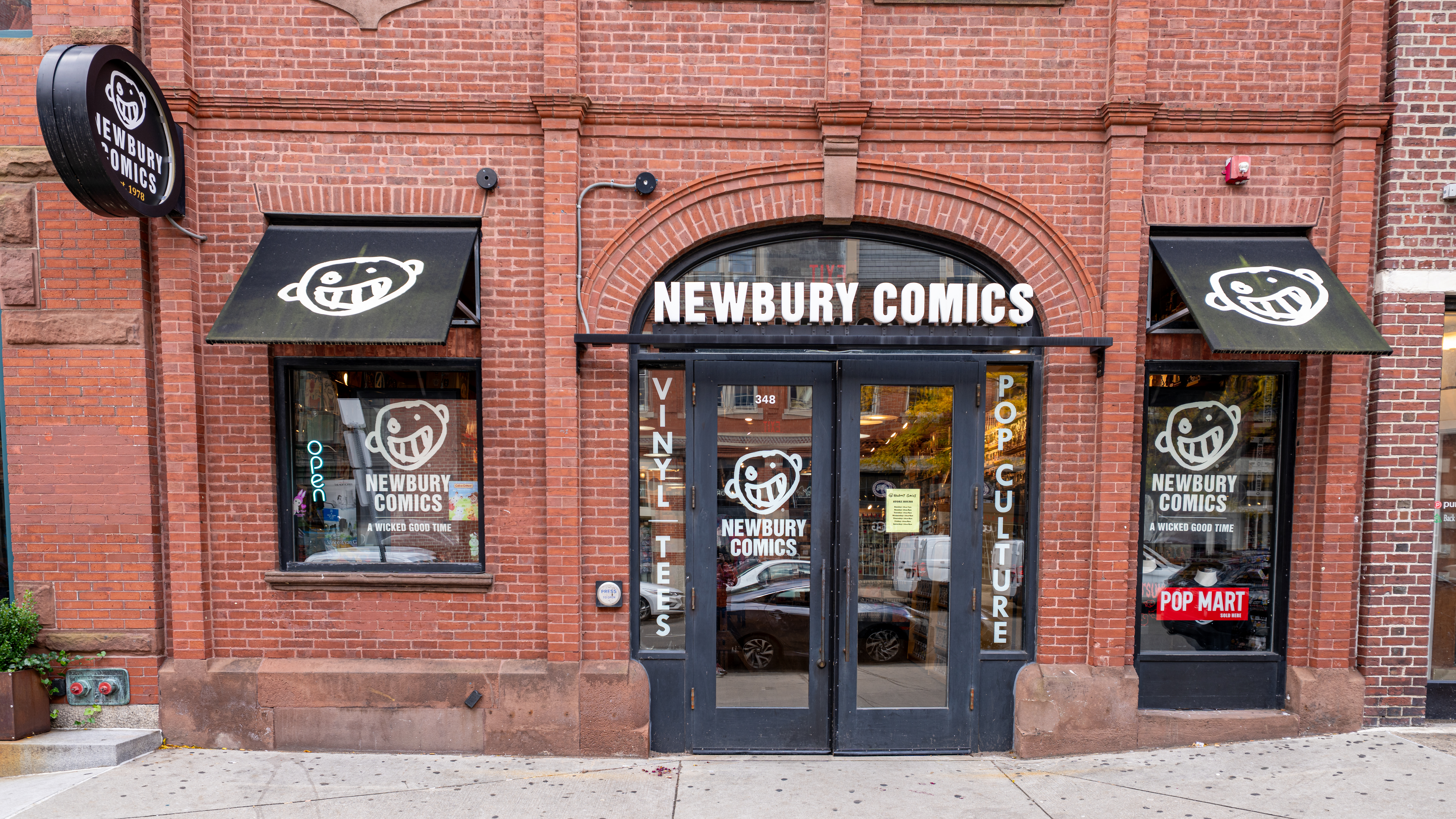
- Newbury Comics Flagship on Newbury Street
- Type: Private
- Industry: Entertainment retail
- Founded: Boston, Massachusetts, U.S., 1978
- Founder: John Brusger; Mike Dreese
- Headquarters: Boston, Massachusetts, U.S.
- Number of locations: 30
- Area served: Northeastern United States
- Website: www.newburycomics.com

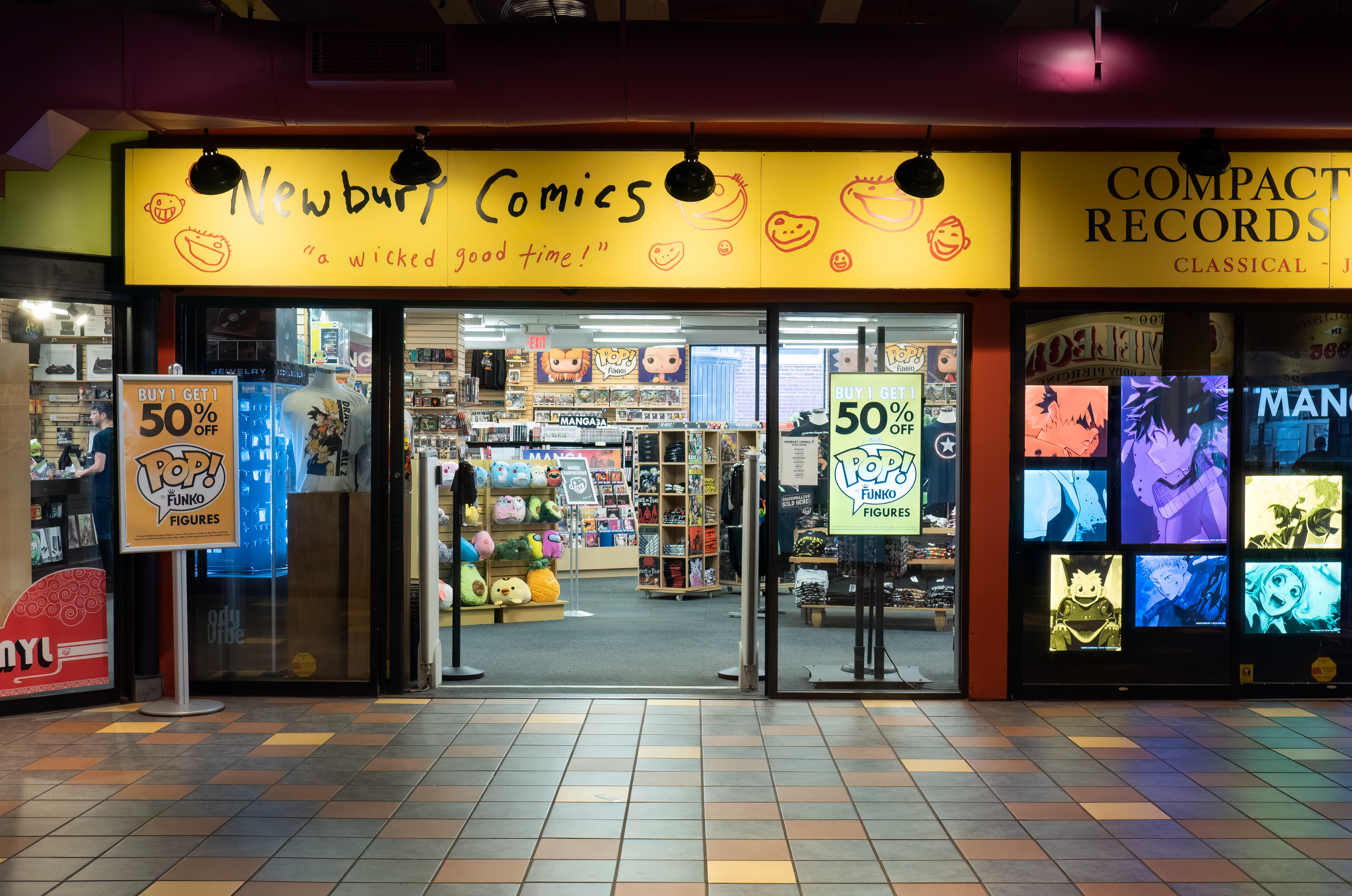
Newbury Comics inside the Garage mall in Harvard Square

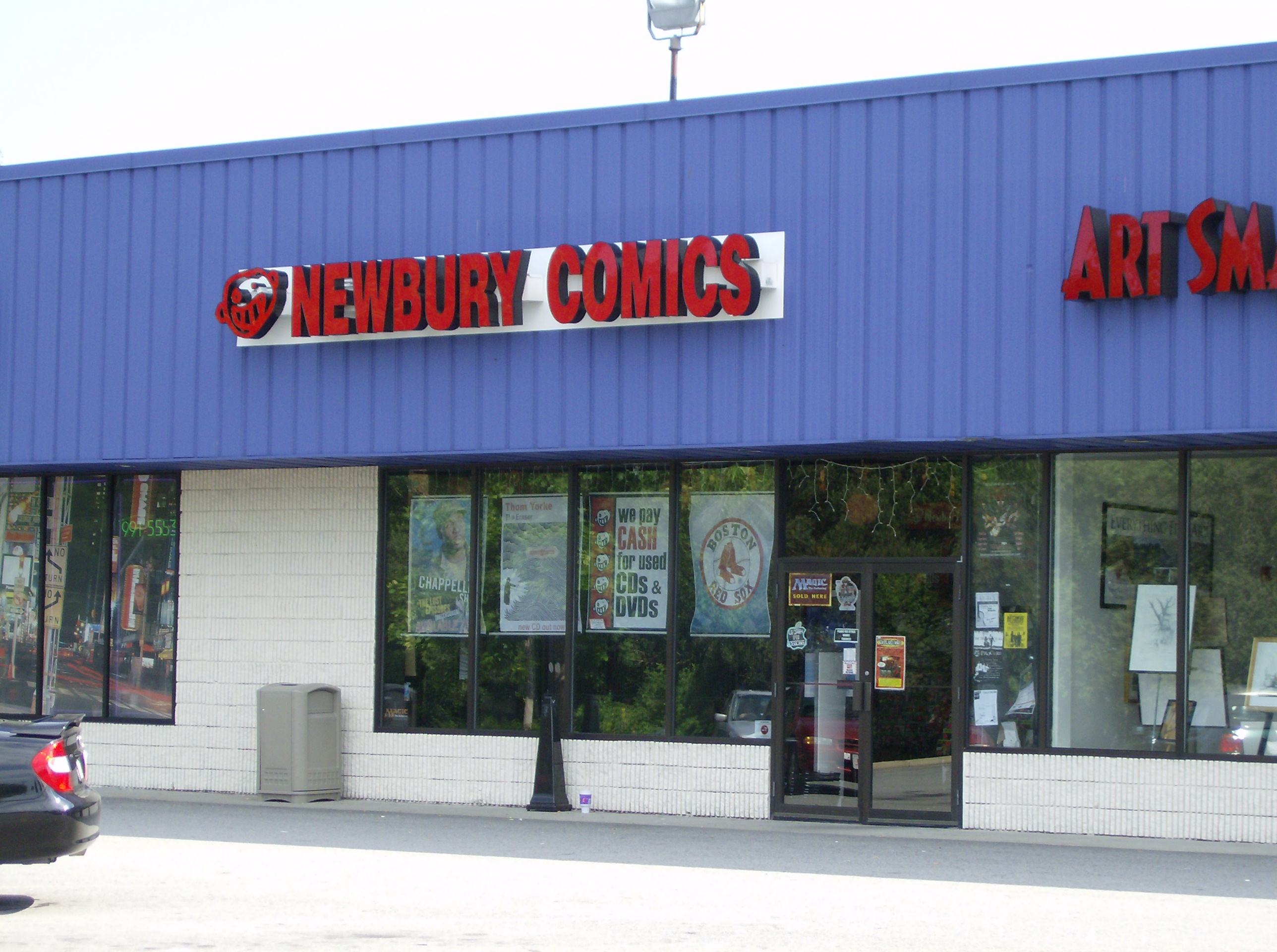
Newbury Comics in North Dartmouth, now moved into the Dartmouth Mall

Newbury Comics is an American entertainment retailer based in the northeastern United States. It began as a comic book vendor on Newbury Street in Boston, but later expanded to include music, movies, fashion, and other pop culture items. The company was founded in 1978 by Massachusetts Institute of Technology students John Brusger and Mike Dreese. Dreese also published Boston Rock, a music tabloid which was active from 1980 to 1987 that focused on punk, new wave and indie bands.

The company currently has 30 stores open across six states: 12 in Massachusetts, 9 in New York, 4 in New Hampshire, 2 in Connecticut, 2 in Rhode Island, and 1 in Maine. Newbury Comics' first location to be opened outside of New England was at the Roosevelt Field Mall in Garden City, New York, in 2016. The chain also had a sister store called Hootenanny which mostly sold punk-style clothing, located one floor below the Newbury Comics in Harvard Square. Hootenanny closed in May 2012, while the flagship Newbury Comics banner was altering its product mix to include more fashion. Newbury Comics stores are gradually shifting from strip centers to mall locations.

== Notable employees ==
Former logo; still in use at some locations

- Andy Bonner of the Boston band Piebald worked for years at both the Harvard Square and Alewife locations. The band's "King of the Road" includes the lyrics "Andy went back to school. He got sick of Newbury Comics."
- Valerie Forgione of Mistle Thrush is the company's Executive Vice President
- Joe Guese, guitarist of The Click Five, worked at the flagship Newbury Comics briefly before joining the band.
- Rob Hamilton and Chris Pearson of Green Magnet School worked at the Framingham store and the warehouse, respectively, when the band was signed to Sub Pop records.
- The songwriter Aimee Mann worked at the Newbury Street store in the early 1980s.
- David Shibler worked at the original Newbury Street location while becoming the bass player in the local band the Turbines.
- Jon Syverson, Alexis S.F. Marshall, and Samuel Moorehouse Walker of Daughters have worked at the Providence and North Attleboro locations.
- Chris Pupecki (Doomriders, Black Tail & ex–Cast Iron Hike) worked at the Natick store.
- Johnny Earle, founder of clothing line Johnny Cupcakes, worked at Newbury Comics, where he would secretly sell shirts out of his car on bathroom breaks.
- Jon Strader, guitarist of the band No Trigger, worked at the Shrewsbury location.
- Paul DeGeorge, of Harry and the Potters, worked at various stores, including both Cambridge locations.
- Ian St. Germain, bass player and drummer of Burnt Fur and Tracy Husky, worked at the Harvard Square location.
- Mark McKay, drummer of hardcore punk band Slapshot was a manager of several Newbury Comics stores and worked in the IT department as well as working for Interscope Records.
- Ryan McKenney and Brian Izzi of the band Trap Them, worked at the Salem, NH store.
- Aaron Dalbec of Bane, Only Crime and ex-Converge worked at the Shrewsbury store during the mid-to-late 90s.
- Tanya Donelly of the Throwing Muses, The Breeders and Belly.

== Company logo in popular culture ==
In the movie Hatchet (2006), star Joel Moore spends much of the film in a blood-spattered Newbury Comics T-shirt. This was due to the fact, that writer/director, Adam Green, is from Mass, and loved the store. In reaction to this Newbury Comics started selling special Hatchet T-shirts like the one in the movie. The "Tooth Face" Logo T-shirt is featured in the second issue of The Bulletproof Coffin comics from Image Comics.

In the fifth and sixth season opening credits for Sabrina, the Teenage Witch, Sabrina, portrayed by Melissa Joan Hart, is seen walking out of the store on Newbury Street.

The song "Newbury Comics" by John Lipari was released on March 15, 2024 from his third studio album The Singer of Staten Island.

The song "Newbury Comics (Another Stupid Love Song)" by Massachusetts-based band Pilgrimage was released on June 2, 2025 off their debut EP Happy Valley.

== Store locations ==
Connecticut:

- Danbury - Danbury Fair
- Manchester - The Shoppes at Buckland Hills

Maine:

- South Portland - The Maine Mall

Massachusetts:

- Boston - Faneuil Hall Marketplace
- Boston - Newbury Street
- Braintree - South Shore Plaza
- Burlington - Burlington Mall
- Cambridge - Harvard Square
- Hyannis - Cape Cod Mall
- Kingston - Kingston Collection
- Natick - Natick Mall
- North Dartmouth - Dartmouth Mall
- Northampton
- Norwood
- Peabody - Northshore Mall

New Hampshire:

- Manchester
- Nashua - Pheasant Lane Mall
- Salem - The Mall at Rockingham Park
- West Lebanon

New York:

- Albany - Crossgates Mall
- Buffalo - Walden Galleria
- Garden City - Roosevelt Field Mall
- Lake Grove - Smith Haven Mall
- Staten Island, New York City - Staten Island Mall
- Syracuse - Destiny USA
- Victor (Rochester) - Eastview Mall
- West Nyack - Palisades Center
- White Plains - The Westchester Mall

Rhode Island:

- Providence - Providence Place Mall
- Warwick
