= Fort Revere Park =

State park in Massachusetts

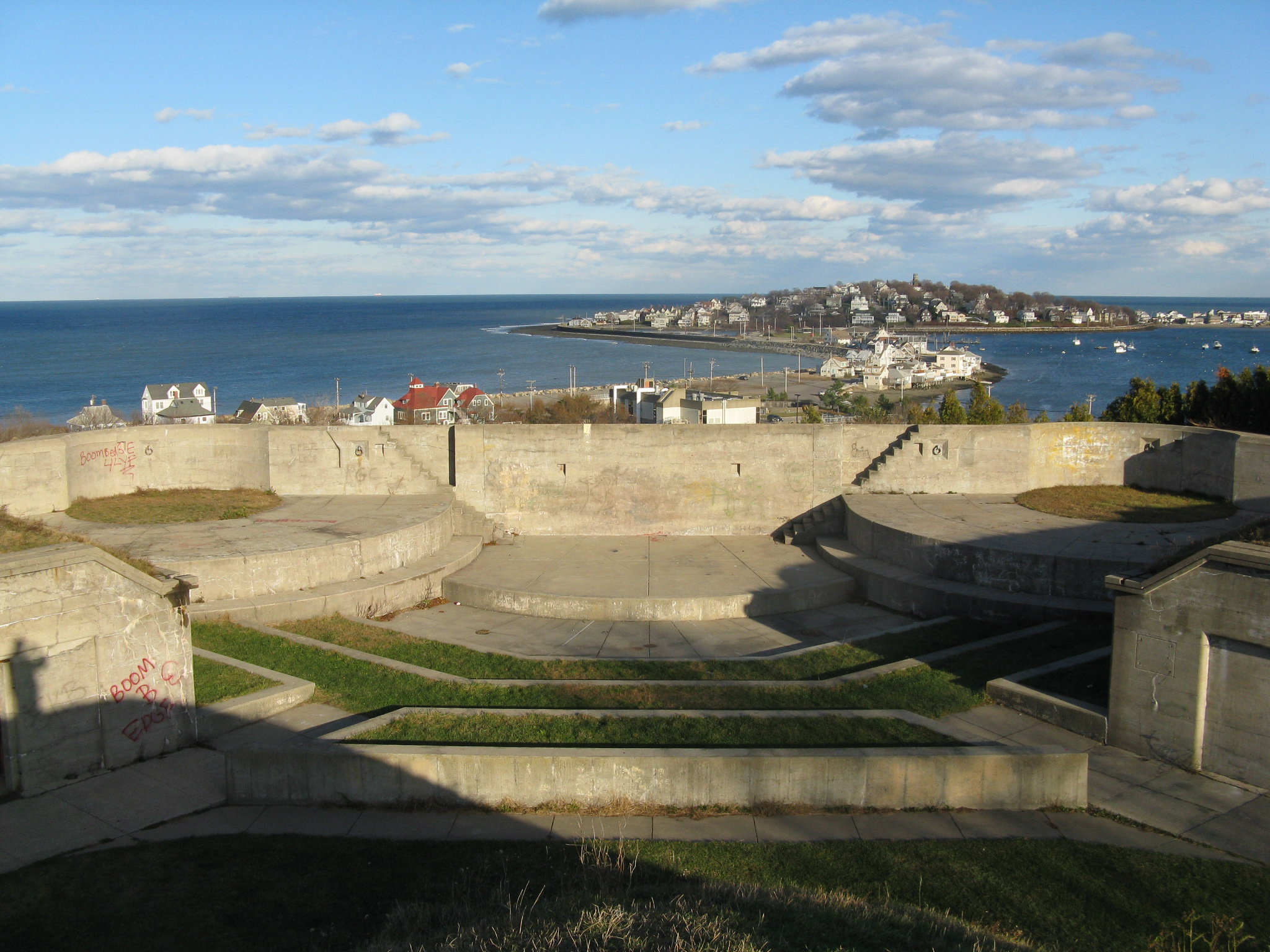
- Fort Revere Park overlooking Allerton

- Location within Massachusetts Location within the United States
- Location: Hull, Massachusetts, United States
- Coordinates: 42°18′22″N 70°54′28″W
- Area: 6 acres (2.4 ha)
- Elevation: 62 ft (19 m)
- Established: 1976
- Administrator: Massachusetts Department of Conservation and Recreation
- Website: Official website

Fort Revere Park is a state-owned historic site and public recreation area situated on a small peninsula in the town of Hull, Massachusetts. The park occupies 6 acres (2.4 ha) on Telegraph Hill in Hull Village and houses the remains of two seacoast fortifications, including former Fort Revere.

== Activities and amenities ==
The park includes a water tower with observation deck, a military history museum, and picnicking facilities and is open from sunrise until sunset. The tower which was closed in 2012 due to structural issues may be reopened following the provision a 2.2 million dollar fund during a town meeting in 2022.

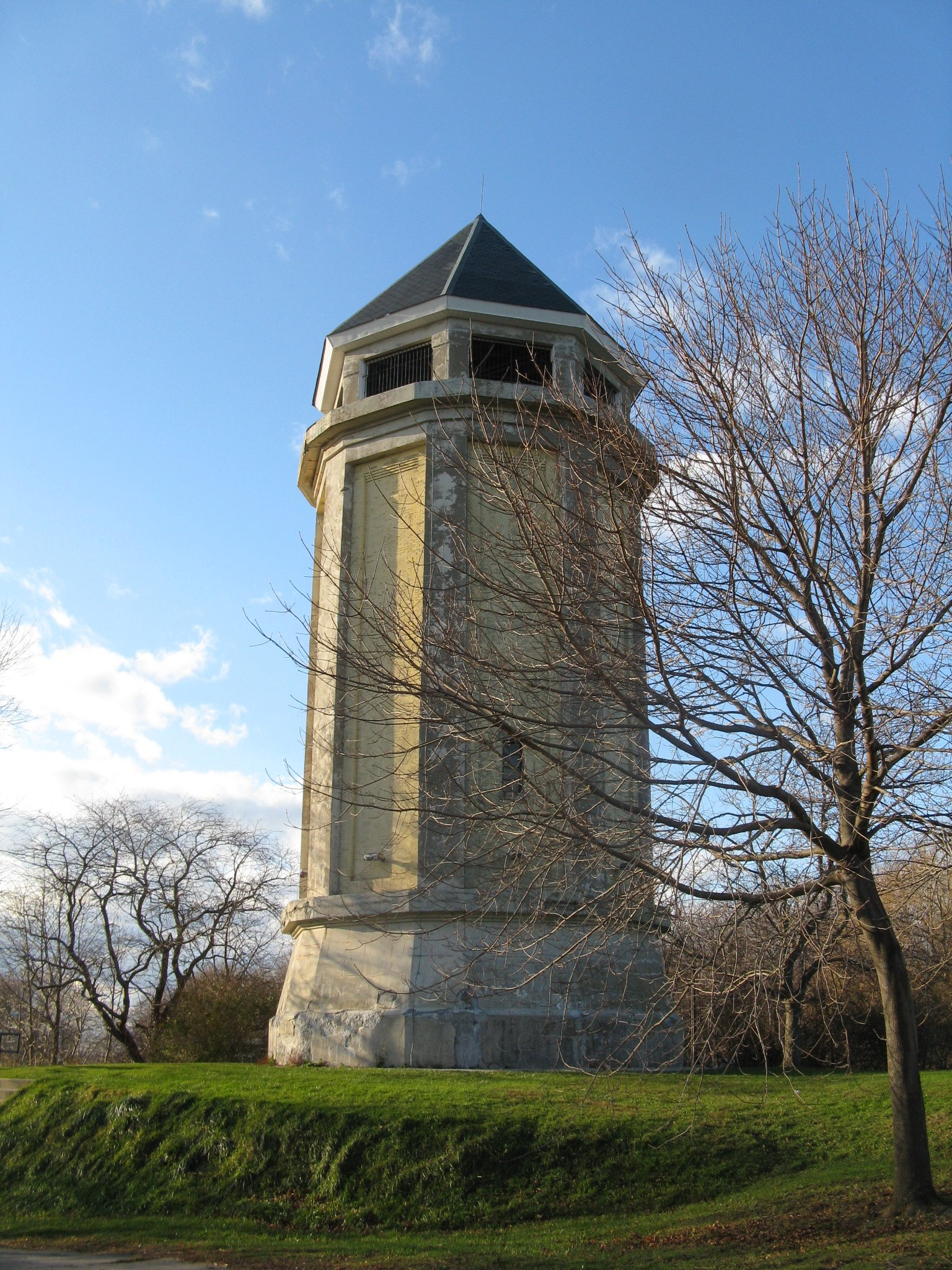
The watertower on Telegraph Hill

An additional $150,000 for the project was sought from the Hull Redevelopment Authority in 2024.

== Graffiti ==
The park has been the site of much graffiti. Tagging peaked in 2016 and 2017, and has decreased since then. In 2016, many local volunteers in Hull associated with the Fort Revere Park and Preservation Society and other Hull residents painted over much of the vandalism with white, spray-resistant paint.
