= Hull Gut =

Coordinates: 42.3025°N 70.9246°W

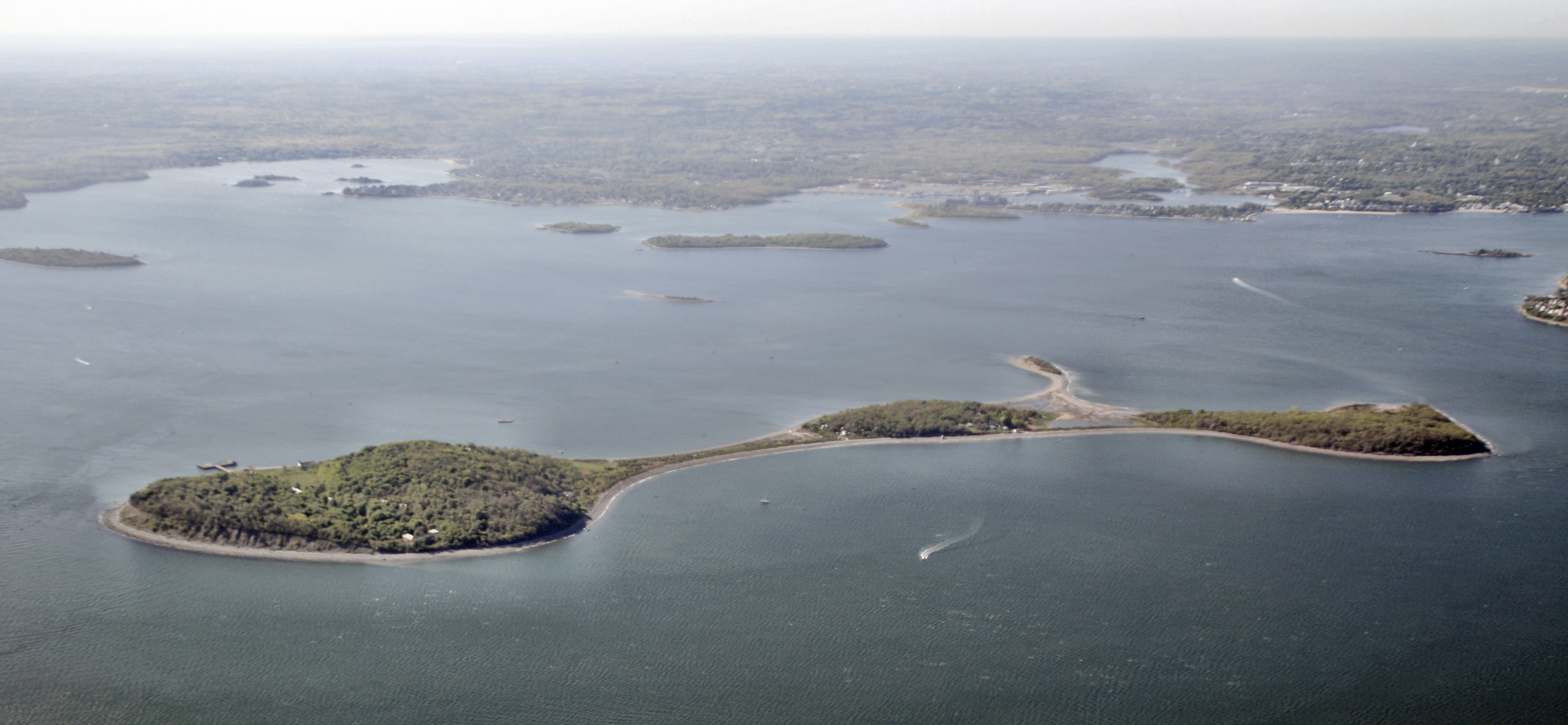
Peddocks Island, with Hull Gut to the left, off the East Head.

Hull Gut is a gut (a narrow, naturally dredged deep-water channel) about half a mile wide and thirty-five feet deep, in Boston Harbor running between Pemberton Point in Hull and the East Head of Peddocks Island. Along with its sister channel, West Gut, which runs between the West Head of Peddocks Island and Hough's Neck in Quincy, Hull Gut forms the southern entrance to the Inner Harbor connecting it to Hingham Bay. To the north the gut intersects with the deep-water shipping lane Nantasket Roads. Strong cross-currents and often heavy traffic make the gut a dangerous waterway. The channel is used by oil tankers and other freighters bound for industries around the Weymouth Fore River in Braintree, Weymouth, and Quincy and, historically, was used by the shipbuilding industry.

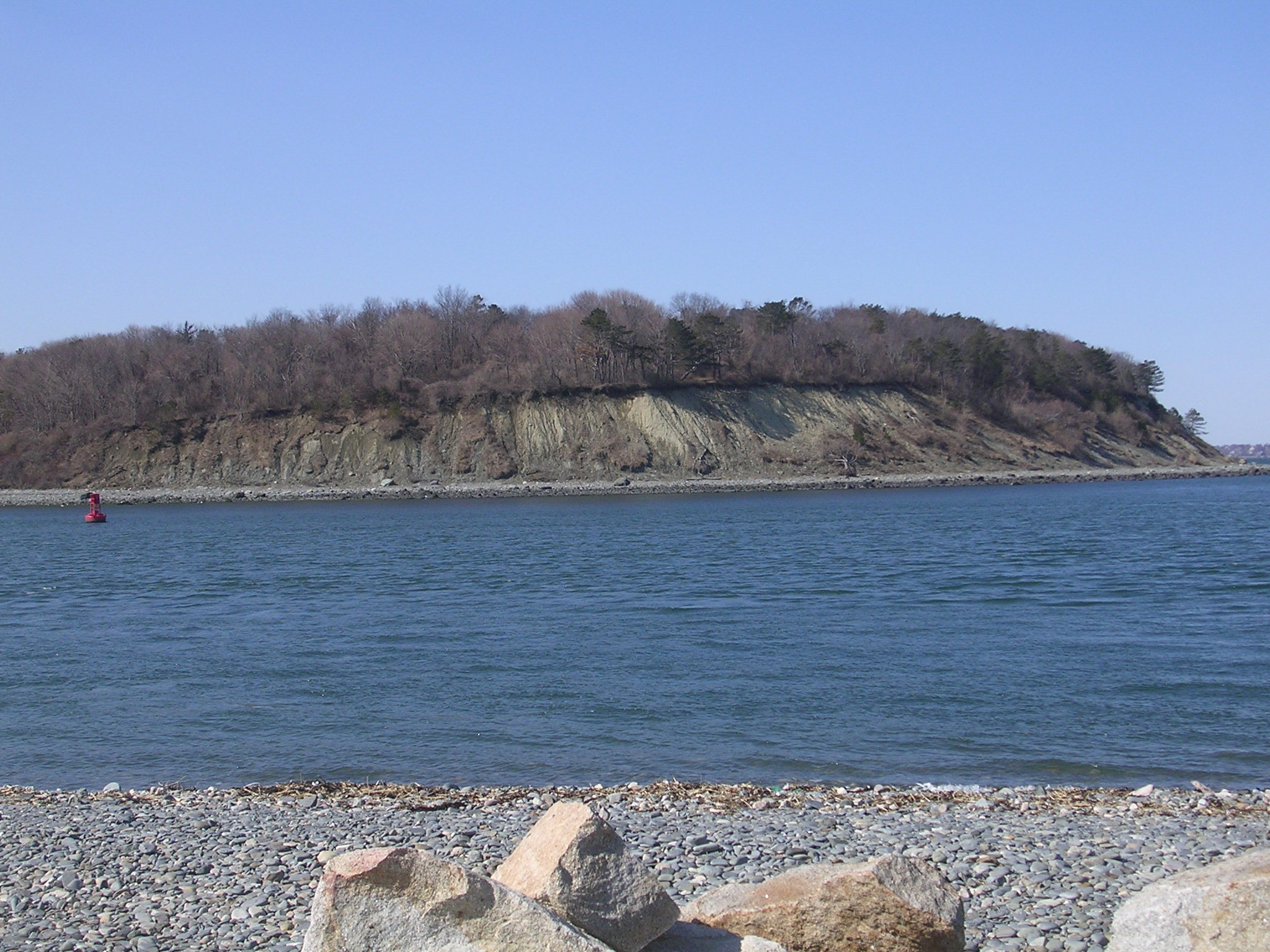
View across Hull Gut

In 1909 Rosie Pitenhof, a fourteen-year-old girl from Dorchester, was the first known person to successfully swim across the gut, from Peddocks Island to the shore at Pemberton in Hull, and back again at flood tide. Miss Pitenhof was in the water twenty-two minutes; nine minutes crossing and thirteen minutes returning.

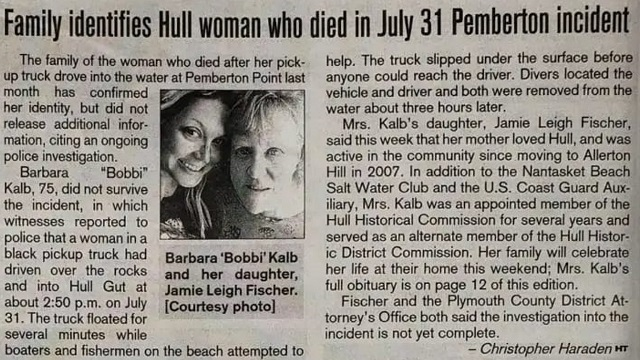

On July 31, 2022 Hull resident Barbara Lynn Kalb drove her brown pickup truck into the Gut and died several hours later after a dive team performed a large search and rescue effort. The event was widely covered by local news media and press with the investigation determining the death was accidental and there was no foul play.
