= Webb Memorial State Park =

State park in Massachusetts, United States

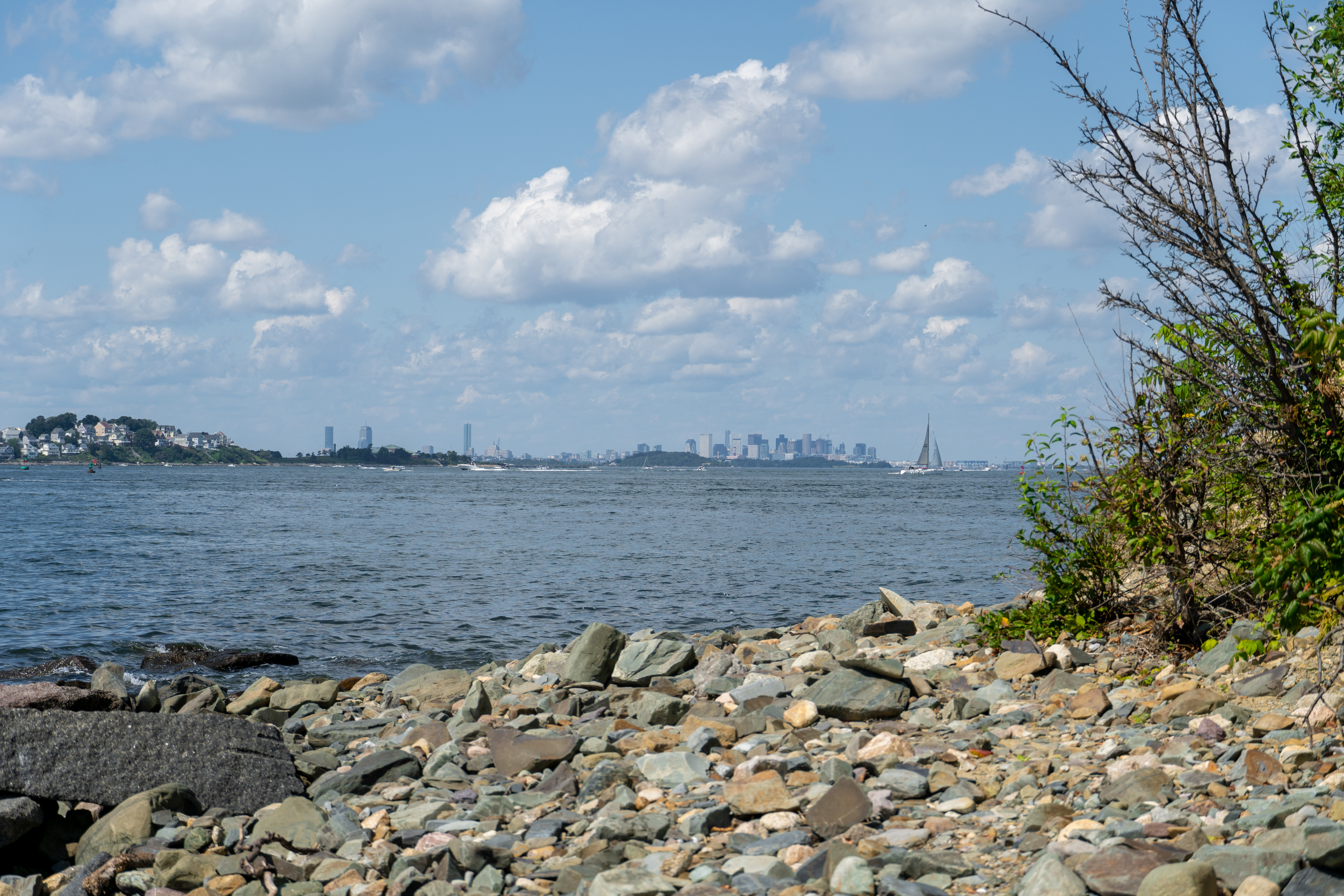
- Boston skyline from the park

- Location within Greater Boston area Location within Massachusetts Location within the United States
- Location: Weymouth, Massachusetts, United States
- Coordinates: 42°15′33″N 70°55′33″W
- Area: 59 acres (24 ha)
- Elevation: 33 ft (10 m)
- Established: 1980
- Administrator: Massachusetts Department of Conservation and Recreation
- Named for: William K. Webb
- Website: Official website

Webb Memorial State Park is a public recreation area located on a peninsula that extends nearly half a mile (800 m) into the Hingham Bay area of Boston Harbor in Massachusetts. It is composed of three connected drumlins and a low marsh area. The state park forms the only mainland portion of the Boston Harbor Islands National Recreation Area.

== History ==
In the 1860s, the peninsula became part of the Bradley Fertilizer factory and was used for dumping industrial waste. In the 1950s, it housed the missile launchers for a Nike missile site. The IFC (Integrated Fire Control) and radar systems for this site were located on Hog Island (now called Spinnaker Island) on the other side of Hingham Bay. The missile site was deactivated in 1974. In 1977, it was transferred to the Commonwealth of Massachusetts and work started on its conversion into a state park. Webb Memorial State Park opened in 1980. It was named for Weymouth police officer William Webb.

== Activities and amenities ==
The park offers skyline views of Boston, fishing, picnicking, and walking trails.
