= Telegraph Hill (Hull, Massachusetts) =

- U.S. National Register of Historic Places
- U.S. Historic district
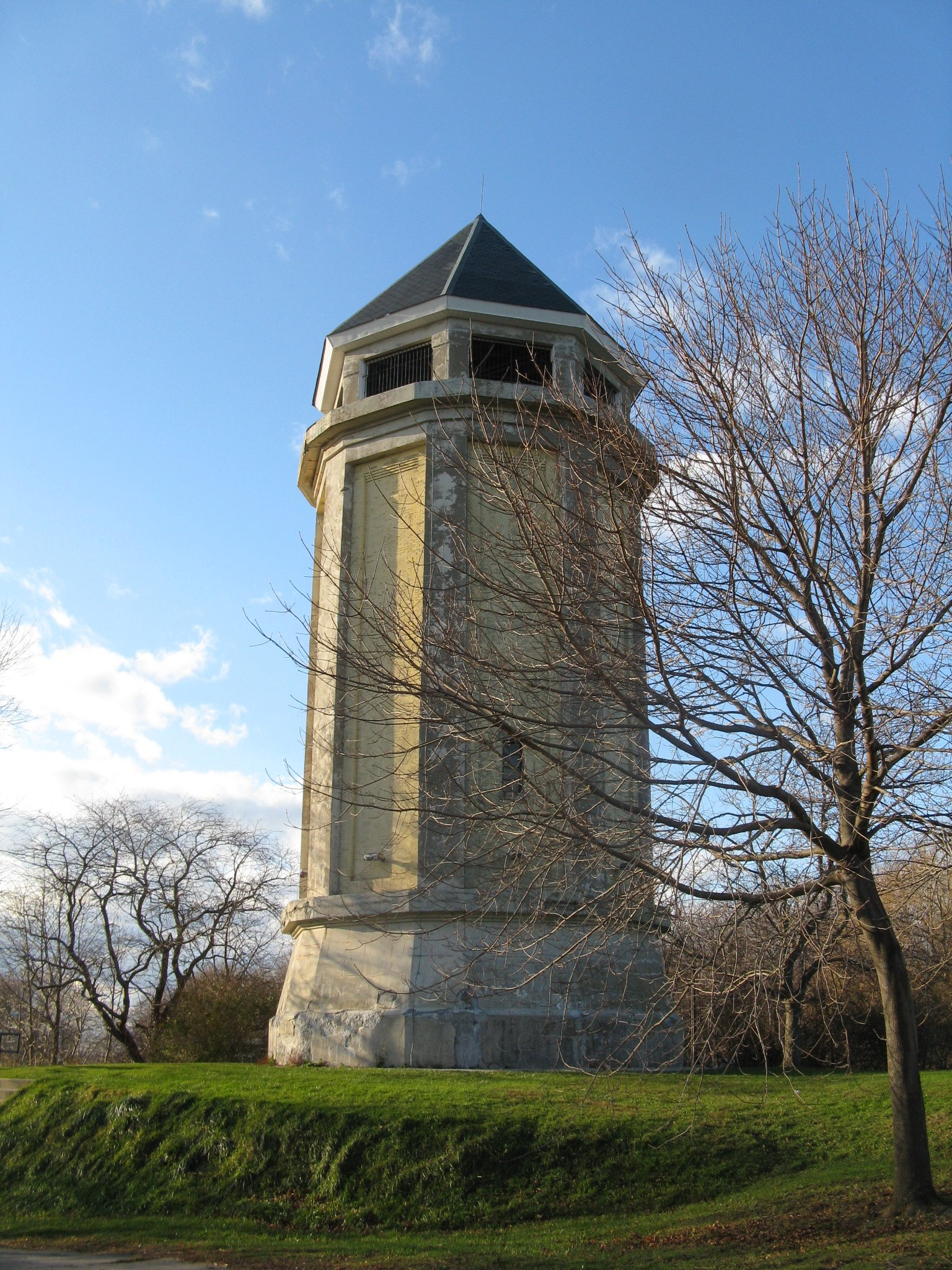
- 1903 tower on Telegraph Hill

- Location within Massachusetts Location within the United States
- Location: Hull, Massachusetts
- Coordinates: 42°18′15.6″N 70°54′15.8″W
- Built: 1776
- NRHP reference No.: 76000953
- Added to NRHP: July 12, 1976

Telegraph Hill is a historic site in Hull, Massachusetts. The site was added to the National Register of Historic Places in 1976. It is now part of Fort Revere Park.

== History ==
The site was first used as a fort in 1776 to defend the port of Boston. The first telegraph tower was built in 1827. Several other telegraph stations later occupied the site until 1938, when radio communications made the site obsolete.

In 1903, United States Government built a 120 foot high, 25 foot diameter reinforced concrete tower to contain a 20-foot diameter, 118,000-gallon steel water storage tank to serve Fort Revere. Erected by the Hennebique Construction Company, the tower was one of the earliest concrete water towers in the United States, and likely the first in New England. It also had a secondary benefit as an observation tower for the Army. The tower was restored in 1975 and designated an American Water Landmark in 2003. It was periodically open to the public until mid-2012 when it was closed due to safety concerns.

== See also ==
- National Register of Historic Places listings in Plymouth County, Massachusetts
