= Johnny Cupcakes =

American clothing company

Johnny Cupcakes, Inc.
- Company type: Privately held
- Industry: Apparel
- Founded: 2001
- Founder: Johnny Earle
- Headquarters: Weymouth, Massachusetts, United States
- Products: Clothing, Accessories
- Number of employees: 30
- Website: www.johnnycupcakes.com

Johnny Cupcakes, Inc. (commonly known as Johnny Cupcakes) is a clothing brand founded in 2001 by Johnny Earle. The clothing line uses cupcakes as the prominent design motif of its merchandise, often replacing iconic symbols with cupcakes. The brand's insignia is a play on skull and crossbones, with a cupcake silhouette replacing the skull.

The Johnny Cupcakes line includes T-shirts, shorts, sweaters, jewelry, undergarments, and pins. Its flagship store was located in Boston along with his online store, which ships worldwide.

== History ==
=== Origins ===
Earle says he initially started the Johnny Cupcakes brand "dewas Dewan". The clothing line has its origins back in 2000 when Earle worked at the Newbury Comics music shop in Braintree, Massachusetts. One day, co-worker Kingsley Wong gave him a new nickname, Johnny Cupcake, and it stuck.

In 2001, while ordering screen-printed shirts for the metalcore band he played in (On Broken Wings), Earle ran off a few shirts designed with the "Johnny Cupcakes" nickname. Almost immediately, co-workers and store customers noticed the cupcake-themed shirts whenever he wore them, and many inquired about how to purchase them. Sensing the demand, Earle started selling the shirts from the trunk of his car to local friends and acquaintances.

When On Broken Wings signed with a record label and began touring in 2002, Earle stuffed his suitcase full of Johnny Cupcakes shirts to sell at shows, and give to other musicians on the bill. This helped expose his designs to new audiences across the country, and the brand began to develop a cult following. The following year, Earle quit the band to focus full-time on his fledgling business.

=== Growth and success ===
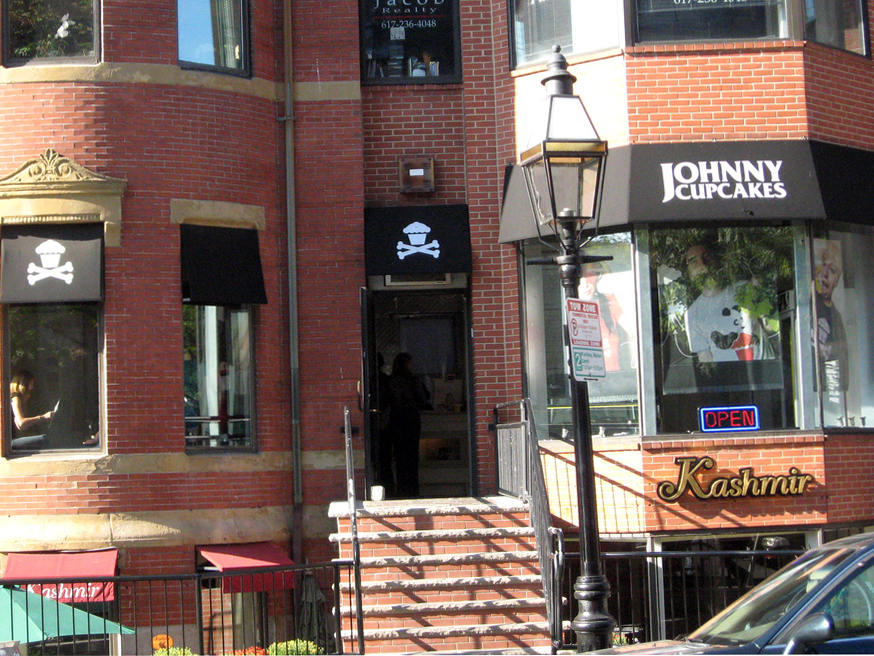
Johnny Cupcakes storefront on Newbury Street in Boston

In 2005, Earle opened the first Johnny Cupcakes store in his hometown of Hull after working with his father to convert it from a boat garage into a retail space. By this time, he had decided to keep his merchandise out of chain stores, and sell it exclusively through his own shops. After a year of growing sales and popularity, he opened another Johnny Cupcakes boutique on Boston's chic Newbury Street. The grand opening of the second location drew several hundred fans, and the store recorded five-figure sales revenues on the first day alone. Sadly, Earle's original Hull location closed its doors in 2015 after reportedly declining sales and higher rent in-town.

Wanting to deliver a unique customer experience, Earle designed his stores with a classic bakery motif. The interior decor at Johnny Cupcakes boutiques features antique refrigerators, baking racks, a 1930s dough mixer, (Boston location) a cast-iron wood-burning oven from the 1890s, (also at the Boston location) and even hidden vanilla-scented air fresheners; items are usually displayed on baking trays and inside glass pastry cases. The stores' prominent baking theme often confuses unfamiliar patrons who walk in thinking that they sell baked goods, not clothing. Earle says this tends to disappoint and even anger some passersby, though the shops do give out free cupcakes with purchases on occasion.

In 2008, a third Johnny Cupcakes store opened on Melrose Avenue in Los Angeles. To build the L.A. shop, Earle says he enlisted the help of an engineering firm that designed structures for the Disneyland and Universal Studios theme parks to "bring my crazy ideas to life." Similarly to the Boston location, the L.A. grand opening attracted hundreds of customers (including some who camped out for days beforehand) and saw the company's most successful single-day sales figures. Citing competition with his own online sales and the complexities of managing the location remotely, L.A. closed its doors in early 2016.

On March 12, 2011, the London store opened with hundreds of dedicated fans from around the world queuing up and camping for more than 24 hours. The queue stretched back to Regent Street and wrapped around the corner.

On June 16, 2012, Johnny Cupcakes opened on Circuit Ave, in the town of Oak Bluffs on the island of Martha's Vineyard, Massachusetts. This will primarily be a seasonal store, to replace the pop up shop that happened in a number of years previous.

In addition to the four retail locations, Johnny Cupcakes continues to sell items through its online store and a company "eBay Vault" which offers previously issued designs and exclusive items that were briefly or never available in its stores.

== Recognition ==
In 2008, Businessweek placed Earle at the top of its "Best Entrepreneurs 25 and Under" list, highlighting his company's quality products, imaginative promotion, and insistence on self-sustenance. The publication also cited Johnny Cupcakes' rising annual revenue and steadfast customer loyalty as further examples of Earle's notability as a business owner.

Earlier on, Johnny Cupcakes started getting noticed for its highly effective branding and "brazen" steps taken to make a name for itself. After the company's success in Boston and the greater New England area, Earle regularly received requests from high schools and universities to speak about entrepreneurship and running a small business. The demand for Earle to speak has grown so much recently that a separate "Lectures" section was created on his company web site in late 2009 to field inquiries.

In 2009, Johnny Cupcakes was placed at #237 on the Inc. 500 list of fastest growing private companies in the U.S. The magazine listed the clothing brand as having a nearly 915% growth rate over the previous year.

== Closure of Newbury Street Location ==
On December 13, 2024, Johnny Earle, via his Instagram account, announced that he was going to be winding down operations and eventually closing his flagship Newbury Street location

Citing several reasons that factored into his decision, Earle announced that he intended to pivot his professional career focus on becoming a "Fractional Chief Experience Officer"; expressing a desire to finish authoring the book he has been working on "for the past ten years"; and commencing operations on a subscription-based T-shirt sale distribution model, as well as several personal reasons that compelled him to reassess his focus and desire to continue operating the Johnny Cupcakes brand as-is going forward.

Earle has stated that although he has announced his plans to close, that, at least effective from December 13, 2024; "Until I find a Tennant to take over my space and settle on a move-in date, we are open", with no definitive closure date yet announced.
