= Spinnaker Island (Massachusetts) =

Island in Massachusetts, United States

Coordinates: 42°17′59.54″N 70°53′46.18″W

Spinnaker Island, looking westward, with World War II era gun position indicated by arrow.

Spinnaker Island (formerly known as Park Island, Hog Island, and Little Hog Island) is an island in the Hingham Bay area of Boston Harbor in Massachusetts, USA. The island is part of the town of Hull, to which it is connected by a bridge, and is one of the few harbor islands that neither forms part of the Boston Harbor Islands National Recreation Area nor is considered within the municipal limits of the city of Boston.

== History ==
In 1636 the Boston Board of Selectmen ordered that two town residents be given land in current day Winthrop, Massachusetts in exchange for them forgoing their rights to land on the island.

In 1920, Fort Duvall, a Coast Artillery fort, was constructed on Little Hog Island. A pair of 16-inch guns were emplaced on the island and later fortified with reinforced concrete casemates just prior to World War II. One of these fortifications is still visible under a condominium complex at the north end of the island, where it is currently used as parking space. The fort was declared surplus after the war.

In the 1950s, the island became the site of the Integrated Fire Control (IFC) and radar systems for a Nike missile site. The missile launchers were located in what is now the Webb Memorial State Park, on the other side of Hingham Bay. The missile site was deactivated in 1974 and the island was subsequently used by the Hull public school system.

In 1987, the island was redeveloped as a condominium and marina complex and renamed Spinnaker Island by the new owner.
