= USCGC Midgett =

USCGC Midgett has been the name of more than one United States Coast Guard ship, and may refer to:

- USCGC John Midgett (WHEC-726), launched in 1971 and decommissioned in 2020
- USCGC Midgett (WMSL-757), launched in 2017
