= CSB 8021 =

U.S. Coast Guard cutter

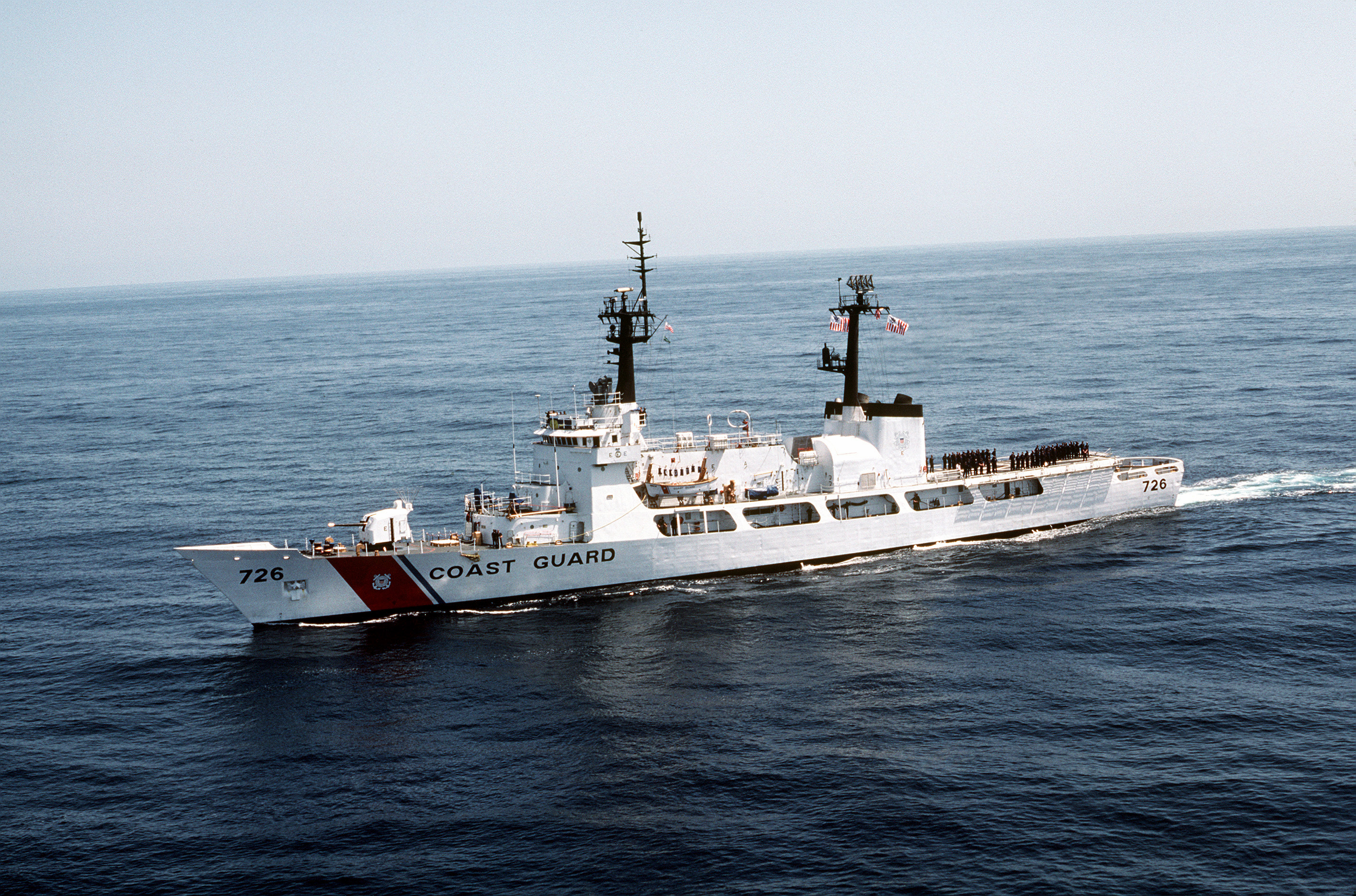
- USCGC John Midgett, unknown date

History

United States
- Name: USCGC John Midgett
- Namesake: Chief Warrant Officer John Allen Midgett, Jr.
- Operator: United States Coast Guard
- Builder: Avondale Shipyards
- Laid down: 5 April 1971
- Launched: 4 September 1971
- Commissioned: 17 March 1972
- Decommissioned: 2020
- Home port: Seattle, Washington
- Identification: MMSI number: 367279000; Callsign: NHWR
- Fate: Transferred to Vietnam Coast Guard
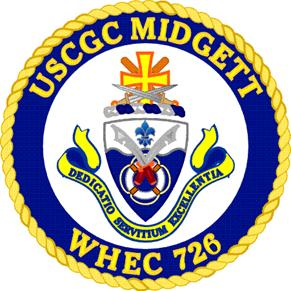
- Badge: Crest of the USCGC Midgett (before renamed)

Vietnam
- Name: CSB 8021
- Operator: Vietnam Coast Guard
- Acquired: June 2021
- Home port: Vũng Tàu, Vietnam
- Identification: MMSI number: 574120086; Callsign: JMG726
- Status: Active

General characteristics
- Class & type: Hamilton-class cutter
- Displacement: 3,050 tons
- Length: 378 ft (115 m)
- Beam: 42 ft (13 m)
- Draught: 18 ft (5.5 m)
- Propulsion: Two diesel engines and two gas turbine engines
- Speed: 29 kn (54 km/h; 33 mph)
- Range: 11,000 nmi (20,000 km; 13,000 mi)
- Endurance: 45 days
- Complement: 184 personnel (24 officers and 160 enlisted)
- Sensors & processing systems: AN/SPS-40 air-search radar AN/SPS-64V surface-search radar
- Electronic warfare & decoys: AN/WLR-1CG Countermeasures Receiver
- Armament: Otobreda 76 mm, Phalanx CIWS (CIWS system to be removed before transferring to Vietnam)

CSB 8021 is a Vietnamese coast guard boat. She served previously as the USCGC John Midgett (WHEC-726) and the USCGC Midgett (WHEC-726), and served as the twelfth and last of the United States Coast Guard's fleet of 378 ft (115 m) high endurance cutters. With her crew of 24 officers and 160 enlisted men and women, she was homeported in Seattle, Washington under the operational and administrative control of Commander, Pacific Area (COMPACAREA). Prior to Fleet Renovation and Maintenance (FRAM), the Midgett's homeport was Alameda, California.

Coast Guard Cutter Midgett's keel was laid April 5, 1971 at the Avondale Shipyard in New Orleans, Louisiana, and she was launched on September 4, 1971. She was commissioned on March 17, 1972. She had another commissioning ceremony on August 21, 1972 at Treasure Island in San Francisco Bay. This was soon after reaching her first home port of Alameda, California. The Midgett was decommissioned and placed in Fleet Renovation and Maintenance (FRAM) on January 7, 1991 and was placed in "In Commission Special" status as of April 25, 1992. She was fully re-commissioned in February 1993. She was a multipurpose ship, designed to meet the many and varied missions of today's Coast Guard. Her responsibilities included Homeland Security, Search and Rescue, Maritime Law Enforcement, and Alien Migrant Interdiction Operations as well as maintaining military readiness in support of NATO allies and the U.S. Navy. One of ten high endurance cutters on the west coast, her normal patrol areas included the Bering Sea, Gulf of Alaska and Central American waters, enforcing the Magnuson Fishery Conservation and Management Act (200-mile or 320-kilometre limit) and drug interdiction laws.

The Midgett appears on the cover of the 1979 Jefferson Starship album Freedom at Point Zero.

On 14 August 2020 the ship was transferred to the Vietnam Coast Guard and was commissioned as coastguard ship CSB 8021, joining its sister ship, the former USCGC Morgenthau (WHEC-722), now coastguard ship CSB 8020.

== Namesake ==
Midgett was the third ship in her class (HERO) to be named for outstanding Coast Guardsmen. Her namesake, the late Chief Warrant Officer John Allen "BOSN/Bosun" Midgett, Jr. was born in 1876 in Rodanthe, North Carolina, and served for nearly forty years with the United States Life-Saving Service and the Coast Guard. He was awarded the Gold Lifesaving Medal, the country's highest award for saving a life, for his heroic rescue of thirty six crewmen from the torpedoed British tanker Mirlo in 1918. Bos'n Midgett and his lifeboat crew rescued the entire crew, despite rough seas and flames from the tanker's cargo of refined oil and gasoline.

The Midgett family (earlier spelled Midgette and Midyett) has lived along the coast of Virginia and the Outer Banks of North Carolina for nearly three centuries, and has a long tradition in maritime service. John Allen "Bos'n" Midgett, Jr. was one of seven Midgett family members to have been awarded the Gold Lifesaving Medal. More than 150 living members of the Midgett family have made the Coast Guard a career, including more than thirty who are still on active duty.

== USCGC Midgett characteristics ==
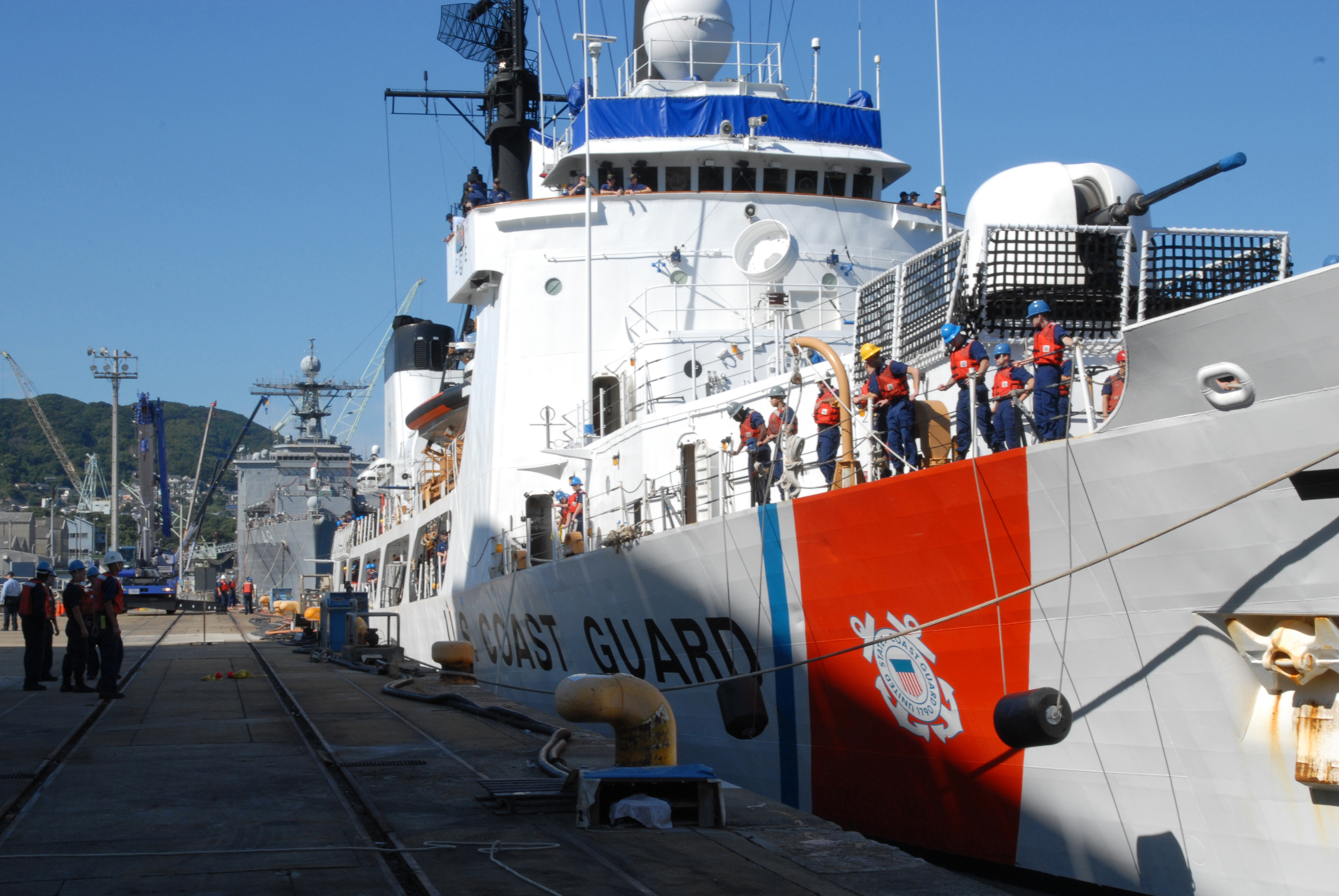
The USCGC Midgett docked in Sasebo, Japan

- Length: 378 feet (115 m)
- Beam: 42 feet (13 m)
- Draft: 18 feet (5.5 m)
- Max Speed: 29 knots (54 km/h; 33 mph)
- Econ Speed: 12 knots (22 km/h; 14 mph)
- Max Range: 11,000 nautical miles (20,000 km; 13,000 mi)
- Displacement: 3,050 short tons (2,770 t)
- Fuel Capacity: 215,000 US gallons (810,000 L; 179,000 imp gal)
- Water Capacity: 17,000 US gallons (64,000 L; 14,000 imp gal)
- Helo Fuel Capacity: 5,000 US gallons (19,000 L; 4,200 imp gal)
- Fresh Water Capacity: 10,000 US gallons (38,000 L; 8,300 imp gal) per day

Engines

- 2 Fairbanks Morse diesel engines 12 cylinders (3,500 horsepower or 2,600 kilowatts each)
- 2 Pratt-Whitney gas turbines
- 2 Controllable pitch propellers
- 1 Variable pitch/ Variable thrust, 360deg bow propulsion system

== Successor Midgett ==
As the Hero class cutters continue to be retired, the name Midgett will remain in use with USCGC Midgett (WMSL-757), a Legend-class National Security Cutter currently in service after being commissioned on August 24, 2019.
