= USCGC Kimball =

Cutter in the United States Coast Guard

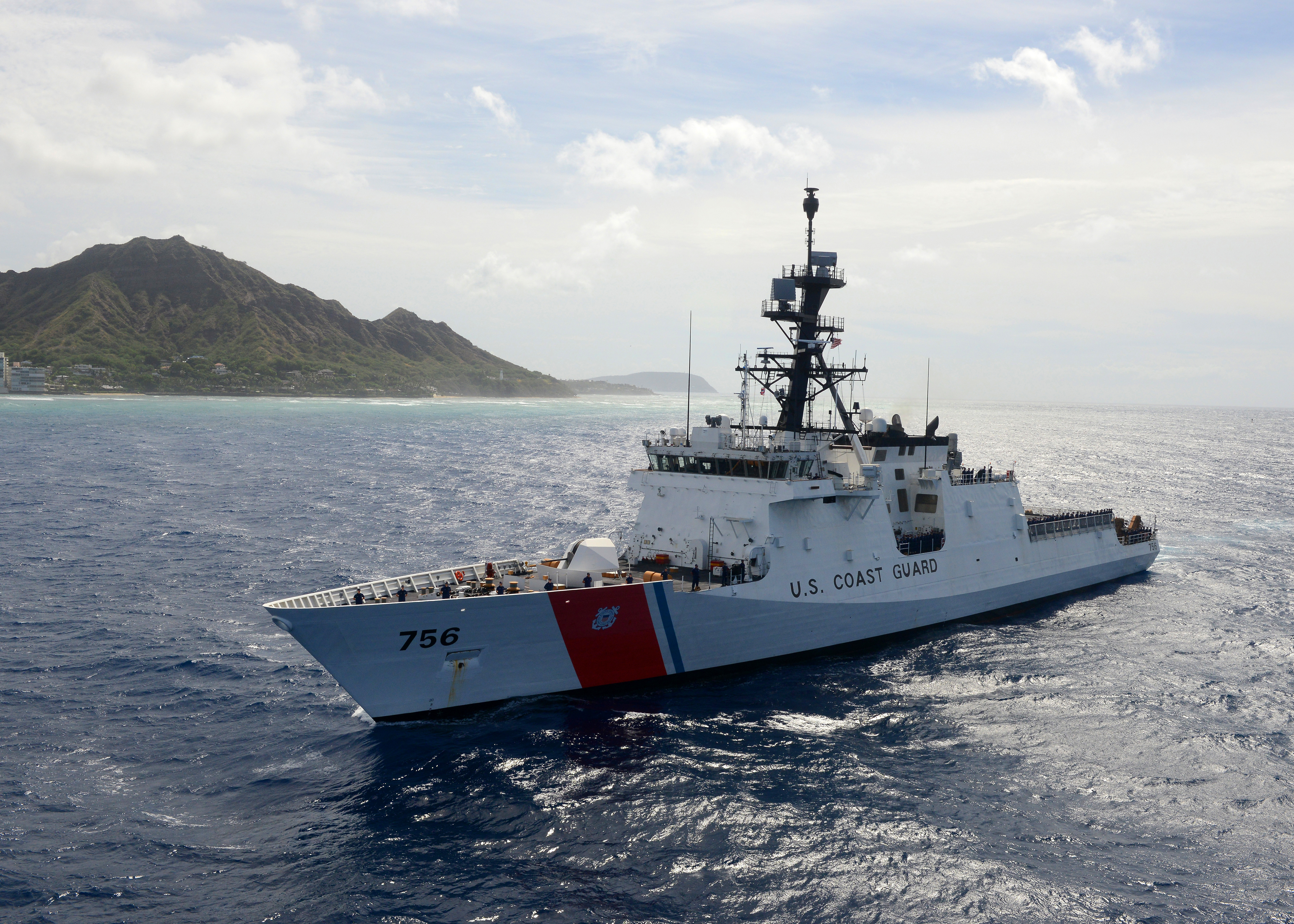

History

United States
- Name: Kimball
- Namesake: Sumner Increase Kimball
- Awarded: April 30, 2013
- Builder: Huntington Ingalls Industries, Pascagoula, Mississippi
- Cost: $487.1 Million
- Laid down: March 4, 2016
- Launched: December 17, 2016
- Sponsored by: Kay Webber Cochran, wife of Sen. Thad Cochran, R-Miss
- Christened: March 4, 2017
- Commissioned: August 24, 2019
- Home port: USCG Base Honolulu, HI
- Identification: MMSI number: 303867000; Callsign: NKAY
- Motto: "DIRIGO ∙DISCIPLINA ∙ SERVO" or Latin for "Lead ∙Train ∙Save"
- Status: In service
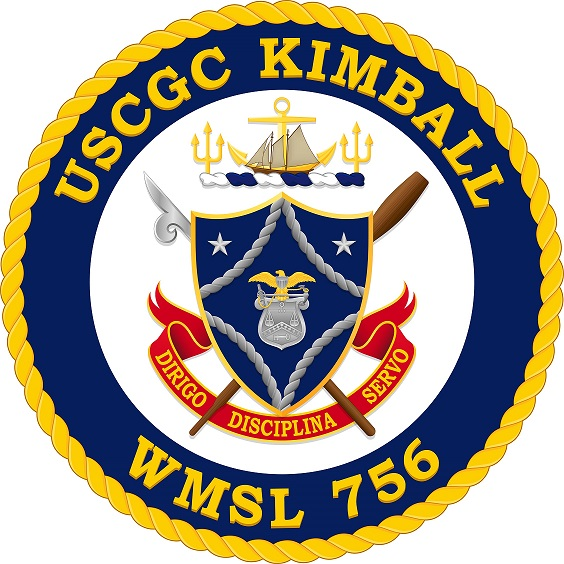
- Badge

General characteristics
- Class & type: Legend-class cutter
- Type: National Security Cutter
- Displacement: 4500 LT
- Length: 418 ft (127 m)
- Beam: 54 ft (16 m)
- Height: 140 ft (43 m)
- Draft: 22.5 ft (6.9 m)
- Decks: 4
- Propulsion: Combined diesel and gas
- Speed: 28+ knots
- Range: 12,000 nm
- Endurance: 60-90 days
- Complement: 111 (15 Officers, 15 CPO, 81 Enlisted) and can carry up to 148 depending on mission
- Sensors & processing systems: EADS 3D TRS-16 AN/SPS-75 Air Search Radar; SPQ-9B Fire Control Radar; AN/SPS-73 Surface Search Radar; AN/SLQ-32
- Electronic warfare & decoys: AN/SLQ-32 Electronic Warfare System; 2 SRBOC/ 2 x NULKA countermeasures chaff/rapid decoy launcher
- Armament: 1 x MK 110 57mm gun a variant of the Bofors 57 mm gun and Gunfire Control System; 1 × 20 mm Block 1B Phalanx Close-In Weapons System; 4 × .50 caliber machine guns; 2 × M240B 7.62 mm machine guns
- Armor: Ballistic protection for main gun
- Aircraft carried: 1 x MH-65C Dolphin MCH x 2 sUAS
- Aviation facilities: 50-by-80-foot (15 m × 24 m) flight deck, hangar for all aircraft

USCGC Kimball (WMSL-756) is the seventh Legend-class cutter of the United States Coast Guard. Kimball is named for Sumner Increase Kimball, who was the organizer of the United States Life-Saving Service and the General Superintendent of the Life-Saving Service from 1878–1915.

== History ==
Original planned commission ceremony was on January 19, 2019, but ceremony cancelled due to the government shutdown. On August 24, 2019, Kimball was commissioned in Honolulu with USCGC Midgett.

== See also ==
- Legend-class cutter
- Integrated Deepwater System Program
