= Point Allerton Lifesaving Station =

- U.S. National Register of Historic Places
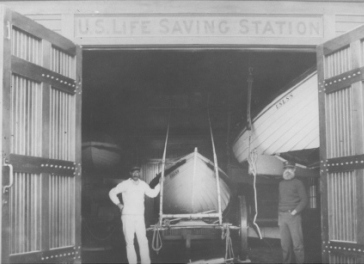
- Point Allerton Lifesaving Station in 1895

- Location within Massachusetts Location within the United States
- Location: Hull, Massachusetts
- Coordinates: 42°18′20″N 70°54′1″W
- Built: 1889
- Architect: US Corps of Engineers
- Architectural style: Queen Anne
- NRHP reference No.: 81000110
- Added to NRHP: June 11, 1981

Point Allerton Lifesaving Station is a historic building of the United States Life-Saving Service at 1117 Nantasket Avenue in Hull, Massachusetts. The service was eventually merged with the Revenue Cutter Service to form the United States Coast Guard. The Queen Anne style station was built in 1889 by the United States Army Corps of Engineers. It is a minimally-decorated building, scaled to fit into the surrounding residential area. Its first commander was Hull native Joshua James, whose heroic career in lifesaving is detailed in the museum. Keeper William Sparrow commanded the station through its transition to the United States Coast Guard in 1915.

The structure was added to the National Register of Historic Places in 1981. It is the best-preserved of 32 stations that once lined the Massachusetts coast (most have since been demolished or adapted to other uses). It is now operated as the Hull Lifesaving Museum.

== See also ==
- National Register of Historic Places listings in Plymouth County, Massachusetts
- List of maritime museums in the United States
