= Sumner Increase Kimball =

American politician

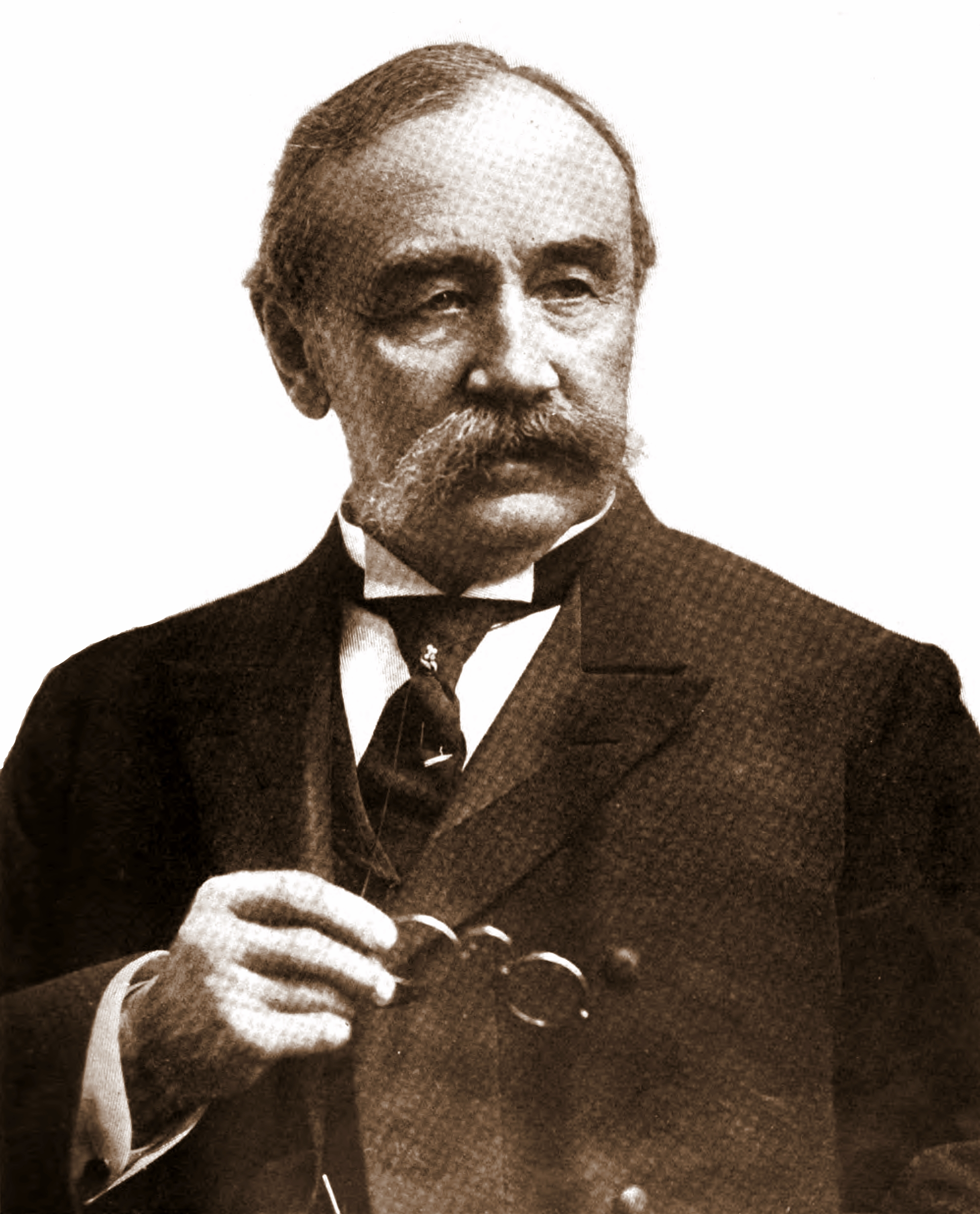

General Superintendent of the United States Life-Saving Service
- In office 1878–1915
- Preceded by: Office created
- Succeeded by: Office abolished

Member of the Maine House of Representatives
- In office 1859–1861

Personal details
- Born: September 2, 1834 Lebanon, Maine, United States
- Died: June 20, 1923 (aged 88) Washington, D.C., United States
- Education: Bowdoin College

Sumner Increase Kimball (September 2, 1834 – June 20, 1923) was the organizer of the United States Life-Saving Service and the General Superintendent of the Life-Saving Service from 1878 to 1915. Originally a lawyer and a legislative administrator, Kimball spent his life creating and leading the Life-Saving Service, one of the predecessor services that eventually became the U.S. Coast Guard, transforming it from an uneven collection of facilities round the U.S. coastline into a coherent and well-trained organization.

== Biography ==
Sumner Increase Kimball was born in Lebanon, Maine, on September 2, 1834. Raised in Sanford, Maine, he graduated from Bowdoin College in 1855, and was admitted to the bar in 1858. He was elected to the Maine House of Representatives in 1859.

He became a clerk in the United States Treasury Department in 1862, and was placed in charge of the Revenue Marine Bureau there in 1871. When the Life-Saving Bureau was organized in 1878 he was appointed its head. Under his direction, the Life-Saving Service was extended to the Pacific Coast and the Great Lakes. He served as superintendent of the Lifesaving Service for 37 years.

Kimball also served in several other positions at the Treasury Department (acting Register, acting Comptroller, acting Solicitor). He was the author of Organization and Methods of the United States Life-Saving Service (1889) and Joshua James: Life-Saver (1909).

He died at his home in Washington, D.C., on June 20, 1923.

== Legacy ==
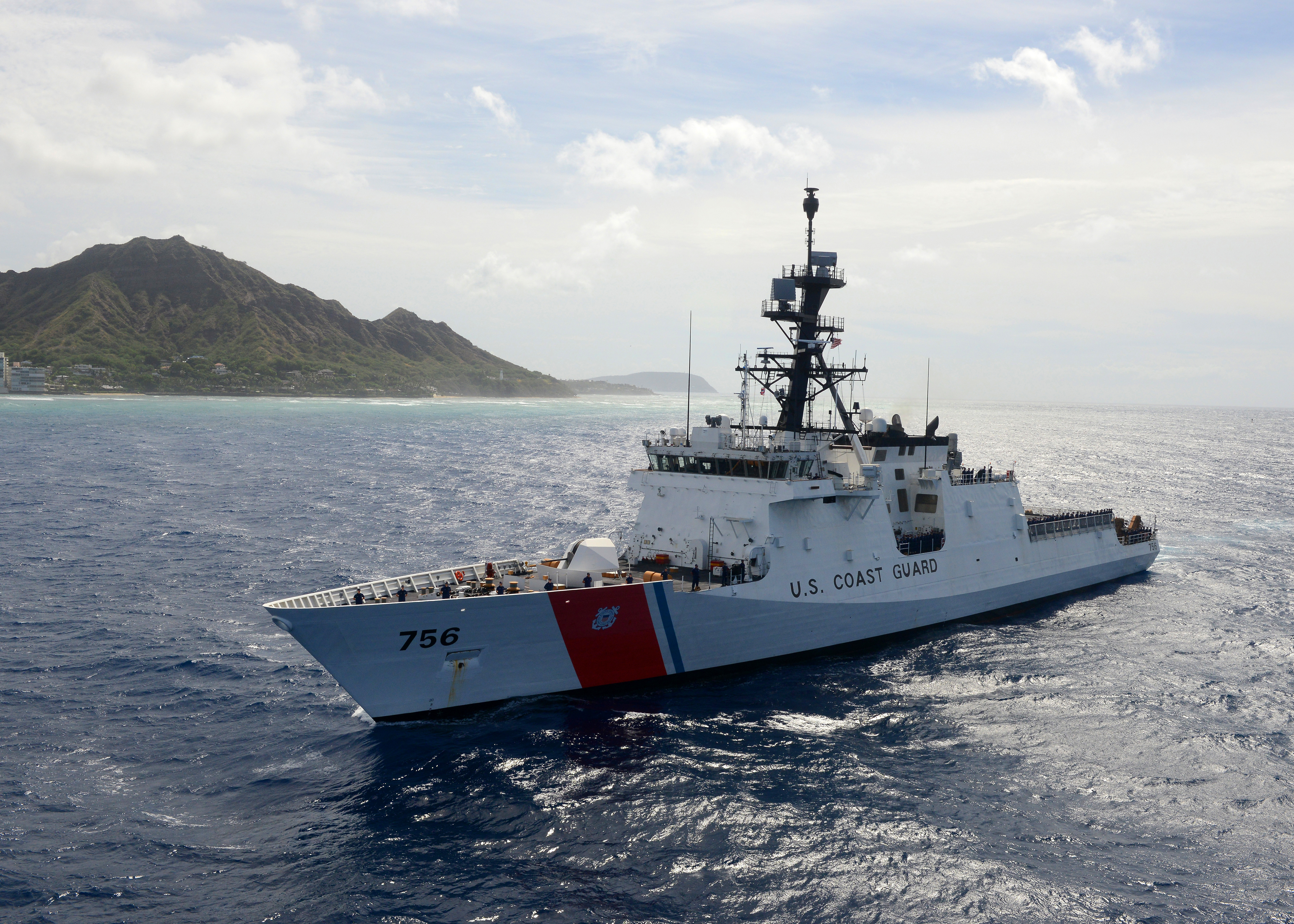
USCGC Kimball (WMSL-756) sailing near Hawaii, August 2019

The Coast Guard cutter USCGC Kimball (WMSL-756) is named in Kimball's honor. She is a Legend-class cutter, also known as a National Security Cutter. As of 2022, these are the largest and most capable cutters in the Coast Guard fleet. They can perform a wide array of law enforcement duties, as well coastal defense and anti-terrorism if needed. They can also be called upon by the Department of Defense to work with the U.S. Navy in a both a national defense capacity, as well as performing military missions overseas.
