= Massachusetts Humane Society =

Charitable organization

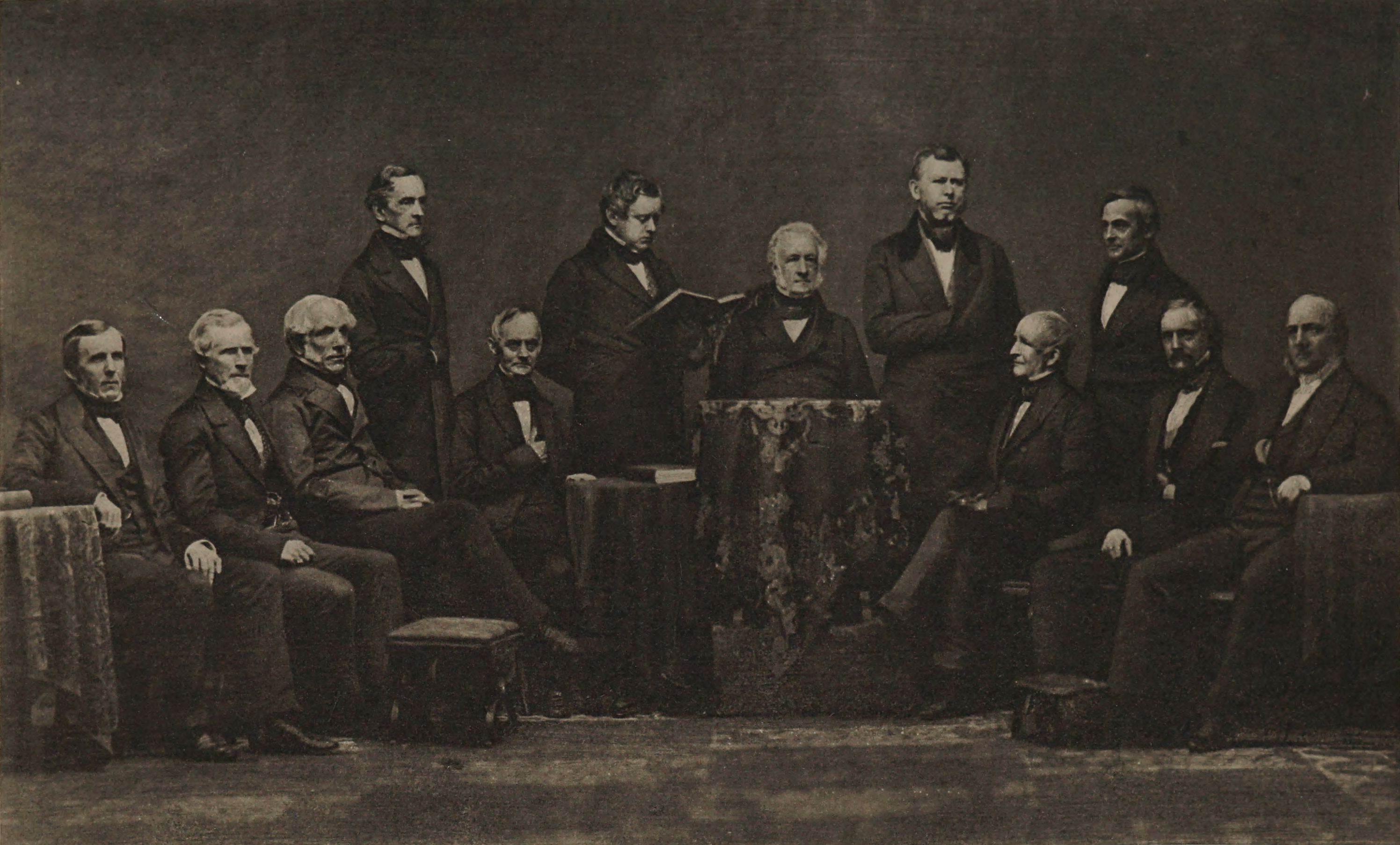
Trustees of the Massachusetts Humane Society. 1858.

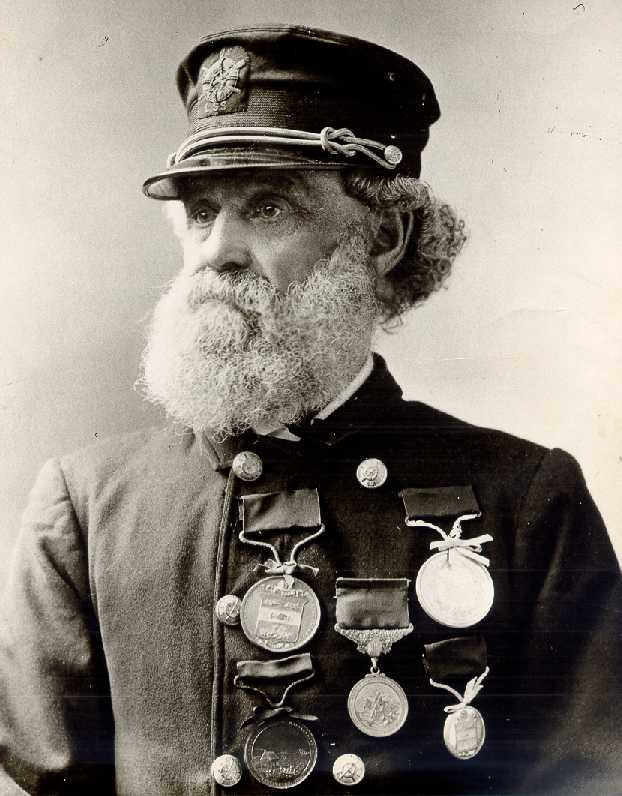
Captain Joshua James, volunteer

The Humane Society of the Commonwealth of Massachusetts, better known as the Massachusetts Humane Society was founded in 1786 by a group of Boston citizens who were concerned about the needless deaths resulting from shipwrecks and drownings and wanted to find ways to save lives. It was based on the Royal Humane Society, a similar organization established in Great Britain in 1774. The Massachusetts Humane Society became the model for the United States Life-Saving Service funded by Congress in 1848 and operated by the United States Coast Guard since 1915.

Its first lifesaving activities consisted of publishing procedures for dealing with victims of shipwreck and other water-related accidents, and the placement of lifesaving equipment, lifeboats, and shelters on the islands and coast of Massachusetts Bay. It also offered rewards to individuals who successfully rescued people from the state's waters. By the early 20th century the society operated more than 50 support stations along the state's coast, and provided all manner of equipment for the use of rescuers.

In the 1810s the society was a major funding source for the establishment of Massachusetts General Hospital and an "Asylum for the Insane" which included what is now known as McLean Hospital.

The Society continued to operate lifeboats after the United States Life-Saving Service was founded in 1871, and after the USLSS and the United States Revenue Cutter Service merged in 1915 to form the United States Coast Guard. However, as the USCG took more responsibility for life-saving off-shore, the Society shifted to life-saving on beaches, rivers, and ponds. The Society disposed of its last lifeboats and stations in 1946.

The Society's current focus continues to be on water-based lifesaving activities and general medical facilities. It still gives awards for rescues, and funds other organizations engaged in lifesaving activities.

== Bibliography ==
- Claflin, James W (2014). Lighthouses and Life Saving Along Cape Cod. Mount Pleasant, SC: Arcadia Publishing. ISBN 978-1-4671-2213-9.
- Goss, George Edward (1916). Life Saving. London: Association Press.
- Willoughby, Malcolm F (1957). The U.S. Coast Guard in World War II. Annapolis, MD: United States Naval Institute.
