= USCGC James =

Legend-class cutter of the U.S. Coast Guard

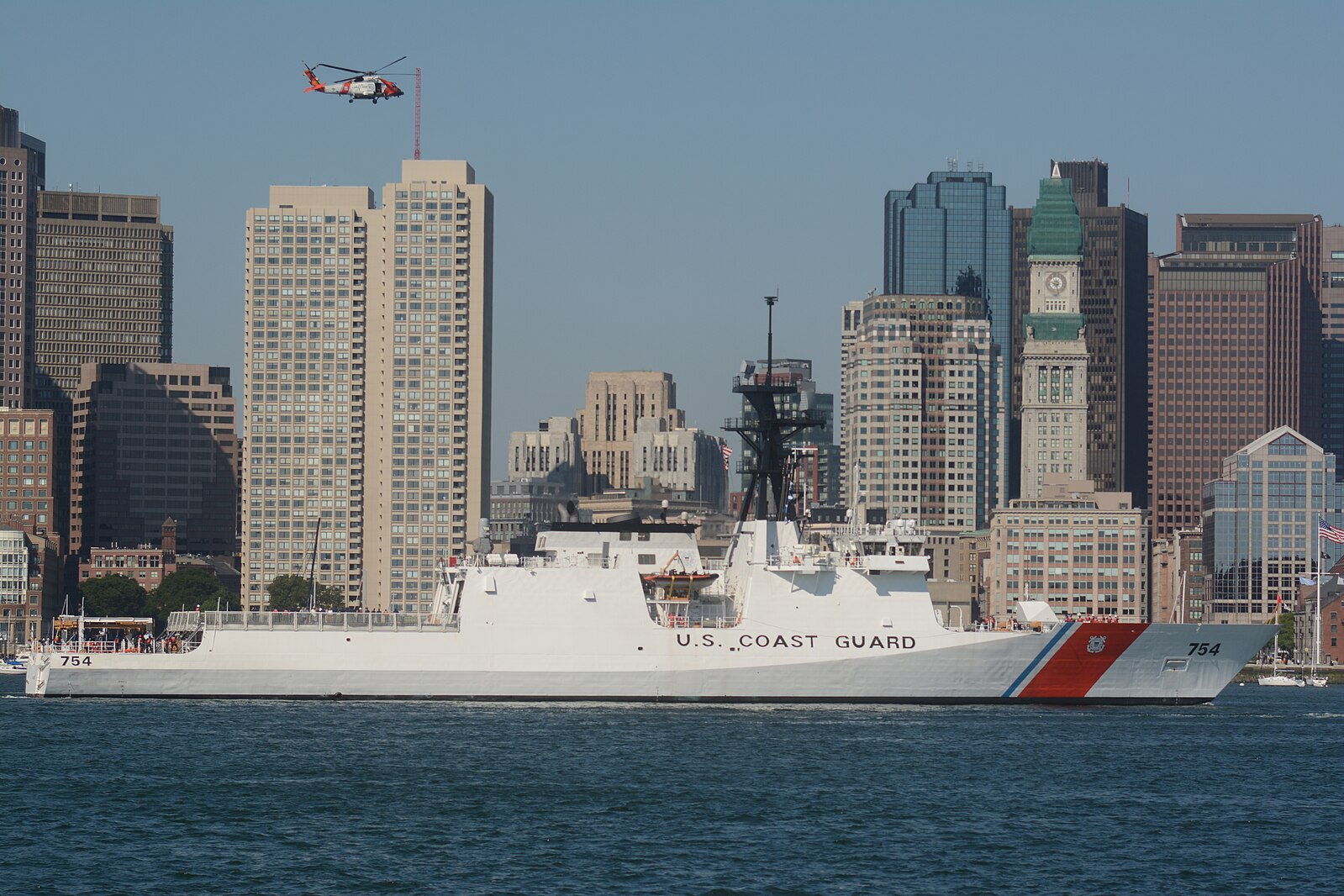
- James arriving in Boston for her commissioning August 8, 2015.

History

United States
- Name: James
- Namesake: Joshua James
- Awarded: September 9, 2011
- Builder: Huntington Ingalls Industries, Pascagoula, Mississippi, U.S.
- Cost: $482.8 Million
- Laid down: May 17, 2013
- Launched: May 3, 2014
- Sponsored by: Charlene Benoit
- Christened: August 16, 2014
- Acquired: June 15, 2015
- Commissioned: August 8, 2015
- Home port: Charleston, South Carolina
- Identification: MMSI number: 368884000; Callsign: NJAM
- Status: In service
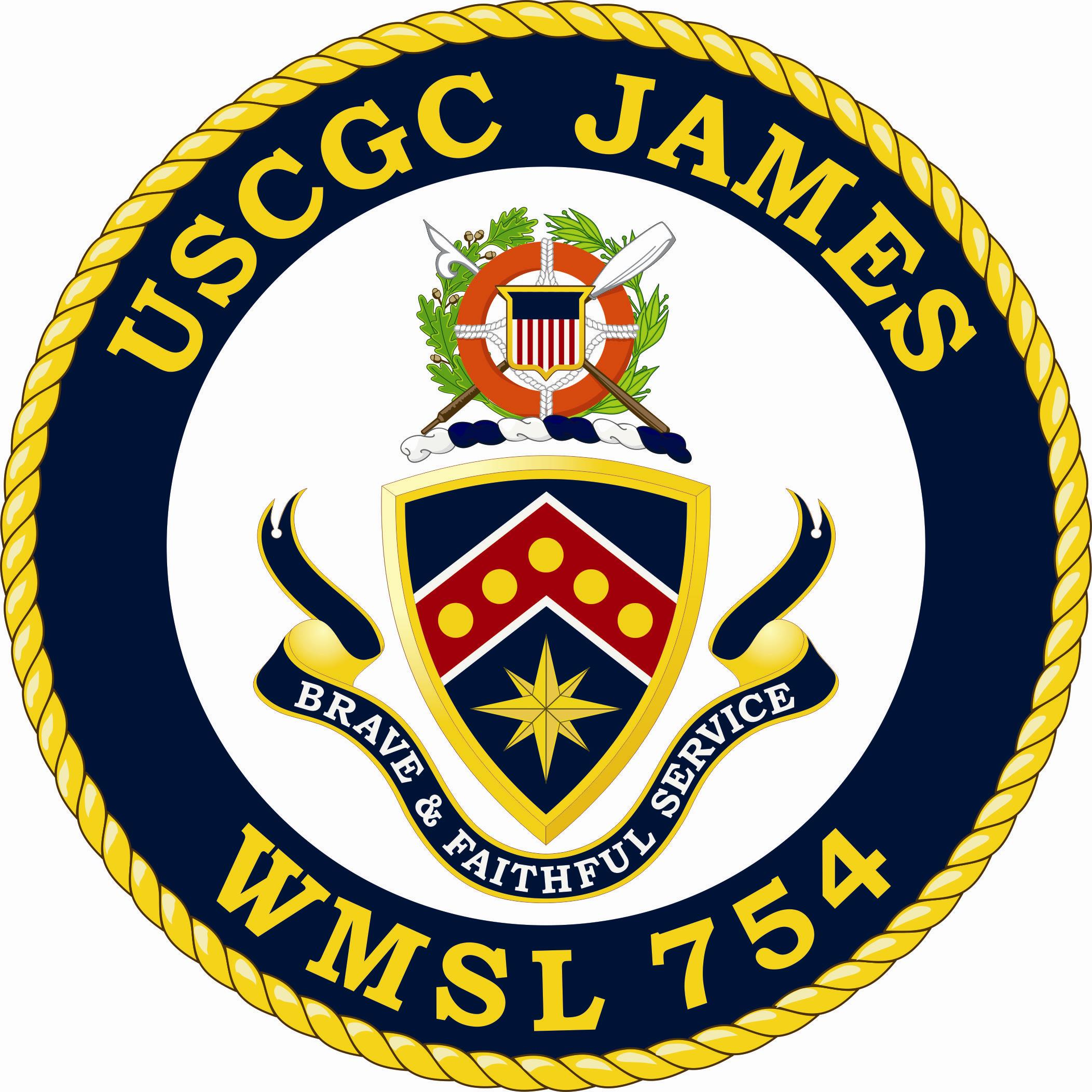
- Badge

General characteristics
- Displacement: 4500 LT
- Length: 418 ft (127 m)
- Beam: 54 ft (16 m)
- Height: 140 ft (43 m)
- Draft: 22.5 ft (6.9 m)
- Decks: 4
- Propulsion: Combined diesel and gas
- Speed: 28+ knots
- Range: 12,000 nm
- Endurance: 60 days
- Complement: 111 (15 Officers, 15 CPO, 81 Enlisted) and can carry up to 148 depending on mission
- Sensors & processing systems: EADS 3D TRS-16 AN/SPS-75 Air Search Radar; SPQ-9B Fire Control Radar; AN/SPS-79 Surface Search Radar; AN/SLQ-32
- Electronic warfare & decoys: AN/SLQ-32 Electronic Warfare System; 2 SRBOC/ 2 x NULKA countermeasures chaff/rapid decoy launcher
- Armament: 1 x MK 110 57mm gun a variant of the Bofors 57 mm gun and Gunfire Control System; 1 × 20 mm Block 1B Phalanx Close-In Weapons System; 4 × .50 caliber machine guns; 2 × M240B 7.62 mm machine guns
- Armor: Ballistic protection for main gun
- Aircraft carried: 2 x MH-65C Dolphin MCH, or 4 x VUAV or 1 x MH-65C Dolphin MCH and 2 x VUAV
- Aviation facilities: 50-by-80-foot (15 m × 24 m) flight deck, hangar for all aircraft

USCGC James (WMSL-754) is the fifth Legend-class cutter of the United States Coast Guard.

== Etymology ==
USCGC James is named for Joshua James (1826–1902), an American sea captain and a U.S. Life-Saving Service station keeper credited with saving over 600 lives.

== History ==
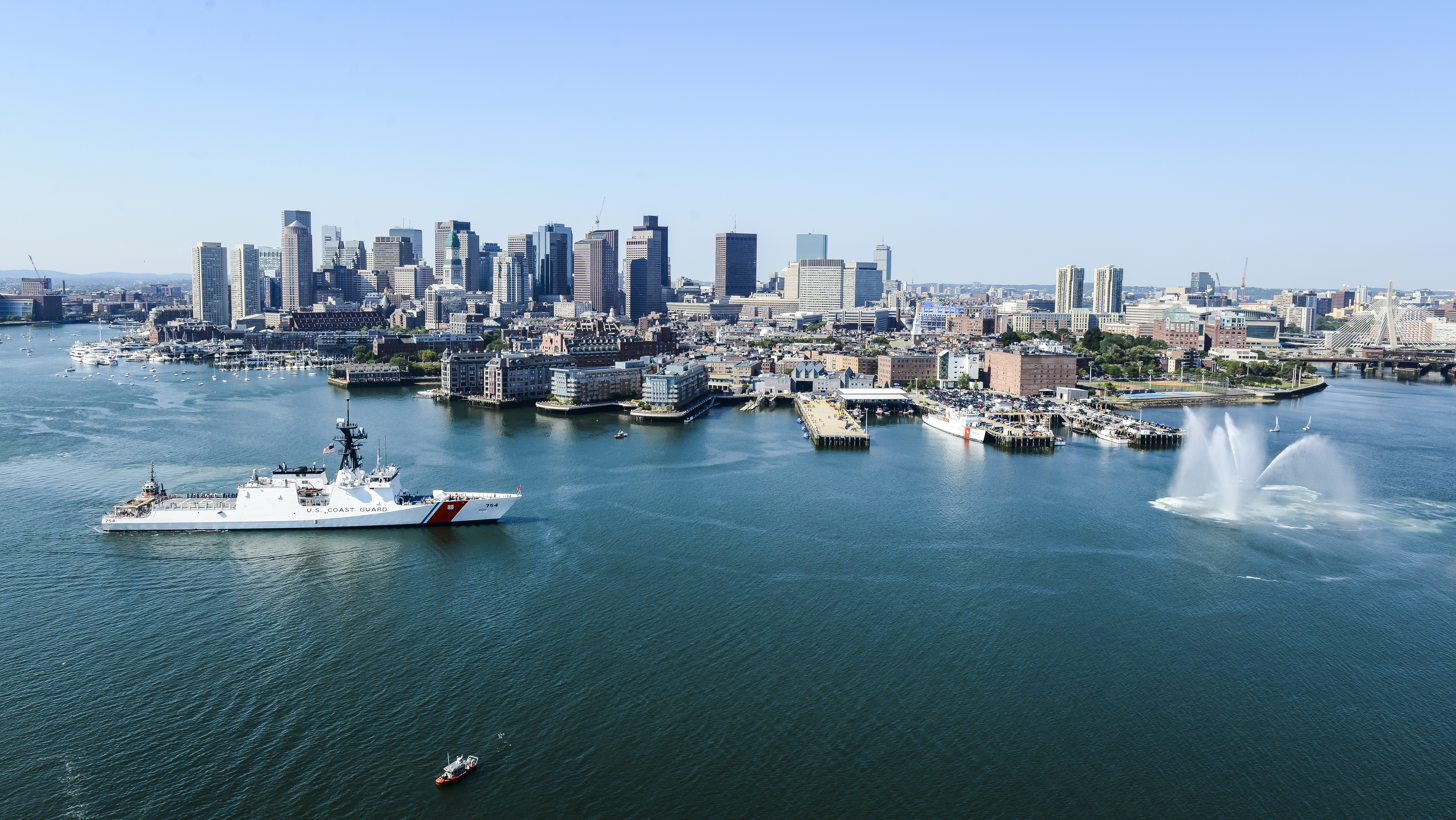
USCGC James pulls into Boston Harbor in August 2015

Huntington Ingalls Industries, Ingalls Shipyard in Pascagoula, Mississippi was awarded the $482.8 million construction contract September 9, 2011. Construction officially began May 14, 2012 with the ceremony marking the cutting of the first 100 tons of steel. The keel was laid on May 17, 2013. The cutter's sponsor is James' great great niece, Charlene Benoit. She is the great grand daughter of Joshua James' brother, Samuel James.

James was launched on May 3, 2014. She was christened August 16, 2014 and was commissioned in Boston on August 8, 2015.

James served as a command and control platform in San Juan, Puerto Rico, Sept. 25, 2017. The cutter's crew deployed to aid in Hurricane Maria response operations and the ship's communications capabilities were used to help first responders coordinate efforts on the island.

On August 8, 2022, James was damaged when the cutter ran aground while underway. After an investigation Captain Marc Brandt was permanently relieved of duties as the commanding officer of James.

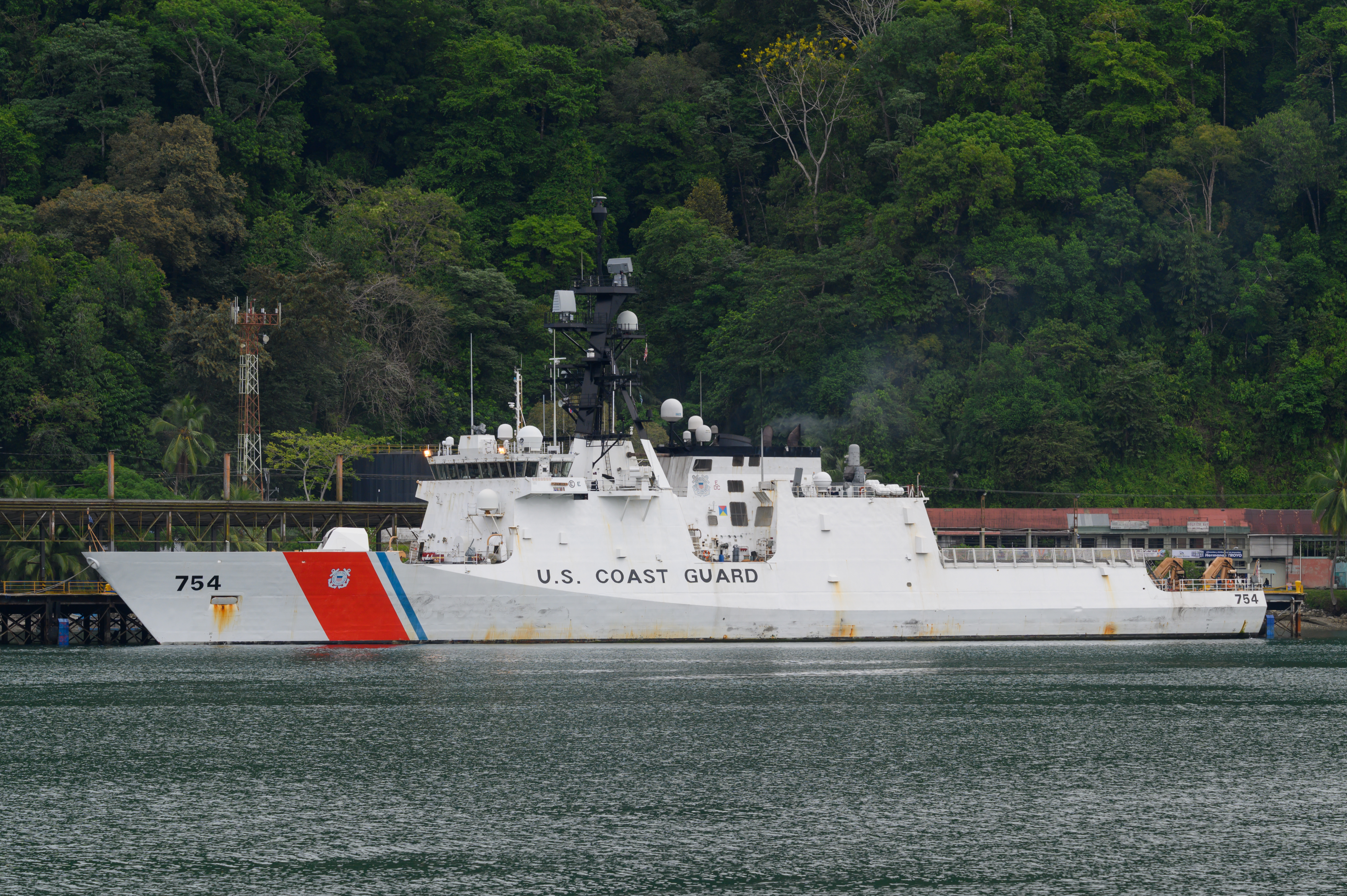
United States Coast Guard cutter, USCGC James, in the harbor at Golfito, Costa Rica.

In April 2024, James will deploy to Argentina for training exercise against illegal fishing with the Prefectura Naval Argentina but all of this lacks the authorization of Argentine Congress, required by law 25,880 on the entry of foreign military personnel. The ship that arrived in Buenos Aires on April 29, 2024 does not have authorization from Argentine Congress, as required by law, although there are controversies about this interpretation of the law .

== See also ==
- Legend-class cutter
- USCGC Bertholf (WMSL-750)
- USCGC Waesche (WMSL-751)
- USCGC Stratton (WMSL-752)
- USCGC Hamilton (WMSL-753)
- Integrated Deepwater System Program
