= Harding's Ledge =

Shoal in the Atlantic Ocean in Massachusetts, US

Coordinates: 42.30427°N 70.84671°W

Harding's Ledge, also known as Harding Ledge, is a shoal in the Atlantic Ocean located on the approach to Boston Harbor, 1.5 miles east of Point Allerton, in Hull, Massachusetts, United States. The shoal is exposed at low tide and has been the site of numerous shipwrecks. A lighted bell buoy located 0.3 miles northeast guides boats around the outside of the shoal.
