= John Allen Midgett Jr. =

United States Coast Guardsman

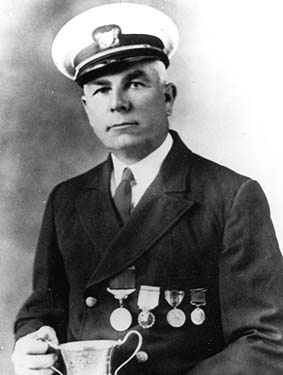
- John Allen Midgett was recognized by the UK government for saving UK seamen in 1918.
- Born: August 25, 1876; Rodanthe, North Carolina
- Died: February 9, 1938 (aged 61); Norfolk, Virginia

John Allen Midgett Jr. (August 25, 1876 – February 9, 1938) was a senior enlisted member of first the United States Life-Saving Service, and later the United States Coast Guard.

== Biography ==
Midgett grew up on Cape Hatteras, on the Outer Banks of the North Carolina coast, and, like his father and other family members, he enlisted in the United States Life-Saving Service in 1898. Midgett remained in command of a life-saving station when the United States Revenue Cutter Service merged with the United States Life-Saving Service to form the United States Coast Guard in 1915.

On August 16, 1918, Midgett was the keeper of the Chicamacomico Lifeboat Station when he led his power surfboat crew on the celebrated rescue of the 42 crew members of the British tanker Mirlo. The United Kingdom Board of Trade awarded Midgett a silver cup in 1918, and he was awarded the U.S. Coast Guard Gold Lifesaving Medal six years later.

Midgett was injured in an automobile accident in late 1937 and died on February 9, 1938.

== Legacy ==
According to the Dictionary of North Carolina Biography Midgett was friends with Franklin Delano Roosevelt, and his funeral was attended by a number of congressmen.

The Coast Guard dedicated the USCGC Midgett to his service and commissioned it on March 17, 1972. The last of the Hamilton-class, in the early 1990s, the vessel was modernized to extend service. Later, in 2018, the Coast Guard renamed her to the USCGC John Midgett, freeing the vessel name for a new Legend-class cutter. That next year, the USCGC Midgett (WMSL-757) was commissioned into service, carrying the name for another generation.
