= USCGC Midgett (WMSL-757) =

Legend-class cutter in the United States Coast Guard

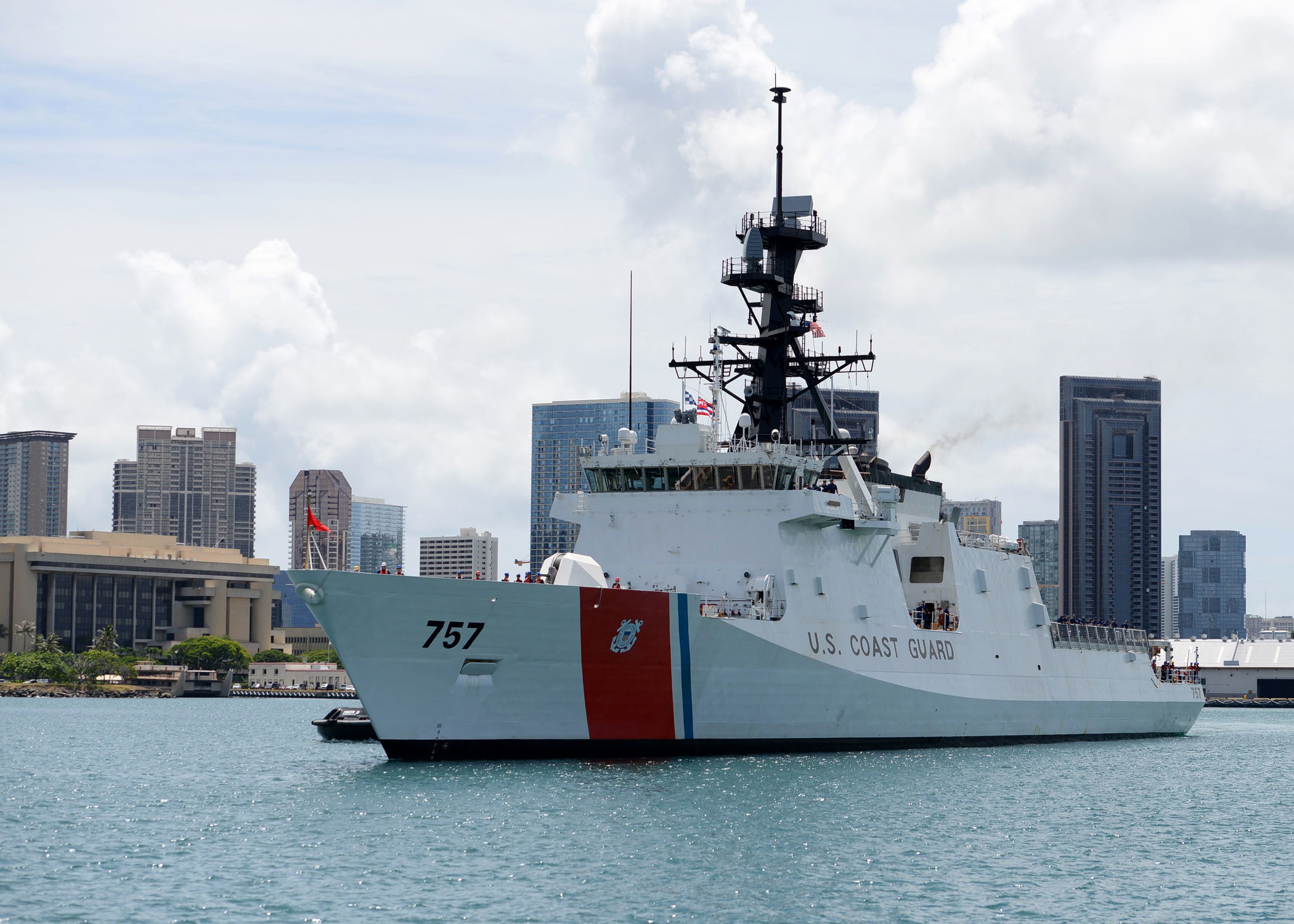

History

United States
- Name: Midgett
- Awarded: March 31, 2015
- Builder: Huntington Ingalls Industries, Pascagoula, Mississippi
- Cost: $499.76 Million
- Laid down: January 30, 2017
- Launched: November 22, 2017
- Sponsored by: Jazania H. O’Neal
- Christened: December 9, 2017
- Commissioned: August 24, 2019
- Identification: MMSI number: 303868000; Callsign: NCJM
- Motto: "A Legacy of Bravery"
- Status: In Service
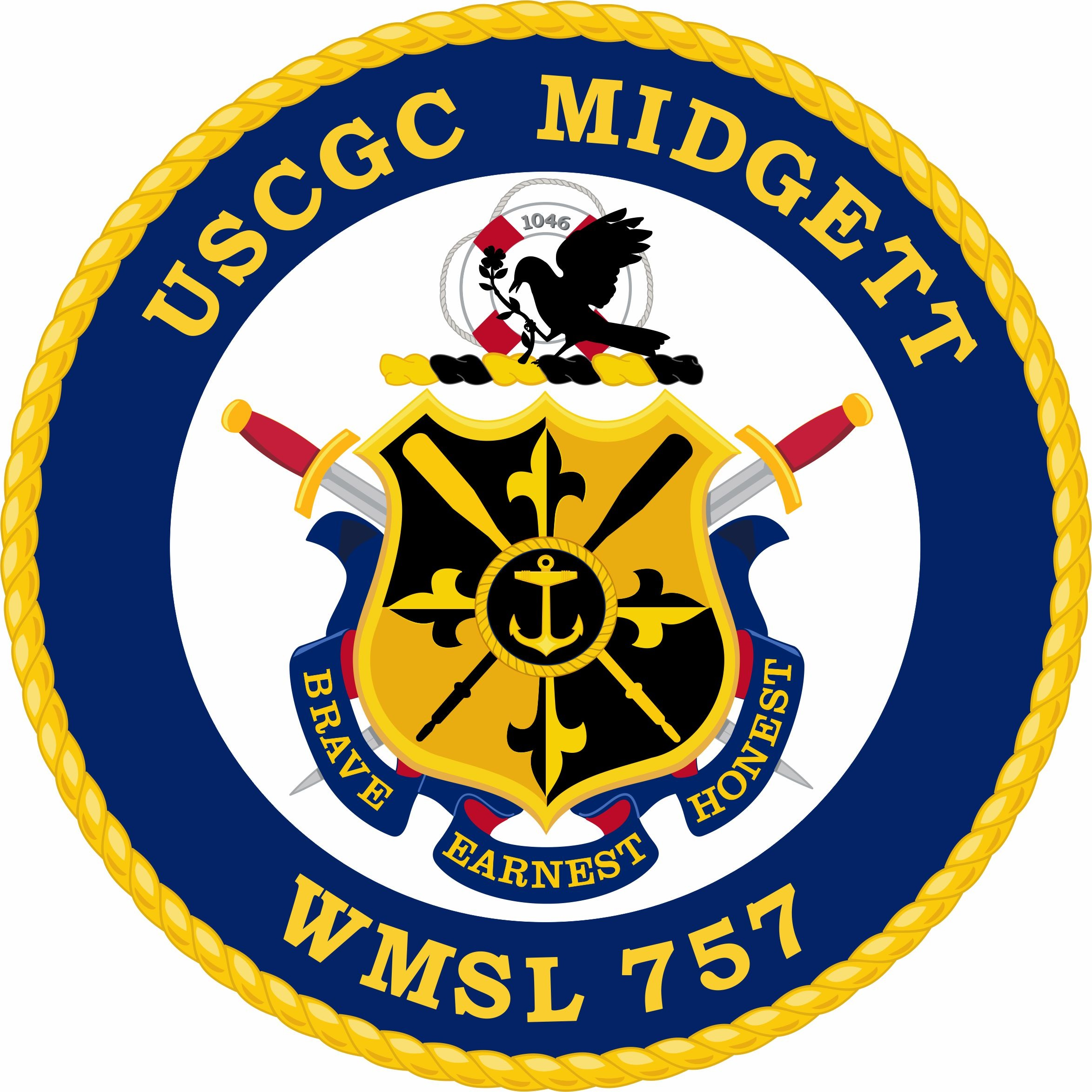
- Badge

General characteristics
- Class & type: Legend-class cutter
- Displacement: 4500 LT
- Length: 418 ft (127 m)
- Beam: 54 ft (16 m)
- Draft: 22.5 ft (6.9 m)
- Propulsion: Combined diesel and gas
- Speed: 28 knots
- Range: 12,000 nm
- Endurance: 60 to 90-day patrol cycles
- Complement: 148
- Sensors & processing systems: AN/SPS-75 Air Search Radar; SPQ-9B Fire Control Radar; AN/SPS-79 Surface Search Radar
- Electronic warfare & decoys: AN/SLQ-32 Electronic Warfare System; 2 x Mk-36 SRBOC/ 2 x Mk-53 NULKA countermeasures chaff/rapid decoy launcher
- Armament: 1 x Mk-110 57mm Naval Gun System (variant of the Bofors 57 mm gun); 1 × 20 mm Block 1B Phalanx Close-In Weapons System; 4 × .50 caliber machine guns; 2 × M240B 7.62 mm machine guns
- Armor: Ballistic protection for main gun
- Aircraft carried: 2 x MH-65C Dolphin MCH, or 1 x [Sikorsky MH-60 Jayhawk] and 1 x sUAS

USCGC Midgett (WMSL-757) is the eighth Legend-class cutter of the United States Coast Guard and is stationed in Honolulu, Hawaii. The cutter was constructed by Huntington Ingalls Industries' Ingalls Shipbuilding Division in Pascagoula Mississippi and delivered to the Coast Guard in April 2019. She is named in honor of all members of the Midgett family who have served in the U.S. Coast Guard, United States Life-Saving Service, and/or other predecessor life-saving services. Seven members of the Midgett family have been awarded the Gold Lifesaving Medal including John Allen Midgett Jr. and Rasmus Midgett.

== Construction Milestones ==
Ingalls Shipbuilding conducted at-sea builder's trials for the cutter on January 22–25 and February 12–13, 2019. The cutter underwent acceptance testing conducted by the U.S. Navy Board of Inspection and Survey from March 25–28, 2019.

== Special Commissioning and Maiden Voyage ==
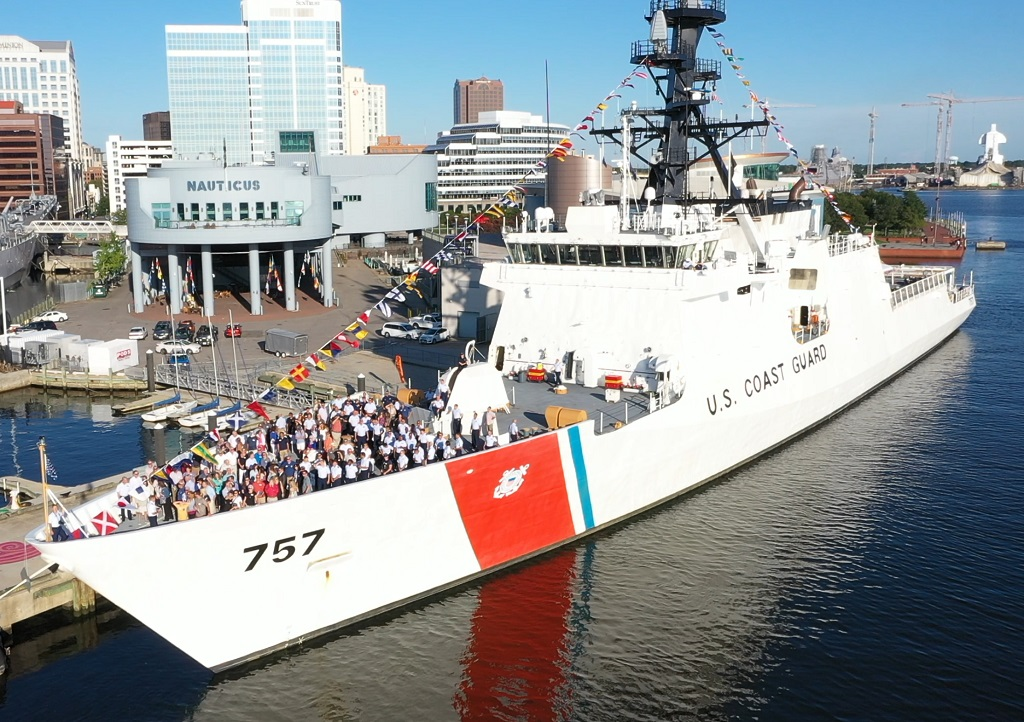
Members of the extended Midgett family onboard the cutter during a reception in Norfolk VA

Ingalls Shipbuilding delivered Midgett to the U.S. Coast Guard on April 30, 2019. Immediately upon receipt, the Coast Guard placed the cutter in 'Commission Special'. A small ceremony was held on the Midgett flight deck on May 1, 2019 which was attended by the crew of the cutter, USCG Project Resident Office Gulf Coast, and Ingalls Shipbuilding representatives. The cutter made her final sail-away from Ingalls Shipbuilding on June 11, 2019 and commenced her maiden voyage.

In early July 2019 while transiting off of North Carolina, Midgett conducted her first search and rescue operation when directed to assist a mariner on a disabled sailing vessel. On July 9, 2019, a 'Midgett Legacy Reception' was held onboard the cutter in Norfolk Virginia. Over 100 members of the extended Midgett family attended the event and toured the new ship.

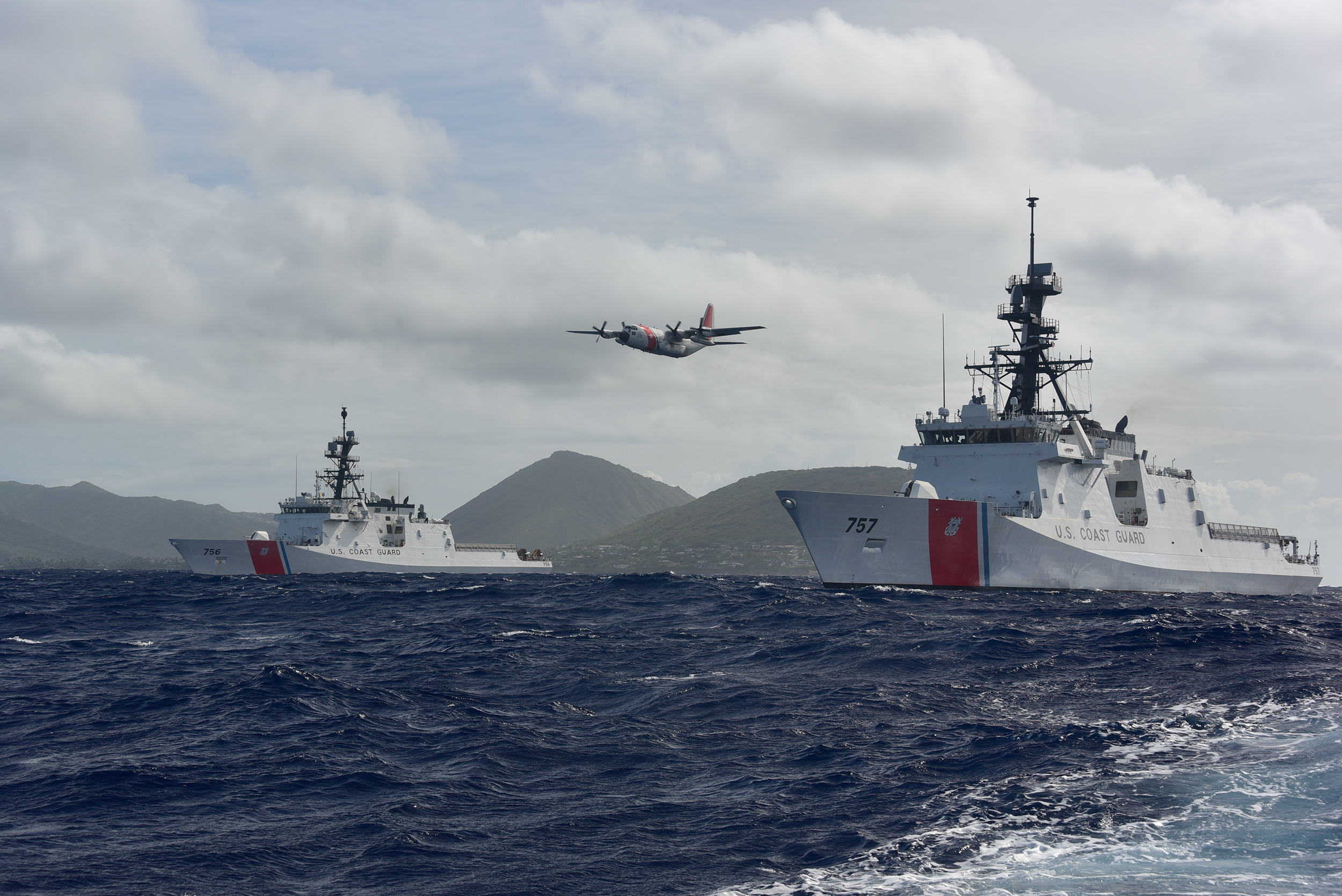
Midgett, an HC-130 search & rescue plane and USCGC Kimball (WMSL-756), sailing off Diamond Head, Hawaii, August 2019

On July 25, 2019, during the vessel's transit to Honolulu, Midgett seized more than 2,100 pounds of cocaine from a low-profile vessel in international waters in the Eastern Pacific. On July 31, 2019, Midgett seized more than 4,600 pounds of cocaine from a second low-profile vessel, their second cocaine bust in five days. Midgett arrived in her homeport of Honolulu for the first time on August 16, 2019.

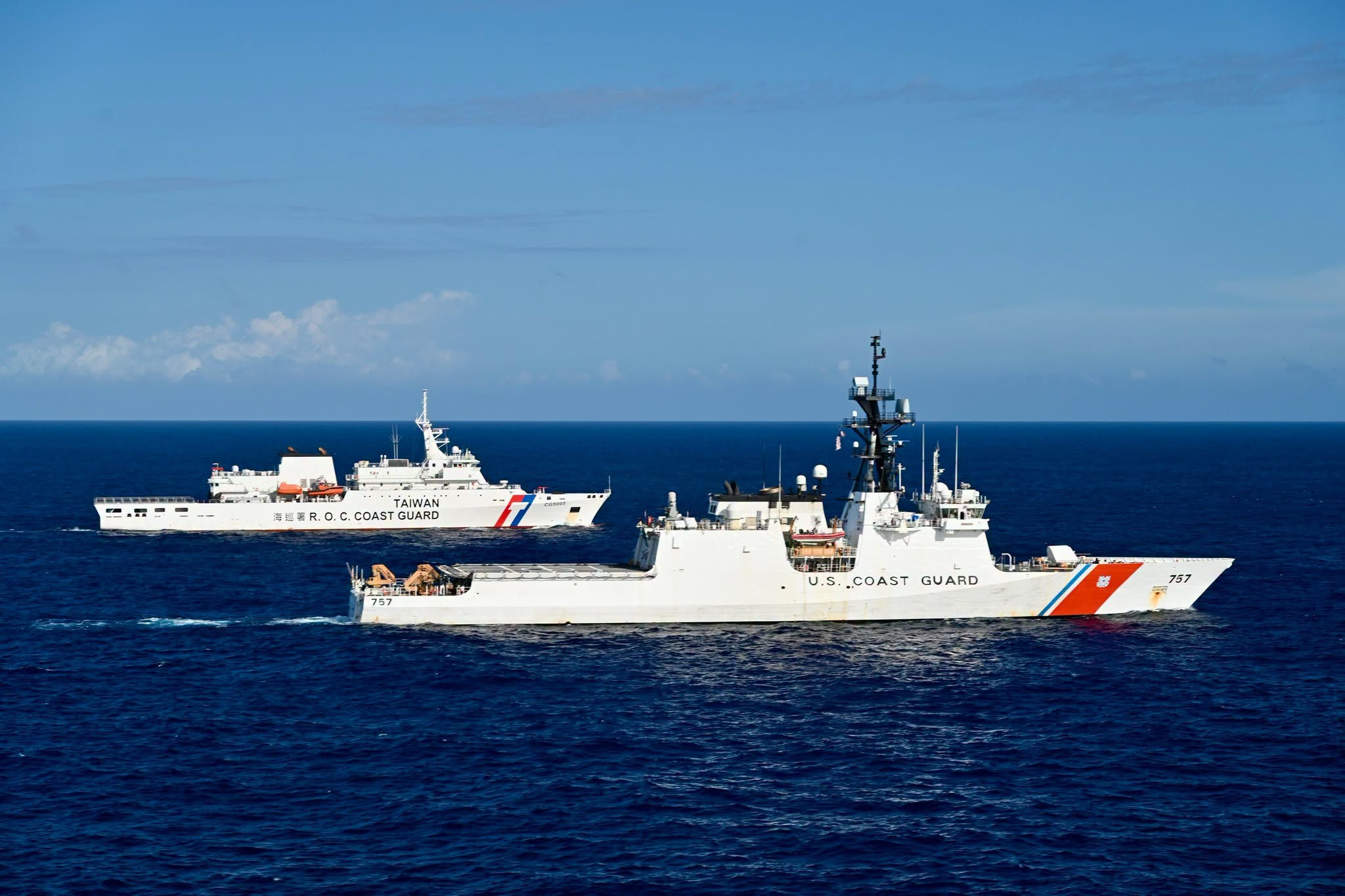
Midgett and Taipei sail in formation

In July 2026, the ROC Coast Guard and the American Institute in Taiwan released photos showing the Chiayi-class Taipei sailing alongside Midgett, demonstrating extensive cooperation between the two sides in the waters of the Taiwan Strait and the Western Pacific.

== Commissioning ==
Midgett was commissioned by the Coast Guard on August 24, 2019 in a dual ceremony with USCGC Kimball (WMSL-756).

== See also ==
- USCGC Midgett (WHEC-726)
- Legend-class cutter
- Integrated Deepwater System Program
